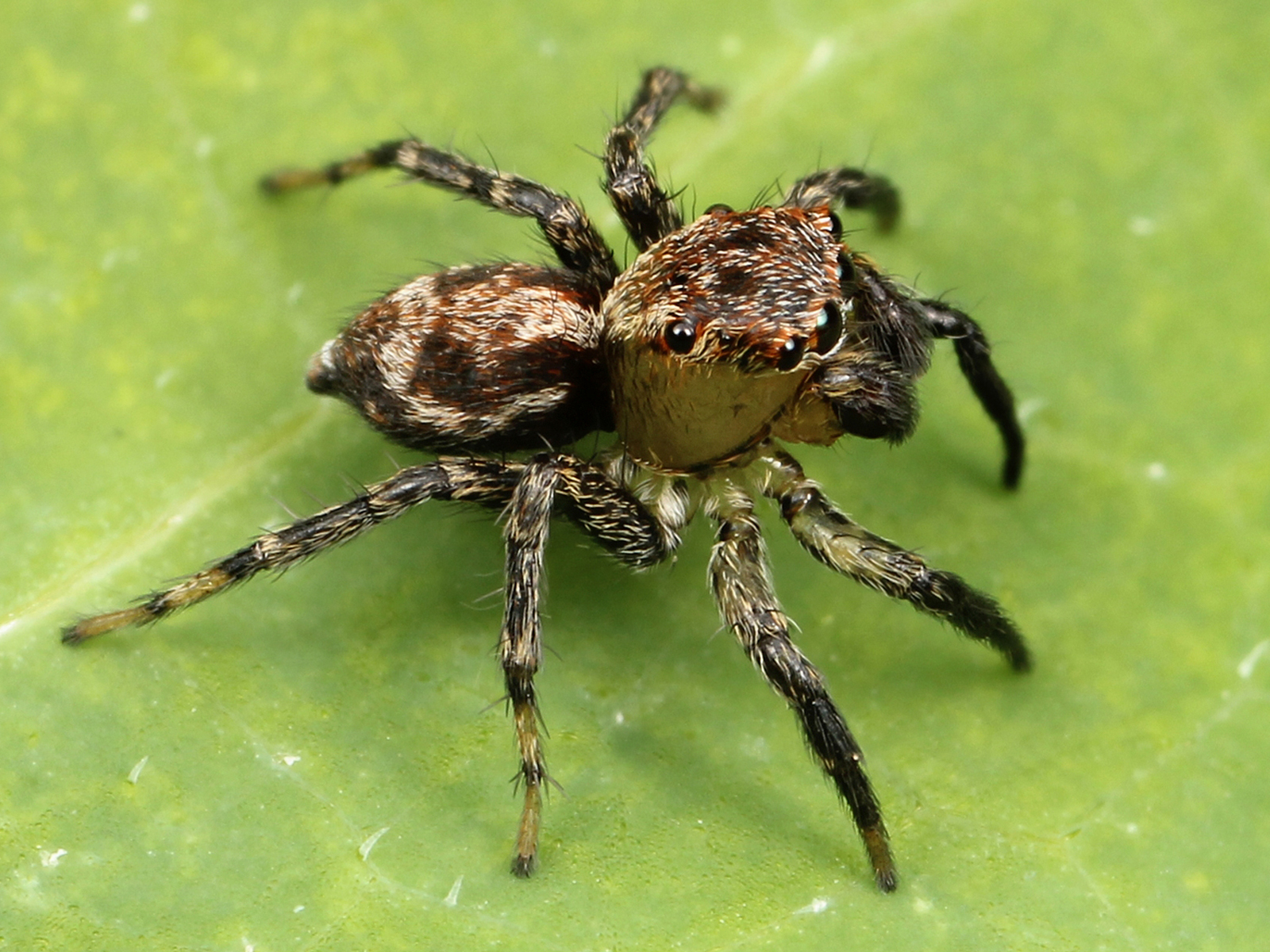
- Male Naphrys pulex

Scientific classification
- Kingdom: Animalia
- Phylum: Arthropoda
- Subphylum: Chelicerata
- Class: Arachnida
- Order: Araneae
- Infraorder: Araneomorphae
- Family: Salticidae
- Subfamily: Salticinae
- Tribe: Euophryini; Simon, 1901

Genera
- See text.

Synonyms
- Euophrydinae Prószyński, 1976; Euophryinae Wanless, 1988

= Euophryini =

Tribe of spiders

Euophryini is a tribe of jumping spiders. Most spiders in this tribe have a spiral embolus that faces ventrally.

== Taxonomy ==
=== Genera ===
Wayne Maddison in 2015 placed 116 extant genera in the tribe. Some genera have since been split up and other genera have been added.

- Agobardus Keyserling, 1885
- Allodecta Bryant, 1950
- Amphidraus Simon, 1900
- Anasaitis Bryant, 1950
- Antillattus Bryant, 1943
- Araneotanna Özdikmen & Kury, 2006
- Aruattus Logunov & Azarkina, 2008
- Asaphobelis Simon, 1902, included in Coryphasia by Zhang & Maddison (2015)
- Ascyltus Karsch, 1878
- Athamas O. Pickard-Cambridge, 1877
- Barraina Richardson, 2013
- Bathippus Thorell, 1892
- Baviola Simon, 1898
- Belliena Simon, 1902
- Bindax Thorell, 1892
- Bulolia Żabka, 1996
- Bythocrotus Simon, 1903
- Canama Simon, 1903
- Caribattus Bryant, 1950
- Chalcolecta Simon, 1884
- Chalcolemia Zhang & Maddison, 2012
- Chalcoscirtus Bertkau, 1880
- Chalcotropis Simon, 1902
- Chapoda Peckham & Peckham, 1896
- Charippus Thorell, 1895
- Chinophrys Zhang & Maddison, 2012
- Cobanus F. O. Pickard-Cambridge, 1900, included in Sidusa by Zhang & Maddison (2015)
- Coccorchestes Thorell, 1881
- Colyttus Thorell, 1891
- Commoris Simon, 1902
- Compsodecta Simon, 1903
- Corticattus Zhang & Maddison, 2012
- Coryphasia Simon, 1902
- Corythalia C. L. Koch, 1850
- Cytaea Keyserling, 1882
- Darwinneon Cutler, 1971
- Diolenius Thorell, 1870
- Ecuadattus Zhang & Maddison, 2012
- Efate Berland, 1938
- Emathis Simon, 1899
- Ergane L. Koch, 1881
- Euochin Prószyński, 2018
- Euophrys C. L. Koch, 1834
- Euryattus Thorell, 1881
- Featheroides Peng, Yin, Xie & Kim, 1994
- Foliabitus Zhang & Maddison, 2012
- Frewena Richardson, 2013
- Furculattus Balogh, 1980
- Gorgasella Chickering, 1946
- Hypoblemum Peckham & Peckham, 1886
- Ilargus Simon, 1901
- Jotus L. Koch, 1881
- Junxattus Prószyński & Deeleman-Reinhold, 2012, included in Laufeia by Zhang & Maddison (2015)
- Lagnus L. Koch, 1879
- Lakarobius Berry, Beatty & Prószyński, 1998
- Laufeia Simon, 1889
- Lauharulla Keyserling, 1883
- Lepidemathis Simon, 1903
- Leptathamas Balogh, 1980
- Lophostica Simon, 1902
- Maeota Simon, 1901
- Magyarus Żabka, 1985
- Maileus Peckham & Peckham, 1907
- Maratus Karsch, 1878
- Margaromma Keyserling, 1882
- Marma Simon, 1902
- Mexigonus Edwards, 2003
- Mopiopia Simon, 1902
- Naphrys Edwards, 2003
- Nebridia Simon, 1902, included in Amphidraus by Zhang & Maddison (2015)
- Neonella Gertsch, 1936
- Nicylla Thorell, 1890, included in Thiania by Zhang & Maddison (2015)
- Ohilimia Strand, 1911
- Omoedus Thorell, 1881
- Opisthoncana Strand, 1913
- Orcevia Thorell, 1890, included in Laufeia by Zhang & Maddison (2015)
- Parabathippus Zhang & Maddison, 2012
- Paraharmochirus Szombathy, 1915
- Parasaitis Bryant, 1950
- Parvattus Zhang & Maddison, 2012
- Pensacola Peckham & Peckham, 1885
- Pensacolops Bauab, 1983
- Petemathis Prószyński & Deeleman-Reinhold, 2012
- Phasmolia Zhang & Maddison, 2012
- Platypsecas Caporiacco, 1955
- Popcornella Zhang & Maddison, 2012
- Pristobaeus Simon, 1902
- Prostheclina Keyserling, 1882
- Pseudemathis Simon, 1902
- Pseudeuophrys Dahl, 1912
- Pseudocorythalia Caporiacco, 1938
- Pystira Simon, 1901, included in Omoedus in 2015
- Rarahu Berland, 1929
- Rhyphelia Simon, 1902
- Rumburak Wesołowska, Azarkina & Russell-Smith, 2014
- Saitidops Simon, 1901
- Saitis Simon, 1876
- Saitissus Roewer, 1938
- Saphrys Zhang & Maddison, 2015
- Saratus Otto & Hill, 2017
- Semnolius Simon, 1902
- Servaea Simon, 1888
- Sidusa Peckham & Peckham, 1895
- Sigytes Simon, 1902
- Sobasina Simon, 1898
- Soesilarishius Makhan, 2007
- Spilargis Simon, 1902
- Stoidis Simon, 1901
- Talavera Peckham & Peckham, 1909
- Tanzania Koçak & Kemal, 2008
- Tarodes Pocock, 1899
- Thiania C. L. Koch, 1846
- Thianitara Simon, 1903, included in Thiania by Zhang & Maddison, 2015
- Thorelliola Strand, 1942
- Thyenula Simon, 1902
- Truncattus Zhang & Maddison, 2012
- Tylogonus Simon, 1902
- Udvardya Prószyński, 1992
- Variratina Zhang & Maddison, 2012
- Viribestus Zhang & Maddison, 2012
- Viroqua Peckham & Peckham, 1901
- Wallaba Mello-Leitão, 1940, considered a synonym of Sidusa by Zhang & Maddison, 2015
- Xenocytaea Berry, Beatty & Prószyński, 1998
- Yacuitella Galiano, 1999
- Yimbulunga Wesołowska, Azarkina & Russell-Smith, 2014
- Zabkattus Zhang & Maddison, 2012
- Zenodorus Peckham & Peckham, 1886, included in Omoedus in 2015

One fossil genus has also been placed in the tribe:

- †Pensacolatus Wunderlich, 1988
