= Furculattus =

Scientific classification
- Kingdom: Animalia
- Phylum: Arthropoda
- Subphylum: Chelicerata
- Class: Arachnida
- Order: Araneae
- Infraorder: Araneomorphae
- Family: Salticidae
- Subfamily: Salticinae
- Genus: Furculattus; Balogh, 1980
- Species: F. maxillosus

Binomial name
- Furculattus maxillosus Balogh, 1980

Synonyms
- Diolenius minotaurus Wanless & Lubin, 1986

Genus of spiders

Furculattus is a genus of the spider family Salticidae (jumping spiders). Its only species is Furculattus maxillosus. It occurs on the Gazelle Peninsula of New Britain, New Guinea, where it was found in the canopy of rain forests.

== Description ==
Both sexes have unusual "horns" between their posterior eyes. Females reach a body length of almost 3 mm, while males are slightly larger, which is unusual for most spiders.

== Relationships ==
F. maxillosus seems to be related to the genera Chalcolecta, Diolenius, Lystrocteisa, Sobasina, Tarodes, Udvardya and several others.

== Name ==
The genus name is a contraction of furcula and the ending -attus, a common ending for salticid genera.
