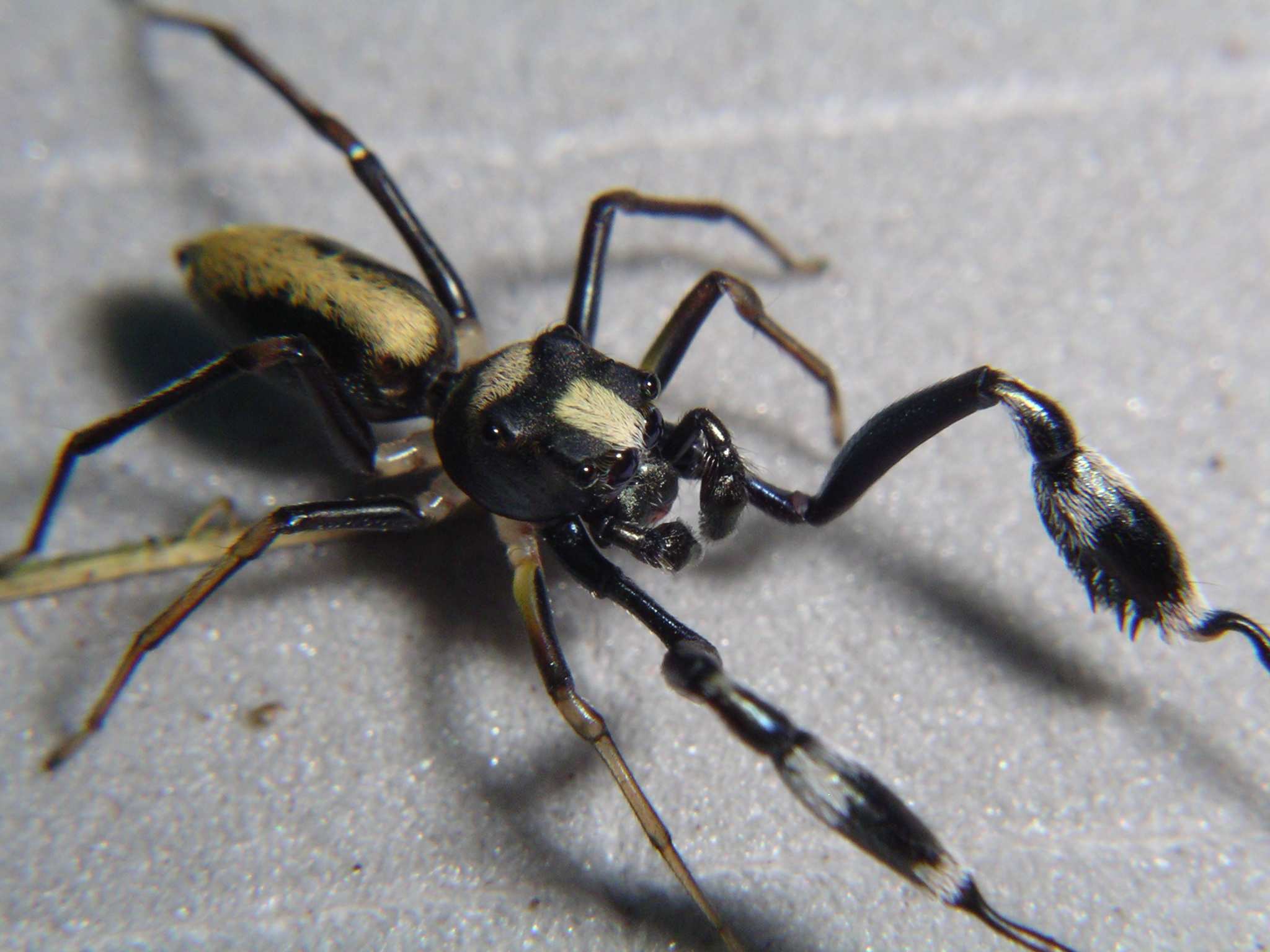
- Male Ohilimia sp. in Papua New Guinea

Scientific classification
- Kingdom: Animalia
- Phylum: Arthropoda
- Subphylum: Chelicerata
- Class: Arachnida
- Order: Araneae
- Infraorder: Araneomorphae
- Family: Salticidae
- Subfamily: Salticinae
- Genus: Ohilimia; Strand, 1911

Type species
- Diolenius albomaculatus Thorell, 1881

Species
- See text.

Diversity
- 3 species
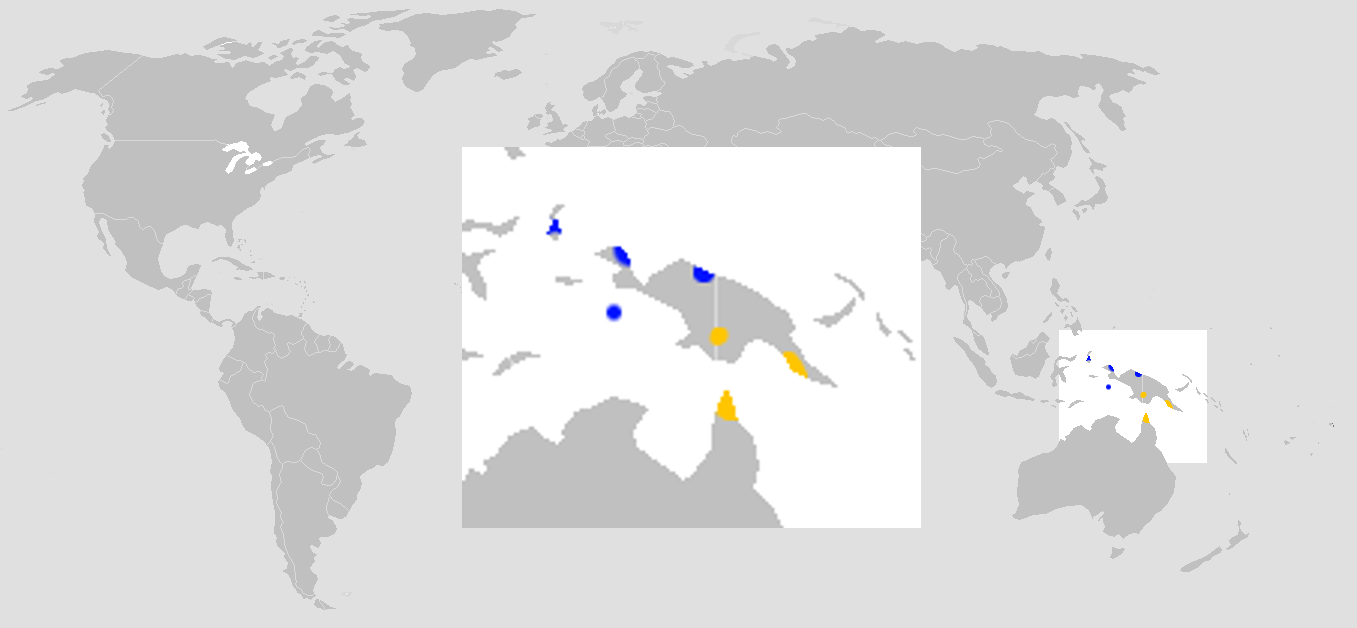
- blue: O. albomaculata, orange: O. scutellata

= Ohilimia =

Genus of spiders

Ohilimia is a spider genus of the jumping spider family, Salticidae.

== Description ==
Ohilimia albomaculata reaches a body length of 7 to 8 mm, while O. scutellata is 5 to 7 mm long. The cephalothorax of O. albomaculata is densely covered with short hairs, O. scutellata is only sparsely covered. The sexes are similar, with males having distinctive shiny scuta. The first, elongated pair of legs is held in a mantis-like manner. It seems that Ohilimia mimic flies in reverse: their first legs are held like the wings of a fly, and they move backwards.

== Relationships ==
Ohilimia is probably closely related to Diolenius and Chalcolecta, which also have elongated front legs.

== Distribution ==
Ohilimia only occurs in rainforests of the northeastern Cape York Peninsula of Australia, New Guinea and the Moluccas islands Ternate and Kai. The current distribution seems to be due to past land bridges.

== Species ==
As of April 2017, the World Spider Catalog accepted the following species:

- Ohilimia albomaculata (Thorell, 1881) – Moluccas; Bird's Head Peninsula, New Guinea
- Ohilimia laensis Gardzińska & Patoleta, 2010 – New Guinea
- Ohilimia scutellata (Kritscher, 1959) – Western and Central Provinces of Papua New Guinea; Cape York Peninsula, Queensland, Australia

== Bibliography ==
- Thorell, T. (1881): Studi sui Ragni Malesi e Papuani. III. Ragni dell'Austro Malesia e del Capo York, conservati nel Museo civico di storia naturale di Genova. Ann. Mus. civ. stor. nat. Genova 17: 1-727.
- Strand, E. (1911): Araneae von den Aru- und Kei-Inseln. Abh. senckenb. naturf. Ges. 34: 127-199.
- Kritscher, E. (1959): Die Arten der Gattung Discocnemius Thorell, 1881 (Aran., Salticidae). Doriana 3(101): 1-9.
- Davies, T.V. & Żabka, M. (1989): Illustrated keys to the genera of jumping spiders (Araneae: Salticidae) in Australia. Memoirs of the Queensland Museum 27(2): 189-266.
- Gardzińska, J. (2006): A revision of the spider genus Ohilimia Strand, 1911 (Araneae: Salticidae). Annls zool. Warsz. 56: 375-385. PDF (with key to Ohilimia and related genera)
