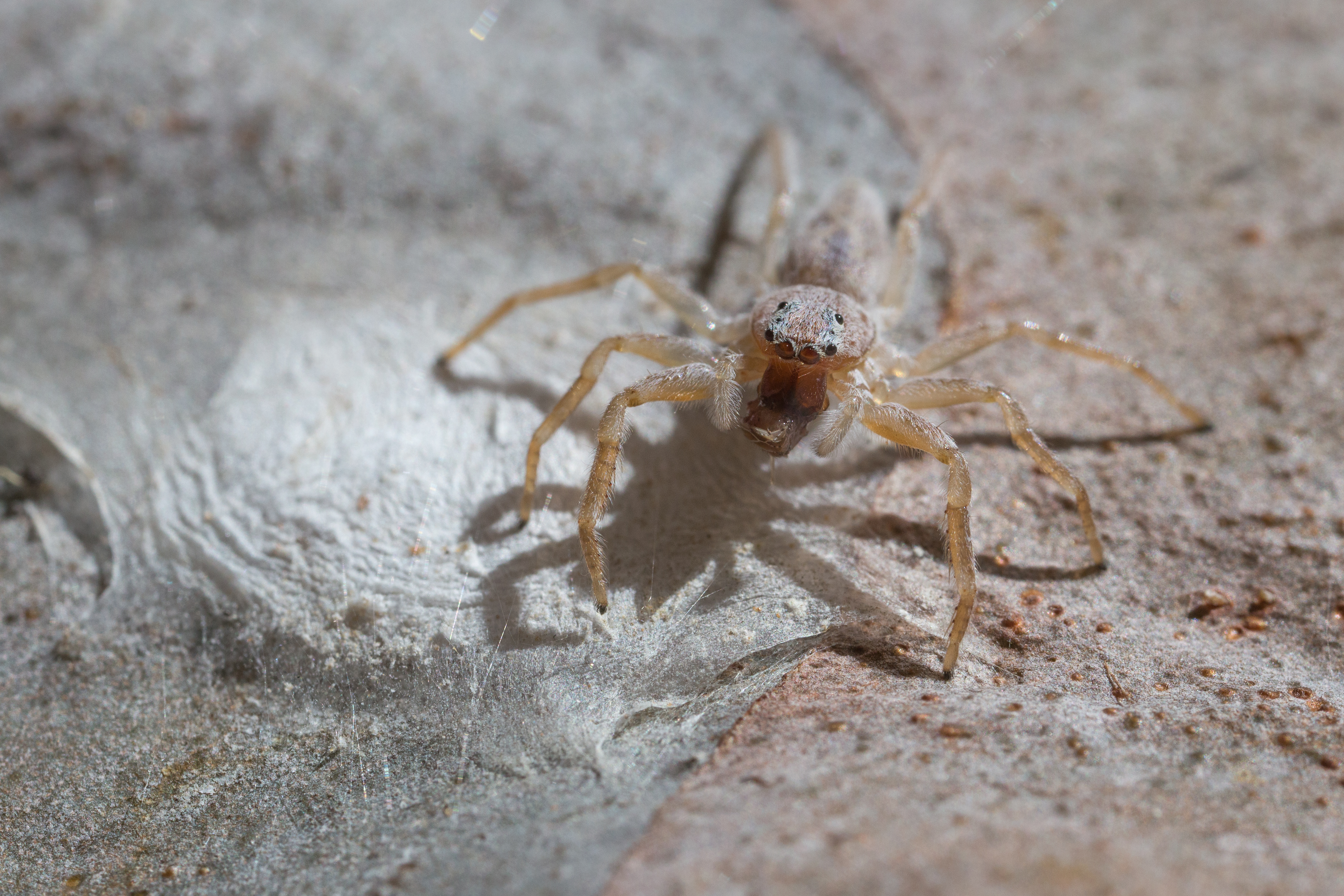
- Arasia mollicoma

Scientific classification
- Kingdom: Animalia
- Phylum: Arthropoda
- Subphylum: Chelicerata
- Class: Arachnida
- Order: Araneae
- Infraorder: Araneomorphae
- Family: Salticidae
- Subfamily: Salticinae
- Genus: Arasia; Simon, 1901

Type species
- A. mollicoma (L. Koch, 1880)

Species
- A. eucalypti Gardzinska, 1996 – New Guinea; A. mollicoma (L. Koch, 1880) – Australia (Queensland); A. mullion Zabka, 2002 – Australia (New South Wales)

= Arasia =

Genus of spiders

Arasia is a genus of South Pacific jumping spiders that was first described by Eugène Louis Simon in 1901. As of June 2019 it contains only three species, found only in Australia and Papua New Guinea: A. eucalypti, A. mollicoma, and A. mullion.
