= Logunattus =

Scientific classification
- Kingdom: Animalia
- Phylum: Arthropoda
- Subphylum: Chelicerata
- Class: Arachnida
- Order: Araneae
- Infraorder: Araneomorphae
- Family: Salticidae
- Tribe: Euophryini
- Genus: Logunattus; Wang & Li, 2023

Type species
- L. libaii Wang & Song, 2023

Species
- 2, see text

Genus of spiders

Logunattus is a genus of spiders in the family Salticidae.

== Distribution ==
The genus Logunattus is endemic to Hainan, China.

== Etymology ==
The genus name honors arachnologist Dmitri Viktorovich Logunov, combined with the common jumping spider genus ending "-attus".

L. dufui is named after Chinese poet Du Fu (杜甫; Dù Fǔ, 712–770). L. libaii is named after poet Li Bai (李白; Lǐ Báic. 701–762).

== Species ==
As of January 2026, this genus includes two species:

- Logunattus dufui Wang & Li, 2023 – China (Hainan)
- Logunattus libaii Wang & Li, 2023 – China (Hainan)
