= Nakanai =

Nakanai may be,

- Nakanai Mountains
- Nakanai language
- Chalcolemia nakanai, sp. spider

== See also ==
- Nakanai to Kimeta Hi, Japanese TV drama
