= Platypsecas =

Scientific classification
- Kingdom: Animalia
- Phylum: Arthropoda
- Subphylum: Chelicerata
- Class: Arachnida
- Order: Araneae
- Infraorder: Araneomorphae
- Family: Salticidae
- Genus: Platypsecas; Caporiacco, 1955
- Species: P. razzabonii

Binomial name
- Platypsecas razzabonii Caporiacco, 1955

Genus of spiders

Platypsecas is a monotypic genus of Venezuelan jumping spiders containing the single species, Platypsecas razzabonii. It was first described by Lodovico di Caporiacco in 1955, and is only found in Venezuela. The type locality is El Junquito in the Capital District. Gustavo R. S. Ruiz and Antonio D. Brescovit though the genus was "possibly in Euophryinae"; Wayne P. Maddison followed their "tentative suggestion" and classified the genus in the tribe Euophryini within the clade Saltafresia and subfamily Salticinae.
