= Wallaba =

Scientific classification
- Kingdom: Animalia
- Phylum: Arthropoda
- Subphylum: Chelicerata
- Class: Arachnida
- Order: Araneae
- Infraorder: Araneomorphae
- Family: Salticidae
- Subfamily: Salticinae
- Genus: Wallaba; Mello-Leitão, 1940
- Species: W. metallica

Binomial name
- Wallaba metallica (Mello-Leitão, 1940)

Genus of spiders

Wallaba is a monotypic genus of Guyanese jumping spiders containing the single species, Wallaba metallica. It was first described by Cândido Firmino de Mello-Leitão in 1940, and is found in Guyana. It was synonymized with Sidusa in 2015, but was revalidated by Jerzy Prószyński in 2017.

Prószyński placed Wallaba in his informal group "euophryines". When synonymized with Sidusa, it was placed in the large tribe Euophryini, part of the Salticoida clade of the subfamily Salticinae in Maddison's 2015 classification of the family Salticidae.
