= Leptathamas =

Scientific classification
- Kingdom: Animalia
- Phylum: Arthropoda
- Subphylum: Chelicerata
- Class: Arachnida
- Order: Araneae
- Infraorder: Araneomorphae
- Family: Salticidae
- Genus: Leptathamas
- Species: L. paradoxus

Binomial name
- Leptathamas paradoxus Balogh, 1980

Genus of spiders

Leptathamas is a spider genus of the jumping spider family, Salticidae, with one described species, which occurs only in New Guinea.

The genus seems to be closely related to Athamas and Bulolia, occupying a "midway" position between them.

== Name ==
The genus name is a combination of Ancient Greek lepto "slender, fine" and the name of the related genus Athamas.
