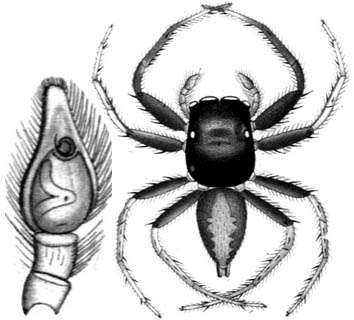

Scientific classification
- Kingdom: Animalia
- Phylum: Arthropoda
- Subphylum: Chelicerata
- Class: Arachnida
- Order: Araneae
- Infraorder: Araneomorphae
- Family: Salticidae
- Subfamily: Salticinae
- Genus: Margaromma; Keyserling, 1882

Type species
- Margaromma funestum Keyserling, 1882

Species
- See text.

Diversity
- 8 species

= Margaromma =

Genus of spiders

Margaromma is a spider genus of the jumping spider family, Salticidae. The eight described species occur mostly in Australia and New Zealand, with several other species on Pacific islands. One species (M. nitidum) is found in Cameroon.

M. spatiosum from Sarawak has not been studied since its first description in 1907. It reaches a body length of about 5 mm. M. spatiosum has a high cephalothorax, with a flattish area just behind the rear eyes. The eye region is black, the rear part dark red, with white bands around the sides. The abdomen is almost circular and truncated at the front. It is brown, much lighter than the cephalothorax, with some red and white hairs. The legs are brown, with darker front legs. Murphy & Murphy (2000) cast some doubt if the species really belongs to Margaromma.

== Name ==
The genus name is probably derived from Ancient Greek words for pearl and eye. There has been some confusion as to the grammatical gender of this genus, with some authors considering it neuter, and others female, resulting in different endings of species names.

== Species ==
As of February 2017, the World Spider Catalog accepted the following species:

- Margaromma doreyanum (Walckenaer, 1837) – New Guinea
- Margaromma funestum Keyserling, 1882 – Queensland, New South Wales
- Margaromma imperiosum Szombathy, 1915 – New Guinea
- Margaromma namukana Roewer, 1944 – Fiji
- Margaromma nitidum Thorell, 1899 – Cameroon
- Margaromma obscurum (Keyserling, 1882) – Queensland
- Margaromma soligena Simon, 1901 – New Guinea
- Margaromma spatiosum Peckham & Peckham, 1907 – Borneo

M. albertisi and M. marginatum were transferred to genus Zenodorus in 1991. M. insultans, M. semirasum, M. sexuale and M. torquatum are now placed in Omoedus.
