= Pensacolops =

Scientific classification
- Kingdom: Animalia
- Phylum: Arthropoda
- Subphylum: Chelicerata
- Class: Arachnida
- Order: Araneae
- Infraorder: Araneomorphae
- Family: Salticidae
- Genus: Pensacolops; Bauab, 1983
- Species: P. rubrovittata

Binomial name
- Pensacolops rubrovittata Bauab, 1983

Genus of spiders

Pensacolops is a monotypic genus of Brazilian jumping spiders containing the single species, Pensacolops rubrovittata. It was first described by M. J. Bauab V. in 1983, and is only found in Brazil. The name is a combination of the salticid genus Pensacola and the Ancient Greek "-ops" (ὄψ), meaning "to look like". The species name is a combination of the Latin rubrus, meaning "red", and vittatus, which means "striped".
