= Bythocrotus cephalotes =

Scientific classification
- Kingdom: Animalia
- Phylum: Arthropoda
- Subphylum: Chelicerata
- Class: Arachnida
- Order: Araneae
- Infraorder: Araneomorphae
- Family: Salticidae
- Genus: Bythocrotus
- Species: B. cephalotes

Binomial name
- Bythocrotus cephalotes (Simon, 1888)

Species of spider

Bythocrotus cephalotes is a species of spider in the family Salticidae, found in Hispaniola.
