= Caribattus =

Scientific classification
- Kingdom: Animalia
- Phylum: Arthropoda
- Subphylum: Chelicerata
- Class: Arachnida
- Order: Araneae
- Infraorder: Araneomorphae
- Family: Salticidae
- Genus: Caribattus; Bryant, 1950
- Species: C. inutilis

Binomial name
- Caribattus inutilis (Peckham & Peckham, 1901)

Genus of spiders

Caribattus is a monotypic genus of jumping spiders containing the single species, Caribattus inutilis. It was first described by E. B. Bryant in 1950, and is only found on the Greater Antilles. The name is derived from "Caribbean", and -attus, a common suffix for salticid genera. The species name inutilis is Latin for "useless".
