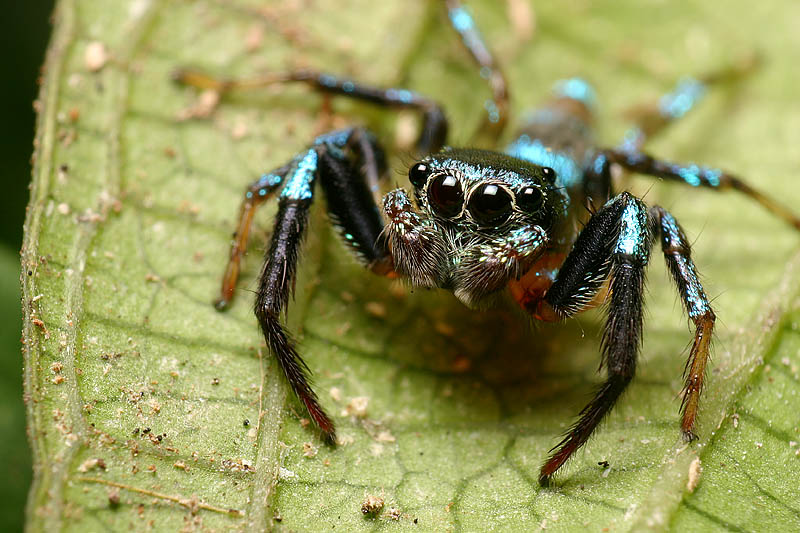
- Nicylla sundevalli

Scientific classification
- Kingdom: Animalia
- Phylum: Arthropoda
- Subphylum: Chelicerata
- Class: Arachnida
- Order: Araneae
- Infraorder: Araneomorphae
- Family: Salticidae
- Subfamily: Salticinae
- Genus: Nicylla; Thorell, 1890
- Species: N. sundevalli

Binomial name
- Nicylla sundevalli Thorell, 1890

= Nicylla =

Genus of spiders

Nicylla is a monotypic genus of Sumatran jumping spiders containing the single species, Nicylla sundevalli. It was first described by Tamerlan Thorell in 1890, and is only found on Sumatra. Briefly considered a synonym of Thiania, it was elevated back to genus status in 2017.

Thiania, circumscribed to include Nicylla, is placed in the tribe Euophryini, part of the Salticoida clade of the subfamily Salticinae.
