= Saitidops =

Scientific classification
- Kingdom: Animalia
- Phylum: Arthropoda
- Subphylum: Chelicerata
- Class: Arachnida
- Order: Araneae
- Infraorder: Araneomorphae
- Family: Salticidae
- Subfamily: Salticinae
- Genus: Saitidops; Simon, 1901

Type species
- S. clathratus Simon, 1901

Species
- S. albopatellus Bryant, 1950 – Jamaica; S. clathratus Simon, 1901 – Venezuela

Genus of spiders

Saitidops is a genus of jumping spiders that was first described by Eugène Louis Simon in 1901. As of August 2019 it contains only two species, found only in Venezuela and on the Greater Antilles: S. albopatellus and S. clathratus.
