= Parabathippus =

Scientific classification
- Kingdom: Animalia
- Phylum: Arthropoda
- Subphylum: Chelicerata
- Class: Arachnida
- Order: Araneae
- Infraorder: Araneomorphae
- Family: Salticidae
- Subfamily: Salticinae
- Genus: Parabathippus; Zhang & Maddison, 2012

Type species
- P. shelfordi (Peckham & Peckham, 1907)

Species
- 10, see text

Genus of spiders

Parabathippus is a genus of Southeast Asian jumping spiders that was first described by J. X. Zhang & Wayne Paul Maddison in 2012.

== Species ==
As of August 2019 it contains ten species, found in Indonesia, Singapore, Malaysia, and Myanmar:

- Parabathippus birmanicus (Thorell, 1895) – Myanmar
- Parabathippus cuspidatus Zhang & Maddison, 2012 – Malaysia
- Parabathippus digitalis (Zhang, Song & Li, 2003) – Singapore
- Parabathippus kiabau Zhang & Maddison, 2012 – Borneo
- Parabathippus macilentus (Thorell, 1890) – Indonesia (Sumatra)
- Parabathippus magnus Zhang & Maddison, 2012 – Malaysia
- Parabathippus petrae (Prószyński & Deeleman-Reinhold, 2012) – Indonesia (Sumatra)
- Parabathippus rectus (Zhang, Song & Li, 2003) – Singapore
- Parabathippus sedatus (Peckham & Peckham, 1907) – Borneo
- Parabathippus shelfordi (Peckham & Peckham, 1907) (type) – Borneo
