= Viribestus =

Scientific classification
- Kingdom: Animalia
- Phylum: Arthropoda
- Subphylum: Chelicerata
- Class: Arachnida
- Order: Araneae
- Infraorder: Araneomorphae
- Family: Salticidae
- Genus: Viribestus; Zhang & Maddison, 2012
- Species: V. suyanensis

Binomial name
- Viribestus suyanensis Zhang & Maddison, 2012

Genus of spiders

Viribestus is a monotypic genus of Papuan jumping spiders containing the single species, Viribestus suyanensis. It was first described by J. X. Zhang & Wayne Paul Maddison in 2012, and is found in Papua New Guinea.
