= Stoidis =

Scientific classification
- Kingdom: Animalia
- Phylum: Arthropoda
- Subphylum: Chelicerata
- Class: Arachnida
- Order: Araneae
- Infraorder: Araneomorphae
- Family: Salticidae
- Subfamily: Salticinae
- Genus: Stoidis; Simon, 1901

Type species
- S. pygmaea (Peckham & Peckham, 1894)

Species
- Stoidis pygmaea (Peckham & Peckham, 1894) – St. Vincent; Stoidis squamulosa Caporiacco, 1955 – Venezuela

Genus of spiders

Stoidis is a genus of jumping spiders that was first described by Eugène Louis Simon in 1901. As of August 2019 it contains only two species, found only in Venezuela and on the Windward Islands: S. pygmaea and S. squamulosa.
