= Viroqua ultima =

Scientific classification
- Kingdom: Animalia
- Phylum: Arthropoda
- Subphylum: Chelicerata
- Class: Arachnida
- Order: Araneae
- Infraorder: Araneomorphae
- Family: Salticidae
- Subfamily: Salticinae
- Genus: Viroqua; Peckham & Peckham, 1901
- Species: V. ultima

Binomial name
- Viroqua ultima (L. Koch, 1881)

Synonyms
- Jotus ultimus L. Koch, 1881

Species of spider

Viroqua ultima is a species of spider in the family Salticidae (jumping spiders). It is the only described species of the genus Viroqua. It is only found in Australia. The species was first described by Ludwig Carl Christian Koch in 1881, in the genus Jotus, and was transferred to the new genus Viroqua by George and Elizabeth Peckham in 1901.
