= Pseudemathis =

Scientific classification
- Kingdom: Animalia
- Phylum: Arthropoda
- Subphylum: Chelicerata
- Class: Arachnida
- Order: Araneae
- Infraorder: Araneomorphae
- Family: Salticidae
- Genus: Pseudemathis; Simon, 1902
- Species: P. trifida

Binomial name
- Pseudemathis trifida Simon, 1902

Genus of spiders

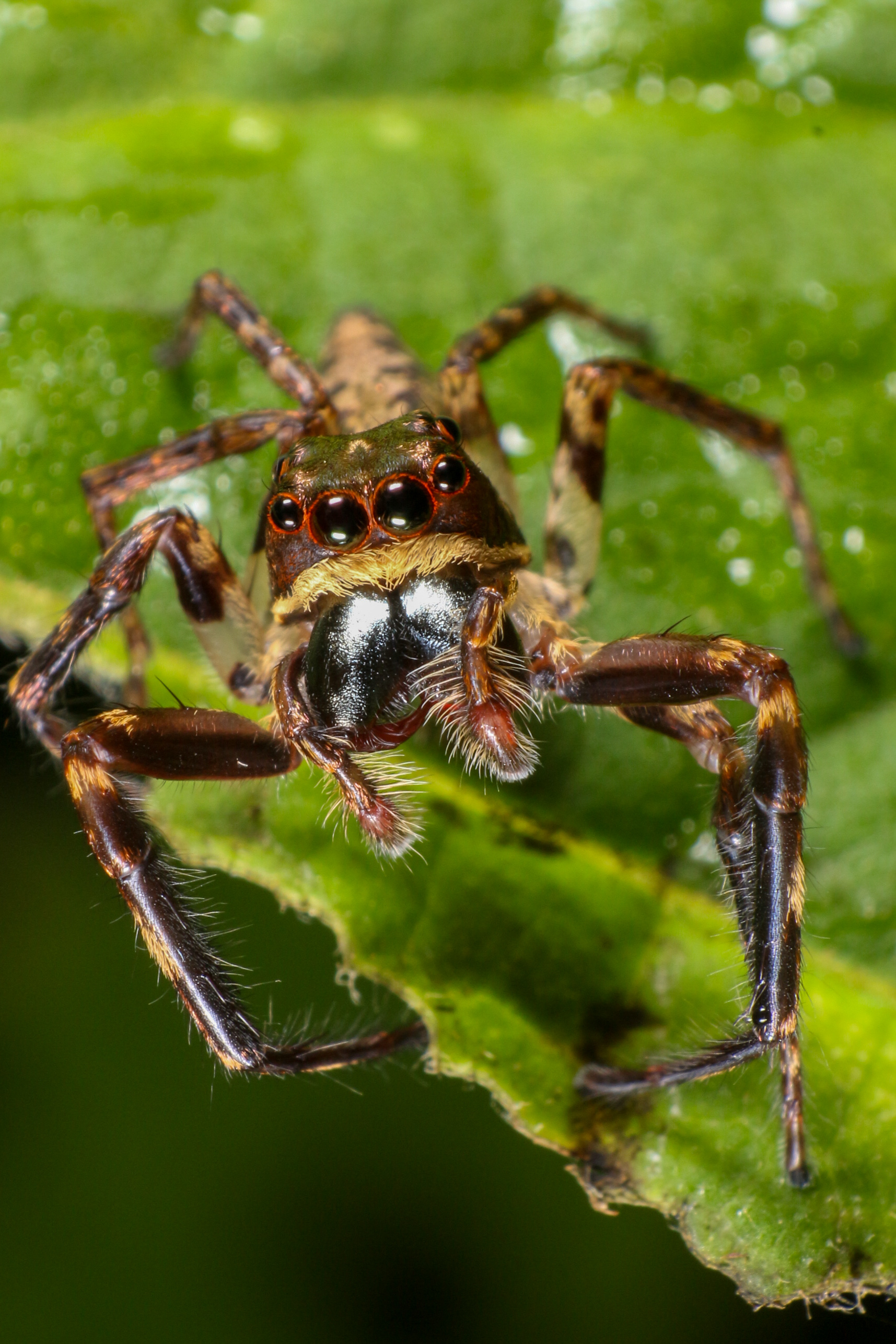
Pseudemathis trifida (male)

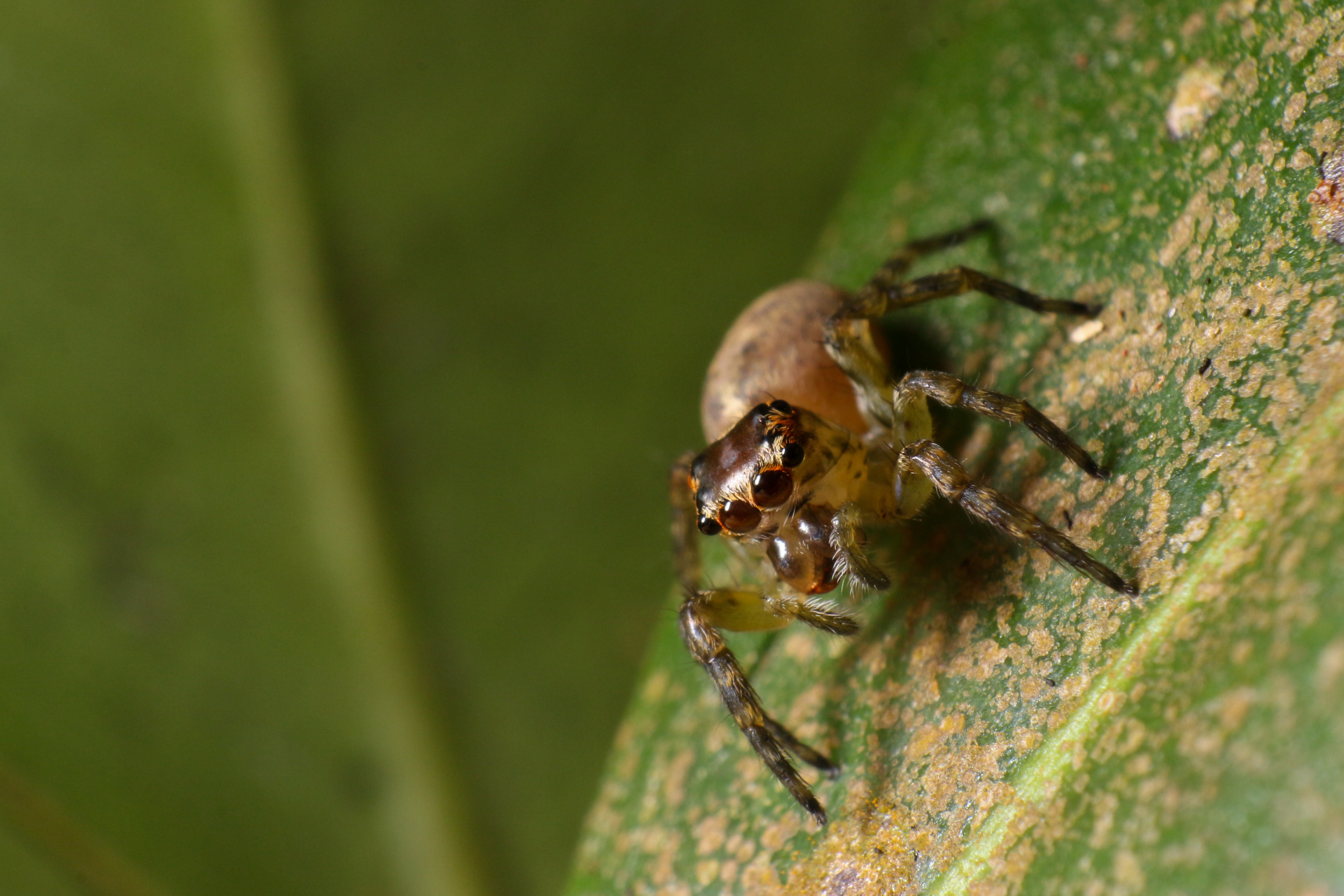
Pseudemathis trifida (female)

Pseudemathis is a monotypic genus of African jumping spiders containing the single species, Pseudemathis trifida. It was first described by Eugène Louis Simon in 1902, and is found only in Africa. The name is a combination of the Ancient Greek "pseudo-" (ψευδής), meaning "false", and the salticid genus name Emathis.
