= Gorgasella =

Scientific classification
- Kingdom: Animalia
- Phylum: Arthropoda
- Subphylum: Chelicerata
- Class: Arachnida
- Order: Araneae
- Infraorder: Araneomorphae
- Family: Salticidae
- Genus: Gorgasella; Chickering, 1946
- Species: G. eximia

Binomial name
- Gorgasella eximia Chickering, 1946

Genus of spiders

Gorgasella is a monotypic genus of Panamanian jumping spiders containing the single species, Gorgasella eximia. It was first described by Arthur Merton Chickering in 1946, and is only found in Panama. The genus is named after William Crawford Gorgas, who eliminated yellow fever in Panama.
