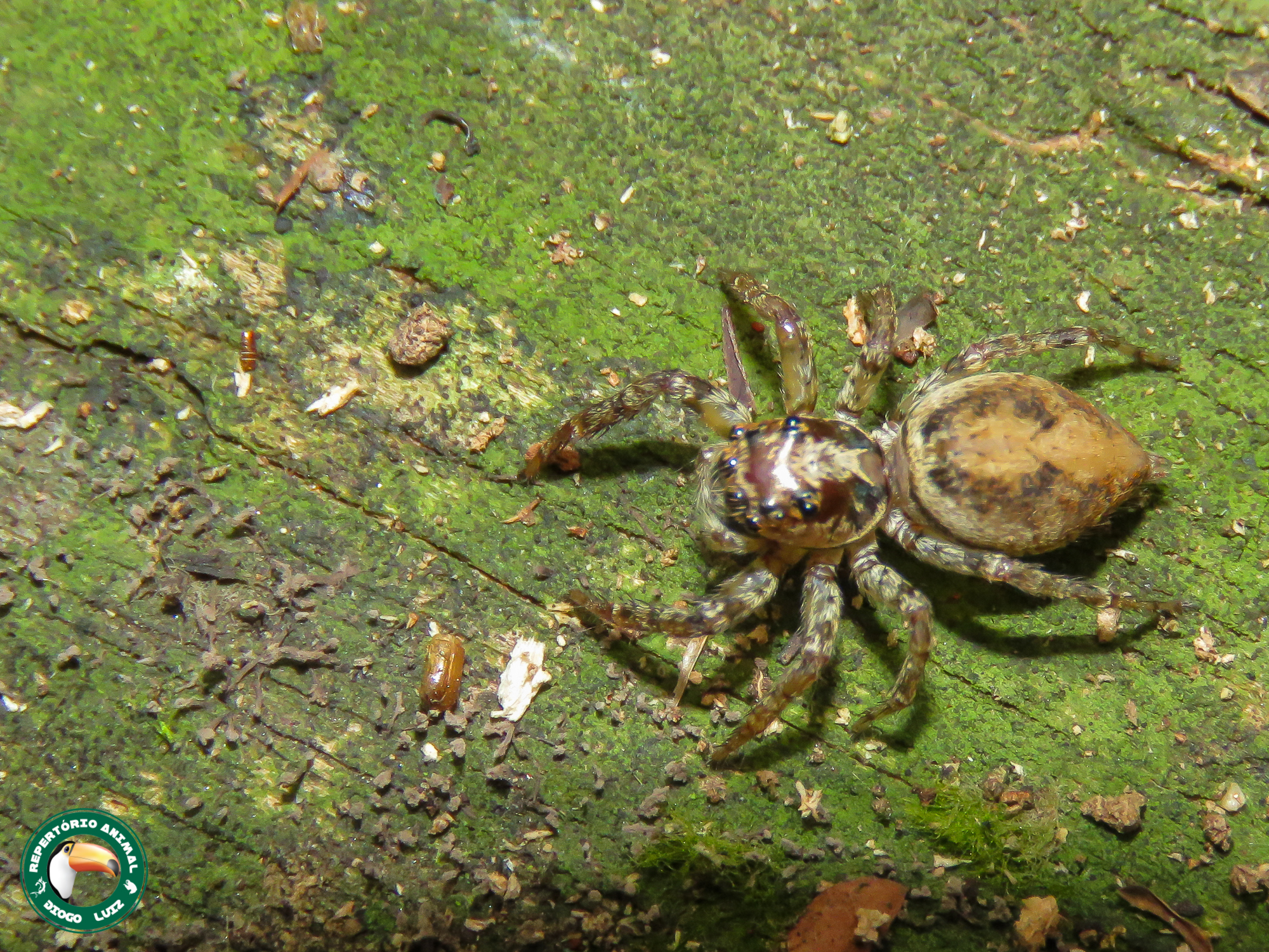

Scientific classification
- Kingdom: Animalia
- Phylum: Arthropoda
- Subphylum: Chelicerata
- Class: Arachnida
- Order: Araneae
- Infraorder: Araneomorphae
- Family: Salticidae
- Subfamily: Salticinae
- Genus: Coryphasia; Simon, 1902

Type species
- C. albibarbis Simon, 1902

Species
- 16, see text

Synonyms
- Siloca Simon, 1902

= Coryphasia =

Genus of spiders

Coryphasia is a genus of jumping spiders that was first described by Eugène Louis Simon in 1902.

== Species ==
As of June 2019 it contains sixteen species, found in Brazil, Argentina, Jamaica, on the Greater Antilles, and in French Guiana:

- Coryphasia albibarbis Simon, 1902 (type) – Brazil
- Coryphasia artemioi Bauab, 1986 – Brazil
- Coryphasia bulbosa (Tullgren, 1905) – Argentina
- Coryphasia campestrata (Simon, 1902) – Brazil
- Coryphasia cardoso Santos & Romero, 2007 – Brazil
- Coryphasia castaneipedis Mello-Leitão, 1947 – Brazil
- Coryphasia fasciiventris (Simon, 1902) – Brazil
- Coryphasia furcata Simon, 1902 – Brazil
- Coryphasia melloleitaoi Soares & Camargo, 1948 – Brazil
- Coryphasia monae (Petrunkevitch, 1930) – Puerto Rico
- Coryphasia monteverde Santos & Romero, 2007 – Brazil
- Coryphasia nigriventris Mello-Leitão, 1947 – Brazil
- Coryphasia nuptialis Bauab, 1986 – Brazil
- Coryphasia sanguiniceps (Simon, 1902) – Brazil
- Coryphasia septentrionalis (Caporiacco, 1954) – French Guiana
- Coryphasia viaria (Peckham & Peckham, 1901) – Jamaica
