= Lystrocteisa =

Scientific classification
- Kingdom: Animalia
- Phylum: Arthropoda
- Subphylum: Chelicerata
- Class: Arachnida
- Order: Araneae
- Infraorder: Araneomorphae
- Family: Salticidae
- Genus: Lystrocteisa
- Species: L. myrmex

Binomial name
- Lystrocteisa myrmex Simon, 1884

Genus of spiders

Lystrocteisa is a genus of jumping spiders endemic to New Caledonia. It contains only one species, Lystrocteisa myrmex.

== Name ==
The species name myrmex is Greek for ant.
