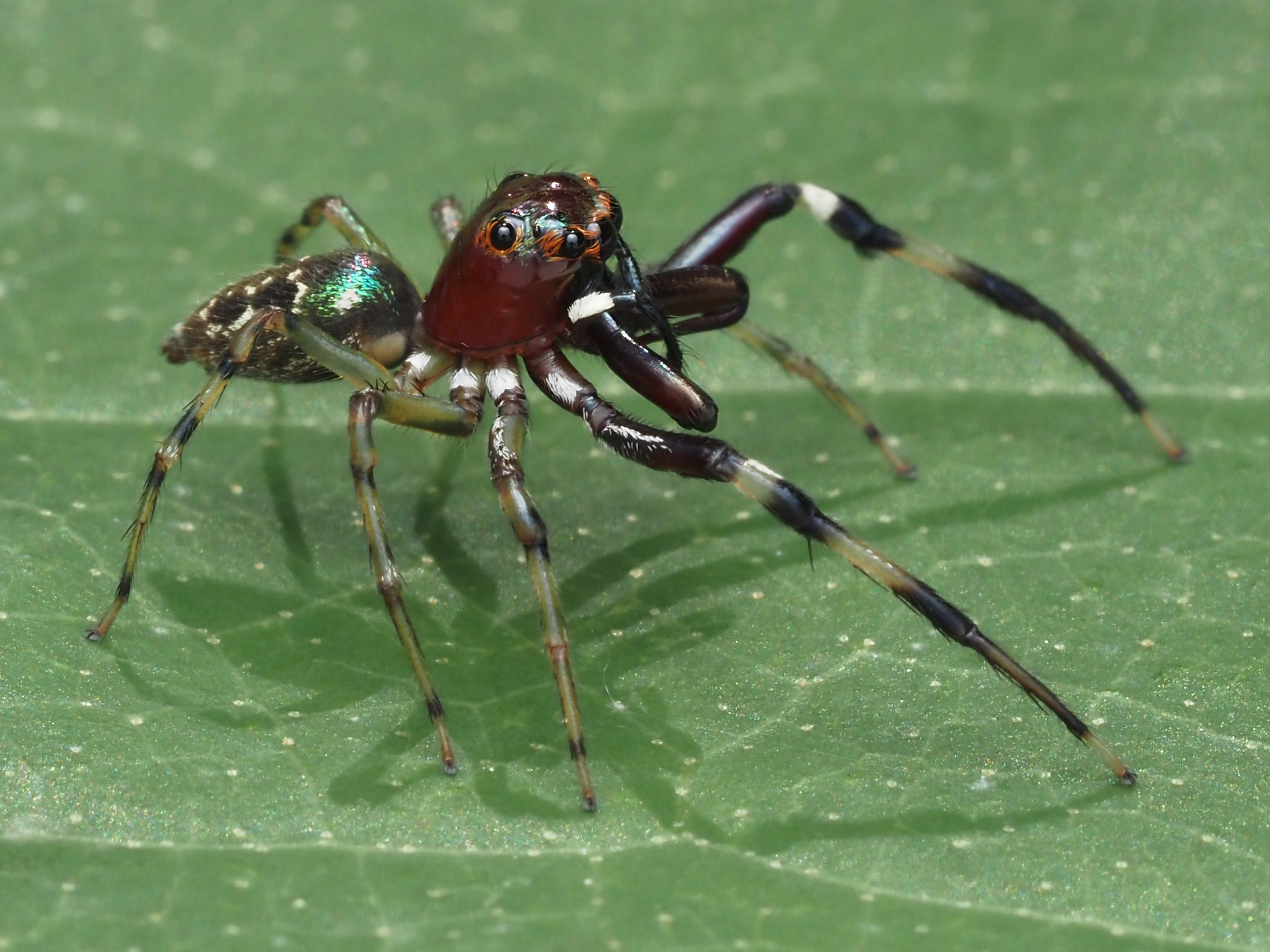
- Male Cobanus extensus

Scientific classification
- Kingdom: Animalia
- Phylum: Arthropoda
- Subphylum: Chelicerata
- Class: Arachnida
- Order: Araneae
- Infraorder: Araneomorphae
- Family: Salticidae
- Subfamily: Salticinae
- Genus: Cobanus; F. O. Pickard-Cambridge, 1900

Type species
- Cobanus mandibularis G. W. Peckham & E. G. Peckham, 1896

= Cobanus =

Genus of spiders

Cobanus is a genus of jumping spiders that was first described by Frederick Octavius Pickard-Cambridge in 1900.

== Species ==
As of February 2022 it contains eight species found in Central and South America:

- Cobanus bifurcatus Chickering, 1946 – Panama
- Cobanus cambridgei Chickering, 1946 – Panama
- Cobanus chocquibtown Cala-Riquelme, Bustamante & Salgado, 2022 – Colombia
- Cobanus electus Chickering, 1946 – Panama
- Cobanus extensus (G. W. Peckham & E. G. Peckham, 1896) – Costa Rica, Panama
- Cobanus mandibularis (G. W. Peckham & E. G. Peckham, 1896) – Panama, Colombia
- Cobanus muelona Cala-Riquelme, Bustamante & Salgado, 2022 – Colombia
- Cobanus unicolor F. O. Pickard-Cambridge, 1900 – Costa Rica, Panama
