= Commoris =

Scientific classification
- Kingdom: Animalia
- Phylum: Arthropoda
- Subphylum: Chelicerata
- Class: Arachnida
- Order: Araneae
- Infraorder: Araneomorphae
- Family: Salticidae
- Subfamily: Salticinae
- Genus: Commoris; Simon, 1902

Type species
- C. enoplognatha Simon, 1902

Species
- C. enoplognatha Simon, 1902 – Guadeloupe, Dominica; C. minor Simon, 1903 – Guadeloupe

Genus of spiders

Commoris is a genus of Caribbean jumping spiders that was first described by Eugène Louis Simon in 1902. As of June 2019 it contains only two species, found only in Dominica and on Guadeloupe: C. enoplognatha and C. minor.
