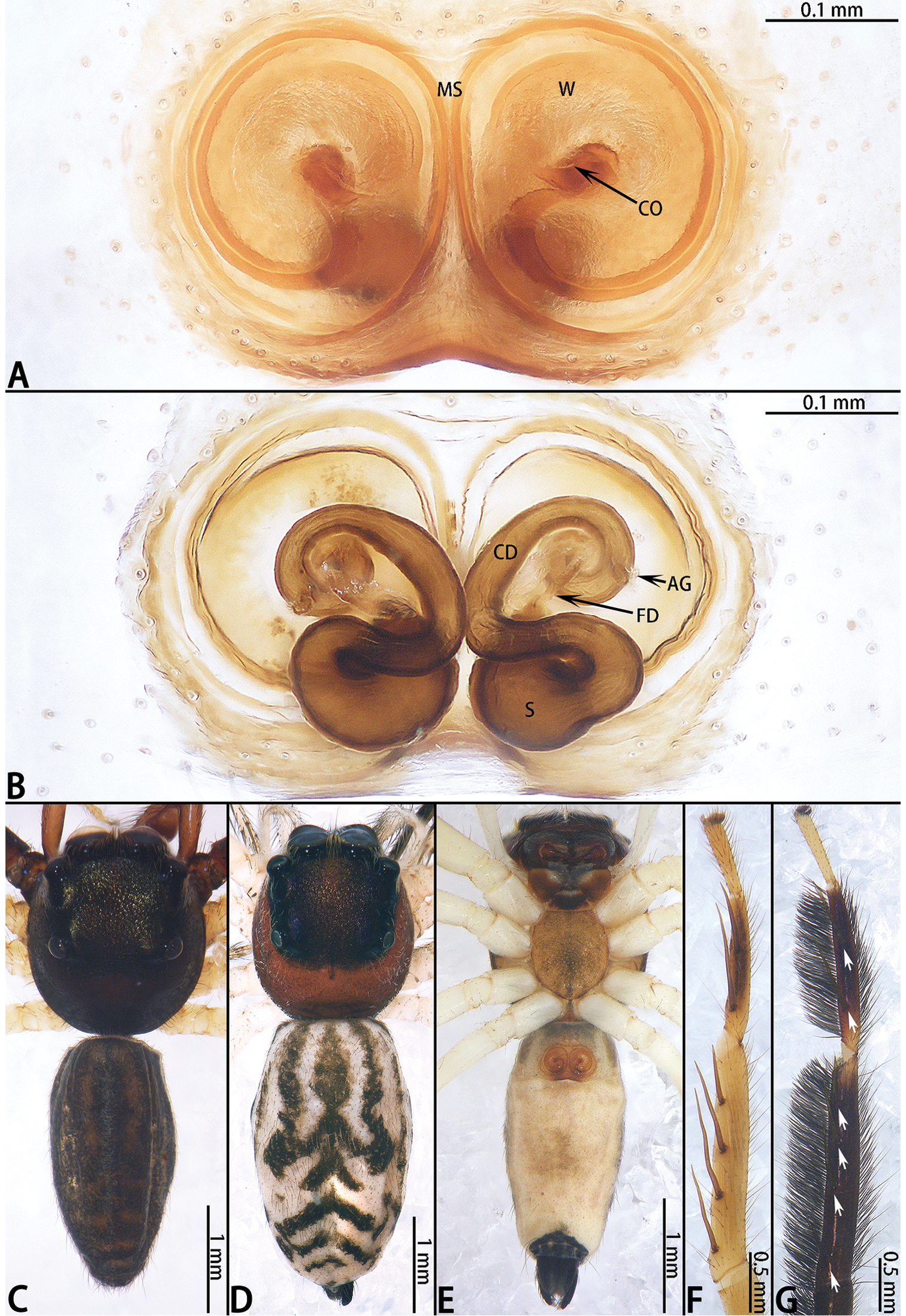
- Foliabitus weihangi sp. nov., female paratype and male holotype. A epigyne, ventral B vulva, dorsal C male holotype habitus, dorsal D female paratype habitus, dorsal E same, ventral F prolateral view of right leg I, female paratype G prolateral view of right leg I, male holotype.

Scientific classification
- Kingdom: Animalia
- Phylum: Arthropoda
- Subphylum: Chelicerata
- Class: Arachnida
- Order: Araneae
- Infraorder: Araneomorphae
- Family: Salticidae
- Subfamily: Salticinae
- Genus: Foliabitus; Zhang & Maddison, 2012

Type species
- F. longzhou Zhang & Maddison, 2012

Species
- F. longzhou Zhang & Maddison, 2012 – China; F. scutigerus (Zabka, 1985) – Vietnam

= Foliabitus =

Genus of spiders

Foliabitus is a genus of Asian jumping spiders that was first described by J. X. Zhang & Wayne Paul Maddison in 2012. As of June 2019 it contains only two species, found only in Asia: F. longzhou and F. scutigerus.
