= Darwinneon =

Scientific classification
- Kingdom: Animalia
- Phylum: Arthropoda
- Subphylum: Chelicerata
- Class: Arachnida
- Order: Araneae
- Infraorder: Araneomorphae
- Family: Salticidae
- Genus: Darwinneon; Cutler, 1971
- Species: D. crypticus

Binomial name
- Darwinneon crypticus Cutler, 1971

Genus of spiders

Darwinneon is a monotypic genus of jumping spiders containing the single species, Darwinneon crypticus. It was first described by B. Cutler in 1971, and is only found on the Galápagos Islands. The name is a combination of the Neon and Charles Darwin. Crypticus means "hidden" in Latin.
