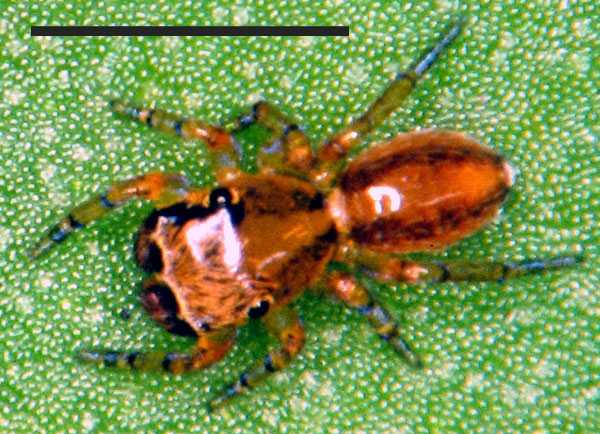
- Male Neonella vinnula

Scientific classification
- Kingdom: Animalia
- Phylum: Arthropoda
- Subphylum: Chelicerata
- Class: Arachnida
- Order: Araneae
- Infraorder: Araneomorphae
- Family: Salticidae
- Subfamily: Salticinae
- Genus: Neonella; Gertsch, 1936

Type species
- N. vinnula Gertsch, 1936

Species
- 14, see text

= Neonella =

Genus of spiders

Neonella is a genus of jumping spiders that was first described by Carl Eduard Adolph Gerstaecker in 1936. The name is a combination of the related spider genus Neon and the suffix "-ella".

== Species ==
As of July 2019 it contains fourteen species, found in the Caribbean, Paraguay, Brazil, Argentina, and the United States:

- Neonella acostae Rubio, Argañaraz & Gleiser, 2015 – Argentina
- Neonella antillana Galiano, 1988 – Jamaica
- Neonella camillae Edwards, 2003 – USA
- Neonella choanocytica Salgado & Ruiz, 2018 – Brazil
- Neonella colalao Galiano, 1998 – Argentina
- Neonella gyrinus Salgado & Ruiz, 2018 – Brazil
- Neonella lubrica Galiano, 1988 – Brazil, Paraguay
- Neonella mayaguez Galiano, 1998 – Puerto Rico
- Neonella minuta Galiano, 1965 – Brazil, Argentina
- Neonella montana Galiano, 1988 – Brazil, Argentina
- Neonella nana Galiano, 1988 – Paraguay
- Neonella noronha Ruiz, Brescovit & Freitas, 2007 – Brazil
- Neonella salafraria Ruiz & Brescovit, 2004 – Brazil
- Neonella vinnula Gertsch, 1936 (type) – USA
