= Parvattus =

Scientific classification
- Kingdom: Animalia
- Phylum: Arthropoda
- Subphylum: Chelicerata
- Class: Arachnida
- Order: Araneae
- Infraorder: Araneomorphae
- Family: Salticidae
- Genus: Parvattus; Zhang & Maddison, 2012
- Species: P. zhui

Binomial name
- Parvattus zhui Zhang & Maddison, 2012

Genus of spiders

Parvattus is a monotypic genus of Chinese jumping spiders containing the single species, Parvattus zhui. It was first described by J. X. Zhang & Wayne Paul Maddison in 2012, and is only found in China.
