= Bindax =

Scientific classification
- Kingdom: Animalia
- Phylum: Arthropoda
- Subphylum: Chelicerata
- Class: Arachnida
- Order: Araneae
- Infraorder: Araneomorphae
- Family: Salticidae
- Subfamily: Salticinae
- Genus: Bindax; Thorell, 1892

Type species
- B. chalcocephalus (Thorell, 1877)

Species
- B. chalcocephalus (Thorell, 1877) – Indonesia (Sulawesi); B. oscitans (Pocock, 1898) – Solomon Is.

Synonyms
- Eustirognathus Pocock, 1898

Genus of spiders

Bindax is a genus of jumping spiders that was first described by Tamerlan Thorell in 1892. As of June 2019 it contains only two species, found only on the Solomon Islands and Sulawesi: B. chalcocephalus and B. oscitans. The name is derived from Βίνδαξ, according to Thorell, a masculine name.
