= Frewena =

Scientific classification
- Kingdom: Animalia
- Phylum: Arthropoda
- Subphylum: Chelicerata
- Class: Arachnida
- Order: Araneae
- Infraorder: Araneomorphae
- Family: Salticidae
- Genus: Frewena; Richardson, 2013
- Species: F. maculata

Binomial name
- Frewena maculata Richardson, 2013

Genus of spiders

Frewena is a monotypic genus of jumping spiders containing the single species, Frewena maculata. It was first described by B. J. Richardson in 2013, and is only found in the Northern Territory.
