= Mopiopia =

- Mopiopia comatula

Scientific classification
- Kingdom: Animalia
- Phylum: Arthropoda
- Subphylum: Chelicerata
- Class: Arachnida
- Order: Araneae
- Infraorder: Araneomorphae
- Family: Salticidae
- Subfamily: Salticinae
- Genus: Mopiopia; Simon, 1902

Type species
- M. comatula Simon, 1902

Species
- 8, see text

Synonyms
- Tariona Simon, 1902

Genus of spiders

Mopiopia is a genus of jumping spiders that was first described by Eugène Louis Simon in 1902.

== Species ==
As of July 2019 it contains eight species, found only in Brazil and the Greater Antilles:

- Mopiopia albibarbis (Mello-Leitão, 1947) – Brazil
- Mopiopia bruneti (Simon, 1903) – Brazil
- Mopiopia comatula Simon, 1902 (type) – Brazil
- Mopiopia gounellei (Simon, 1902) – Brazil
- Mopiopia labyrinthea (Mello-Leitão, 1947) – Brazil
- Mopiopia maculata (Franganillo, 1930) – Cuba
- Mopiopia mutica (Simon, 1903) – Brazil
- Mopiopia tristis (Mello-Leitão, 1947) – Brazil
