= Aruattus =

Scientific classification
- Kingdom: Animalia
- Phylum: Arthropoda
- Subphylum: Chelicerata
- Class: Arachnida
- Order: Araneae
- Infraorder: Araneomorphae
- Family: Salticidae
- Genus: Aruattus; Logunov & Azarkina, 2008
- Species: A. agostii

Binomial name
- Aruattus agostii Logunov & Azarkina, 2008

Genus of spiders

Aruattus is a monotypic genus of Indonesian jumping spiders containing the single species, Aruattus agostii. It was first described by D. V. Logunov & G. N. Azarkina in 2008, and is only found in Indonesia. The name is a combination of the Aru Islands, and attus, a prefix often used for salticid genera, meaning "jumper". The species is named after its collector, D. Agosti.
