= Spilargis =

Scientific classification
- Kingdom: Animalia
- Phylum: Arthropoda
- Subphylum: Chelicerata
- Class: Arachnida
- Order: Araneae
- Infraorder: Araneomorphae
- Family: Salticidae
- Genus: Spilargis; Simon, 1902
- Species: S. ignicolor

Binomial name
- Spilargis ignicolor Simon, 1902

Genus of spiders

Spilargis is a monotypic genus of jumping spiders containing the single species, Spilargis ignicolor. It was first described by Eugène Louis Simon in 1902, and is found only in Papua New Guinea and on the Moluccas. A subspecies, Spilargis ignicolor bimaculata, is found on the Moluccas. The name is a combination of the Ancient Greek roots spil- "spot" and arg- "shining". The species name is Latin for "the color of fire". bimaculata is Latin for "with two spots".
