= Antillattus =

Scientific classification
- Kingdom: Animalia
- Phylum: Arthropoda
- Subphylum: Chelicerata
- Class: Arachnida
- Order: Araneae
- Infraorder: Araneomorphae
- Family: Salticidae
- Subfamily: Salticinae
- Genus: Antillattus; Bryant, 1943

Type species
- A. gracilis Bryant, 1943

Species
- 13, see text

Genus of spiders

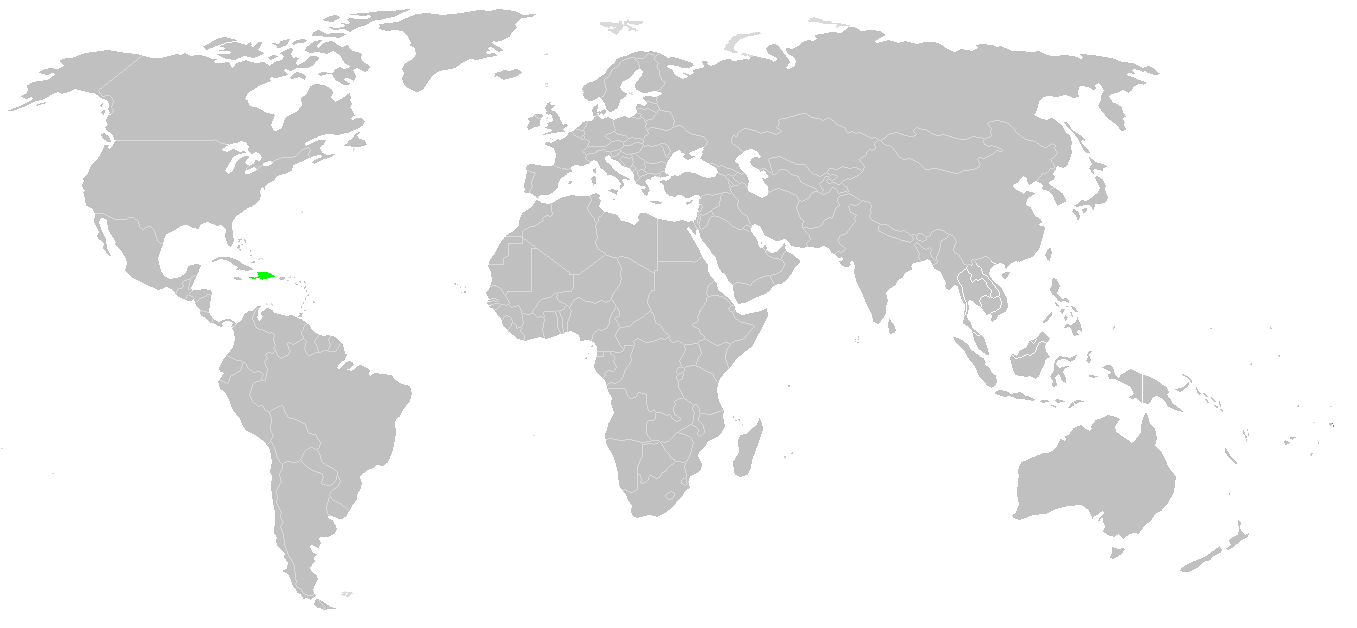
Distribution

Antillattus is a genus of Caribbean jumping spiders that was first described by E. B. Bryant in 1943. The name is a combination of "Antilles" and the common ending for salticid genera -attus.

== Species ==
As of June 2019 it contains thirteen species, found only in Cuba and on the Greater Antilles:

- Antillattus applanatus Zhang & Maddison, 2012 – Hispaniola
- Antillattus cambridgei (Bryant, 1943) – Hispaniola
- Antillattus cubensis (Franganillo, 1935) – Cuba
- Antillattus darlingtoni (Bryant, 1943) – Hispaniola
- Antillattus electus (Bryant, 1943) – Hispaniola
- Antillattus gracilis Bryant, 1943 (type) – Hispaniola
- Antillattus keyserlingi (Bryant, 1940) – Cuba
- Antillattus mandibulatus (Bryant, 1940) – Cuba
- Antillattus maxillosus (Bryant, 1943) – Hispaniola
- Antillattus montanus (Bryant, 1943) – Hispaniola
- Antillattus peckhami (Bryant, 1943) – Hispaniola
- Antillattus placidus Bryant, 1943 – Hispaniola
- Antillattus scutiformis Zhang & Maddison, 2015 – Hispaniola
