= Charippus =

Scientific classification
- Kingdom: Animalia
- Phylum: Arthropoda
- Subphylum: Chelicerata
- Class: Arachnida
- Order: Araneae
- Infraorder: Araneomorphae
- Family: Salticidae
- Subfamily: Salticinae
- Genus: Charippus; Thorell, 1895

Type species
- Charippus errans Thorell, 1895

Species
- 11, see text

Genus of spiders

Charippus is a genus of spiders in the jumping spider family, Salticidae.

The genus name is derived from Ancient Greek Χάριππος, (literally, "graceful rider"), according to Thorell taken from Persian mythology.

== Species ==
As of May 2022 it contains eleven species, found in Asia:

- Charippus asper Yu, Maddison & Zhang, 2022 – Borneo
- Charippus bukittimah Yu, Maddison & Zhang, 2022 – Singapore
- Charippus callainus Yu, Maddison & Zhang, 2022 – Borneo
- Charippus denjii Yu, Maddison & Zhang, 2022 – Hainan
- Charippus errans Thorell, 1895 – Myanmar
- Charippus heishiding Yu, Maddison & Zhang, 2022 – China
- Charippus kubah Yu, Maddison & Zhang, 2022 – Borneo
- Charippus minotaurus Yu, Maddison & Zhang, 2022 – Borneo
- Charippus wanlessi Yu, Maddison & Zhang, 2022 – Borneo
- Charippus yinae Wang & Li, 2020 – China
- Charippus yunnanensis (Cao & Li, 2016) – China
