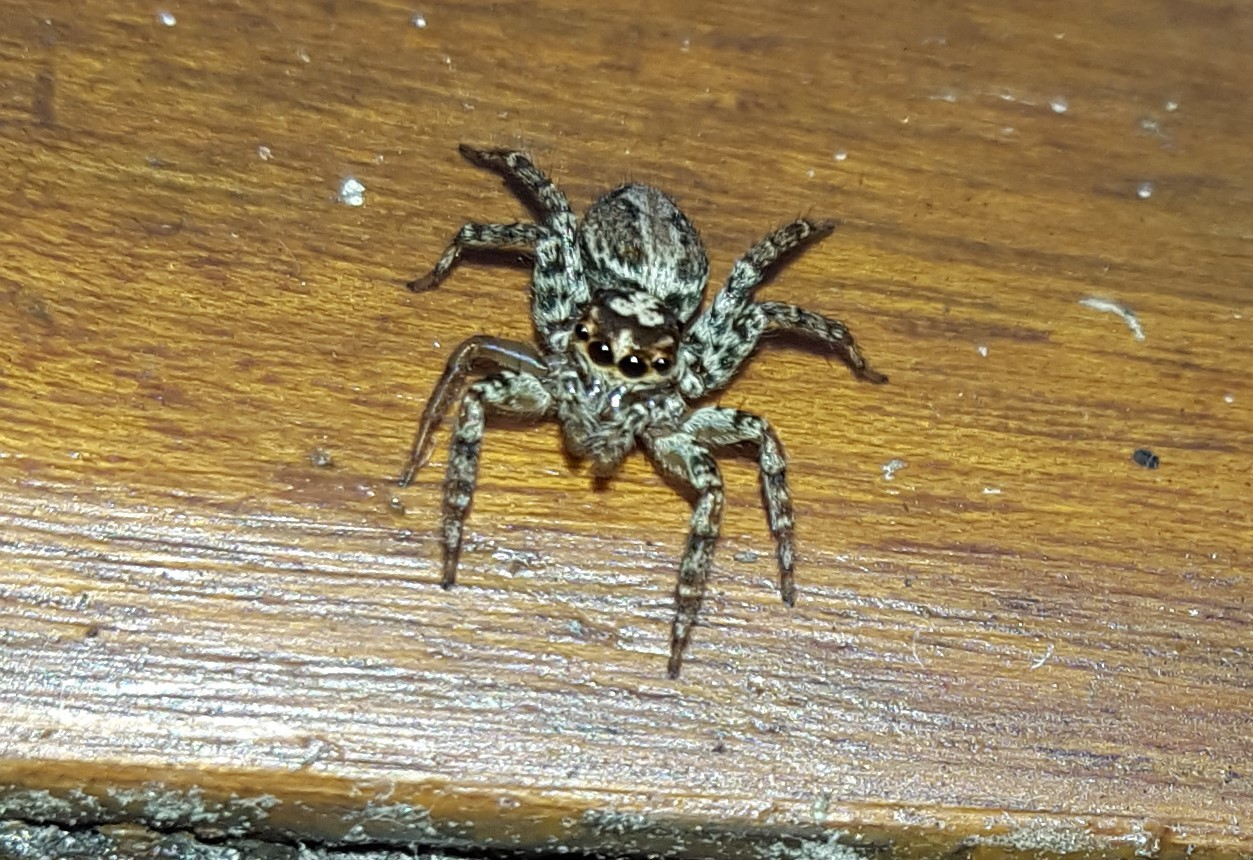
- Asaphobelis physonychus pictured in São Paulo, Brazil

Scientific classification
- Kingdom: Animalia
- Phylum: Arthropoda
- Subphylum: Chelicerata
- Class: Arachnida
- Order: Araneae
- Infraorder: Araneomorphae
- Family: Salticidae
- Subfamily: Salticinae
- Genus: Asaphobelis; Simon, 1902
- Species: A. physonychus

Binomial name
- Asaphobelis physonychus Simon, 1902

= Asaphobelis =

Genus of spiders

Asaphobelis is a monotypic genus of Brazilian jumping spiders containing the single species, Asaphobelis physonychus. It was first described by Eugène Louis Simon in 1902, and is only found in Brazil.
