= Featheroides =

Scientific classification
- Kingdom: Animalia
- Phylum: Arthropoda
- Subphylum: Chelicerata
- Class: Arachnida
- Order: Araneae
- Infraorder: Araneomorphae
- Family: Salticidae
- Subfamily: Salticinae
- Genus: Featheroides; Peng, Yin, Xie & Kim, 1994

Type species
- F. typica Peng, Yin, Xie & Kim, 1994

Species
- F. typica Peng, Yin, Xie & Kim, 1994 – China; F. yunnanensis Peng, Yin, Xie & Kim, 1994 – China

Genus of spiders

Featheroides is a genus of Chinese jumping spiders that was first described by X. J. Peng in 1994. As of June 2019 it contains only two species, found only in China: F. typica and F. yunnanensis.
