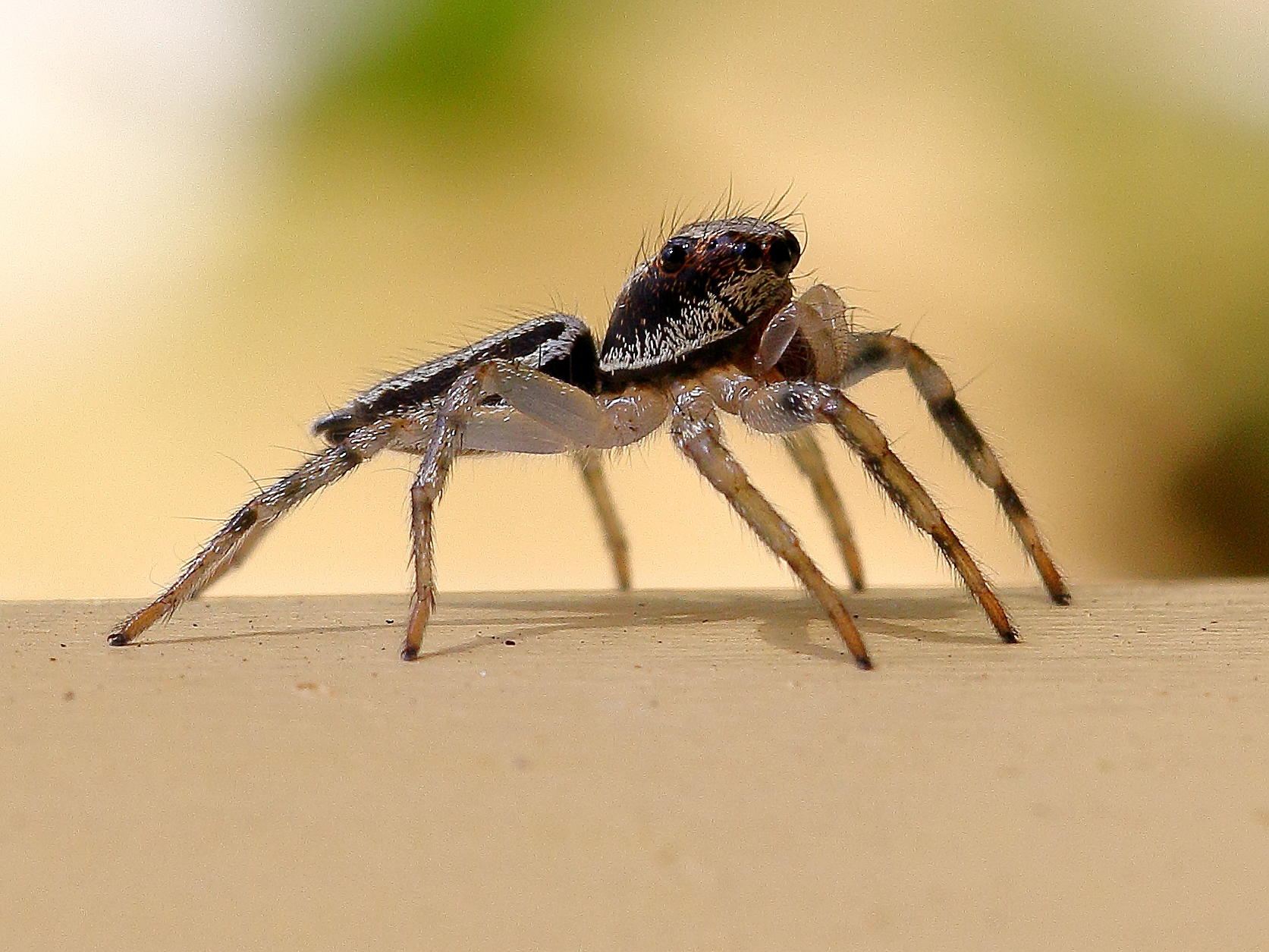
- Omoedus swiftorum

Scientific classification
- Kingdom: Animalia
- Phylum: Arthropoda
- Subphylum: Chelicerata
- Class: Arachnida
- Order: Araneae
- Infraorder: Araneomorphae
- Family: Salticidae
- Subfamily: Salticinae
- Genus: Omoedus; Thorell, 1881

Type species
- O. niger Thorell, 1881

Species
- 7, see text

= Omoedus =

Genus of spiders

Omoedus is a genus of jumping spiders (family Salticidae).

== Taxonomy ==
Omoedus was first described by Tamerlan Thorell in 1881. In 2015, Junxia Zhang and Wayne Maddison synonymized Pystira with Omoedus, but this was rejected by rejected by Jerzy Prószyński in 2017, and both genera are accepted by the World Spider Catalog as of August 2020.

The genus is placed in the subfamily Salticinae, tribe Euophryini.

=== Species ===
As of August 2019 it contains seven species, found on Fiji, in Papua New Guinea, on the Aru Islands, and the Moluccas:

- Omoedus cordatus Berry, Beatty & Prószyński, 1996 – Fiji
- Omoedus insultans (Thorell, 1881) – New Guinea
- Omoedus kulczynskii Prószyński, 1971 – New Guinea
- Omoedus niger Thorell, 1881 (type) – New Guinea
- Omoedus piceus Simon, 1902 – Indonesia (Moluccas), New Guinea
- Omoedus sexualis (Strand, 1911) – Indonesia (Aru Is.)
- Omoedus torquatus (Simon, 1902) – Indonesia (Moluccas)
