= Popcornella =

Scientific classification
- Kingdom: Animalia
- Phylum: Arthropoda
- Subphylum: Chelicerata
- Class: Arachnida
- Order: Araneae
- Infraorder: Araneomorphae
- Family: Salticidae
- Subfamily: Salticinae
- Genus: Popcornella; Zhang & Maddison, 2012

Type species
- P. spiniformis Zhang & Maddison, 2012

Species
- 4, see text

Genus of spiders

Popcornella is a genus of Caribbean jumping spiders that was first described by J. X. Zhang & Wayne Paul Maddison in 2012.

== Species ==
As of August 2019 it contains four species, found only in Puerto Rico and on Hispaniola:

- Popcornella furcata Zhang & Maddison, 2012 – Hispaniola
- Popcornella nigromaculata Zhang & Maddison, 2012 – Puerto Rico
- Popcornella spiniformis Zhang & Maddison, 2012 (type) – Hispaniola
- Popcornella yunque Zhang & Maddison, 2012 – Puerto Rico
