= Saitissus =

Scientific classification
- Kingdom: Animalia
- Phylum: Arthropoda
- Subphylum: Chelicerata
- Class: Arachnida
- Order: Araneae
- Infraorder: Araneomorphae
- Family: Salticidae
- Genus: Saitissus; Roewer, 1938
- Species: S. squamosus

Binomial name
- Saitissus squamosus Roewer, 1938

Genus of spiders

Saitissus is a monotypic genus of Papuan jumping spiders containing the single species, Saitissus squamosus. It was first described by Carl Friedrich Roewer in 1938, and is found only in Papua New Guinea. The genus name is derived from the similar genus Saitis. The species name is Latin for "scaly".
