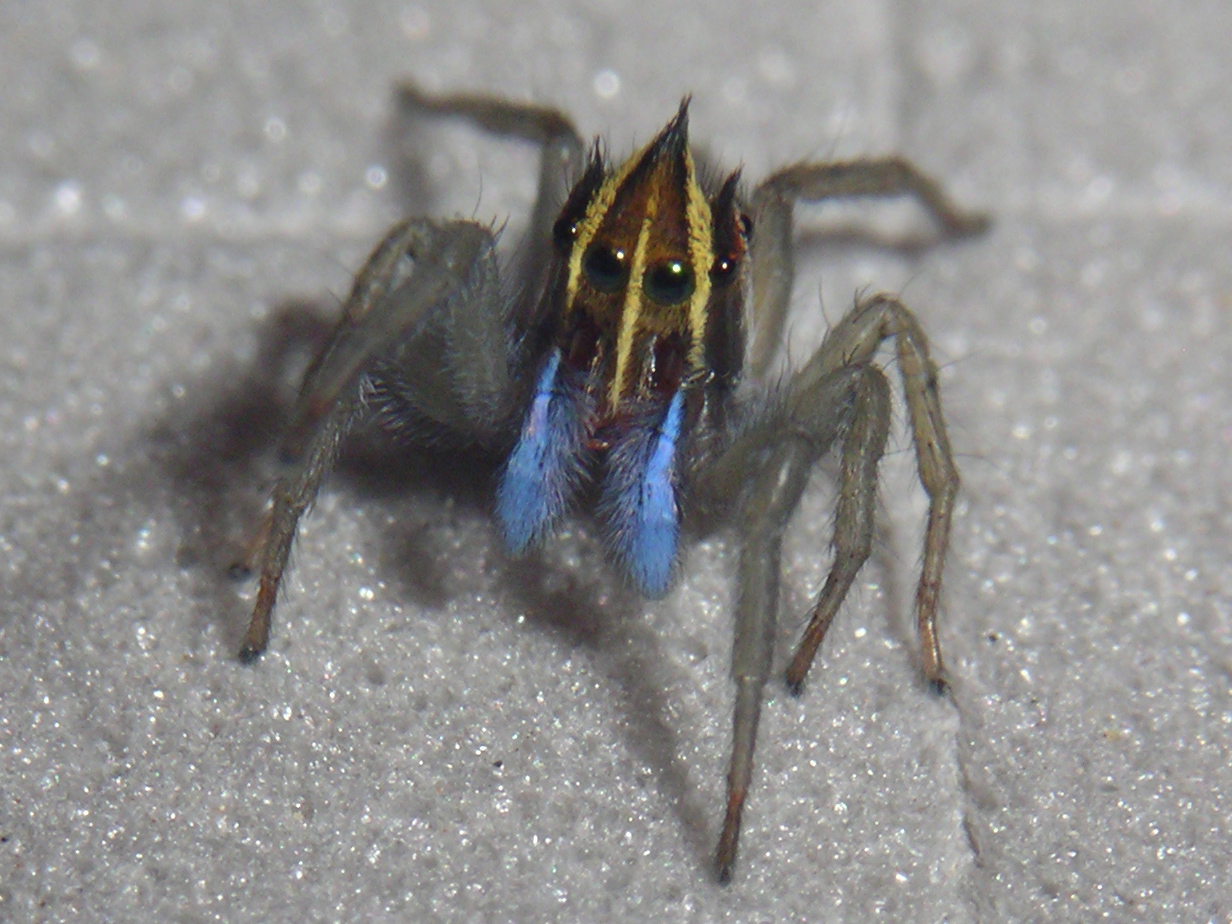
- Male Ilargus sp. from Ecuador

Scientific classification
- Kingdom: Animalia
- Phylum: Arthropoda
- Subphylum: Chelicerata
- Class: Arachnida
- Order: Araneae
- Infraorder: Araneomorphae
- Family: Salticidae
- Subfamily: Salticinae
- Genus: Ilargus; Simon, 1901

Type species
- Ilargus coccineus Simon, 1901

Species
- See text.

= Ilargus =

Genus of spiders

Ilargus is a genus of the spider family Salticidae (jumping spiders).

== Species ==
As of June 2017, the World Spider Catalog lists the following species in the genus:

- Ilargus coccineus Simon, 1901 – Brazil
- Ilargus florezi Galvis, 2015 – Colombia
- Ilargus foliosus Zhang & Maddison, 2012 – Ecuador
- Ilargus galianoae Zhang & Maddison, 2012 – Ecuador
- Ilargus macrocornis Zhang & Maddison, 2012 – Ecuador
- Ilargus moronatigus Zhang & Maddison, 2012 – Ecuador
- Ilargus nitidisquamulatus Soares & Camargo, 1948 – Brazil
- Ilargus pilleolus Zhang & Maddison, 2012 – Ecuador
- Ilargus serratus Zhang & Maddison, 2012 – Ecuador
- Ilargus singularis Caporiacco, 1955 – Venezuela
