= Pseudocorythalia =

Scientific classification
- Kingdom: Animalia
- Phylum: Arthropoda
- Subphylum: Chelicerata
- Class: Arachnida
- Order: Araneae
- Infraorder: Araneomorphae
- Family: Salticidae
- Genus: Pseudocorythalia; Caporiacco, 1938
- Species: P. subinermis

Binomial name
- Pseudocorythalia subinermis Caporiacco, 1938

Genus of spiders

Pseudocorythalia is a monotypic genus of Guatemalan jumping spiders containing the single species, Pseudocorythalia subinermis. It was first described by Lodovico di Caporiacco in 1938, and is found only in Guatemala. The name is a combination of the Ancient Greek "pseudo-" (ψευδής), meaning "false", and the salticid genus name Corythalia.
