= Phasmolia =

Scientific classification
- Kingdom: Animalia
- Phylum: Arthropoda
- Subphylum: Chelicerata
- Class: Arachnida
- Order: Araneae
- Infraorder: Araneomorphae
- Family: Salticidae
- Genus: Phasmolia; Zhang & Maddison, 2012
- Species: P. elegans

Binomial name
- Phasmolia elegans Zhang & Maddison, 2012

Genus of spiders

Phasmolia is a monotypic genus of Papuan jumping spiders containing the single species, Phasmolia elegans. It was first described by J. X. Zhang & Wayne Paul Maddison in 2012, and is only found in Papua New Guinea.
