= Lakarobius =

Scientific classification
- Kingdom: Animalia
- Phylum: Arthropoda
- Subphylum: Chelicerata
- Class: Arachnida
- Order: Araneae
- Infraorder: Araneomorphae
- Family: Salticidae
- Genus: Lakarobius; Berry, Beatty & Prószynski, 1998
- Species: L. alboniger

Binomial name
- Lakarobius alboniger Berry, Beatty & Prószyński, 1998

Genus of spiders

Lakarobius is a spider genus of the jumping spider family, Salticidae. Its only species, Lakarobius alboniger, is endemic to Fiji.

== Name ==
Lakarobius signifies living in trees, from Greek lakara, a kind of tree, and bios, life. The epitheton alboniger means "white-black", because of the spider's black and white dorsal pattern.
