= Corticattus =

Scientific classification
- Kingdom: Animalia
- Phylum: Arthropoda
- Subphylum: Chelicerata
- Class: Arachnida
- Order: Araneae
- Infraorder: Araneomorphae
- Family: Salticidae
- Subfamily: Salticinae
- Genus: Corticattus; Zhang & Maddison, 2012

Type species
- C. latus Zhang & Maddison, 2012

Species
- C. guajataca Zhang & Maddison, 2012 – Puerto Rico; C. latus Zhang & Maddison, 2012 – Hispaniola

Genus of spiders

Corticattus is a genus of Caribbean jumping spiders that was first described by J. X. Zhang & Wayne Paul Maddison in 2012. As of June 2019 it contains only two species, found only on Hispaniola and in Puerto Rico: C. guajataca and C. latus.
