= Semnolius =

Scientific classification
- Kingdom: Animalia
- Phylum: Arthropoda
- Subphylum: Chelicerata
- Class: Arachnida
- Order: Araneae
- Infraorder: Araneomorphae
- Family: Salticidae
- Subfamily: Salticinae
- Genus: Semnolius; Simon, 1902

Type species
- S. chrysotrichus Simon, 1902

Species
- 6, see text

Synonyms
- Ocnotelus Simon, 1902

Genus of spiders

Semnolius is a genus of South American jumping spiders that was first described by Eugène Louis Simon in 1902.

== Species ==
As of August 2019 it contains six species, found only in Brazil and Argentina:

- Semnolius albofasciatus Mello-Leitão, 1941 – Argentina
- Semnolius brunneus Mello-Leitão, 1945 – Argentina
- Semnolius chrysotrichus Simon, 1902 (type) – Brazil
- Semnolius imberbis (Simon, 1902) – Brazil
- Semnolius lunatus (Mello-Leitão, 1947) – Brazil
- Semnolius rubrolunatus (Mello-Leitão, 1945) – Argentina
