= Bythocrotus =

Scientific classification
- Kingdom: Animalia
- Phylum: Arthropoda
- Subphylum: Chelicerata
- Class: Arachnida
- Order: Araneae
- Infraorder: Araneomorphae
- Family: Salticidae
- Subfamily: Salticinae
- Genus: Bythocrotus; Simon, 1903

Type species
- B. cephalotes (Simon, 1888)

Species
- B. cephalotes (Simon, 1888) – Hispaniola; B. crypticus Zhang & Maddison, 2012 – Hispaniola

Genus of spiders

Bythocrotus is a genus of Caribbean jumping spiders that was first described by Eugène Louis Simon in 1903. As of June 2019 it contains only two species, found only on Hispaniola: Bythocrotus cephalotes and Bythocrotus crypticus.
