= Zabkattus =

Scientific classification
- Kingdom: Animalia
- Phylum: Arthropoda
- Subphylum: Chelicerata
- Class: Arachnida
- Order: Araneae
- Infraorder: Araneomorphae
- Family: Salticidae
- Subfamily: Salticinae
- Genus: Zabkattus; Zhang & Maddison, 2012

Type species
- Z. brevis Zhang & Maddison, 2012

Species
- 4, see text

Genus of spiders

Zabkattus is a genus of Papuan jumping spiders that was first described by J. X. Zhang & Wayne Paul Maddison in 2012.

== Species ==
As of September 2019 it contains four species, found in Papua New Guinea:

- Zabkattus brevis Zhang & Maddison, 2012 (type) – New Guinea
- Zabkattus furcatus Zhang & Maddison, 2012 – New Guinea
- Zabkattus richardsi Zhang & Maddison, 2012 – New Guinea
- Zabkattus trapeziformis Zhang & Maddison, 2012 – New Guinea
