= Barraina =

Scientific classification
- Kingdom: Animalia
- Phylum: Arthropoda
- Subphylum: Chelicerata
- Class: Arachnida
- Order: Araneae
- Infraorder: Araneomorphae
- Family: Salticidae
- Subfamily: Salticinae
- Genus: Barraina; Richardson, 2013

Species
- 6, see text

Genus of spiders

Barraina is a genus of jumping spiders, first described by B. J. Richardson in 2013.

== Species ==
As of May 2022 it contains six species, found only in Australia:

- Barraina abbedar Richardson, 2022 — New South Wales
- Barraina anfracta Richardson, 2013 — Queensland
- Barraina banyabba Richardson, 2022 — New South Wales
- Barraina melanoros Richardson, 2022 — Capital Territory
- Barraina occidentalis Richardson, 2022 — Western Australia
- Barraina pilata Richardson, 2022 — New South Wales
