= Truncattus =

Scientific classification
- Kingdom: Animalia
- Phylum: Arthropoda
- Subphylum: Chelicerata
- Class: Arachnida
- Order: Araneae
- Infraorder: Araneomorphae
- Family: Salticidae
- Subfamily: Salticinae
- Genus: Truncattus; Zhang & Maddison, 2012

Type species
- T. flavus Zhang & Maddison, 2012

Species
- 5, see text

Genus of spiders

Truncattus is a genus of Caribbean jumping spiders that was first described by J. X. Zhang & Wayne Paul Maddison in 2012.

== Species ==
As of August 2019 it contains five species, found only in the Dominican Republic, Haiti, and on the Greater Antilles:

- Truncattus cachotensis Zhang & Maddison, 2012 – Hispaniola
- Truncattus dominicanus Zhang & Maddison, 2012 – Hispaniola
- Truncattus flavus Zhang & Maddison, 2012 (type) – Hispaniola
- Truncattus manni (Bryant, 1943) – Hispaniola (Haiti)
- Truncattus mendicus (Bryant, 1943) – Hispaniola (Dominican Rep.)
