= Belliena =

Scientific classification
- Kingdom: Animalia
- Phylum: Arthropoda
- Subphylum: Chelicerata
- Class: Arachnida
- Order: Araneae
- Infraorder: Araneomorphae
- Family: Salticidae
- Subfamily: Salticinae
- Genus: Belliena; Simon, 1902

Type species
- B. biocellosa Simon, 1902

Species
- 5, see text

Genus of spiders

Belliena is a genus of jumping spiders that was first described by Eugène Louis Simon in 1902.

== Species ==
As of June 2019 it contains five species, found only in Ecuador, Venezuela, and on Trinidad:

- Belliena biocellosa Simon, 1902 (type) – Venezuela
- Belliena ecuadorica Zhang & Maddison, 2012 – Ecuador
- Belliena flavimana Simon, 1902 – Venezuela
- Belliena phalerata Simon, 1902 – Venezuela
- Belliena scotti Hogg, 1918 – Trinidad
