= Lauharulla =

Scientific classification
- Kingdom: Animalia
- Phylum: Arthropoda
- Subphylum: Chelicerata
- Class: Arachnida
- Order: Araneae
- Infraorder: Araneomorphae
- Family: Salticidae
- Subfamily: Salticinae
- Genus: Lauharulla; Keyserling, 1883

Type species
- Lauharulla pretiosa Keyserling, 1883

Species
- See text.

Genus of spiders

Lauharulla is a spider genus of the jumping spider family, Salticidae.

== Species ==
- Lauharulla insulana Simon, 1901 (Tahiti)
- Lauharulla pretiosa Keyserling, 1883 (New South Wales)
