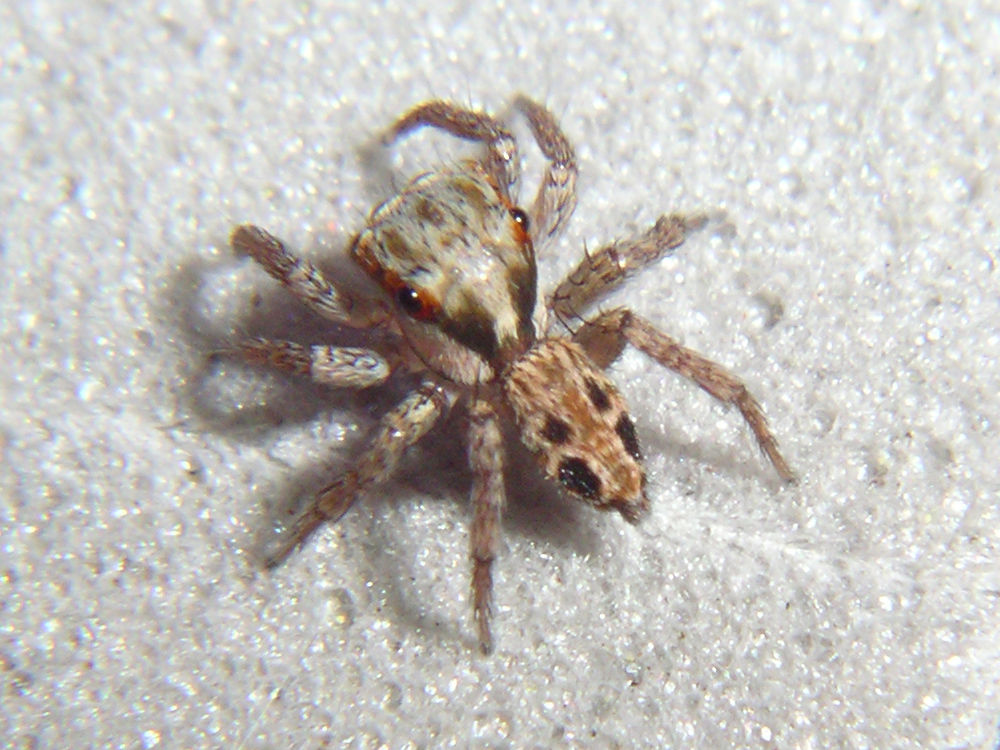
- Male Agobardus gramineus from the Dominican Republic

Scientific classification
- Kingdom: Animalia
- Phylum: Arthropoda
- Subphylum: Chelicerata
- Class: Arachnida
- Order: Araneae
- Infraorder: Araneomorphae
- Family: Salticidae
- Subfamily: Salticinae
- Genus: Agobardus; Keyserling, 1885

Type species
- A. anormalis Keyserling, 1885

Species
- 16, see text

= Agobardus =

Genus of spiders

Agobardus is a genus of jumping spiders that was first described by Eugen von Keyserling in 1885.

== Species ==
As of June 2019, it contains sixteen species and one subspecies, found only in the Caribbean:

- Agobardus anormalis Keyserling, 1885 (type) – Caribbean
  - Agobardus a. montanus Bryant, 1943 – Hispaniola
- Agobardus bahoruco Zhang & Maddison, 2012 – Hispaniola
- Agobardus blandus Bryant, 1947 – Puerto Rico
- Agobardus brevitarsus Bryant, 1943 – Hispaniola
- Agobardus cordiformis Zhang & Maddison, 2012 – Hispaniola
- Agobardus cubanus (Bryant, 1940) – Cuba
- Agobardus fimbriatus Bryant, 1940 – Cuba
- Agobardus gramineus Zhang & Maddison, 2012 – Hispaniola
- Agobardus minutus (Bryant, 1940) – Cuba
- Agobardus modestus (Bryant, 1943) – Hispaniola
- Agobardus mundus Bryant, 1940 – Cuba
- Agobardus obscurus Bryant, 1943 – Hispaniola
- Agobardus oviedo Zhang & Maddison, 2012 – Hispaniola
- Agobardus perpilosus Bryant, 1943 – Hispaniola
- Agobardus phylladiphilus Zhang & Maddison, 2012 – Hispaniola
- Agobardus prominens Bryant, 1940 – Cuba
