= Athamas (spider) =

Scientific classification
- Kingdom: Animalia
- Phylum: Arthropoda
- Subphylum: Chelicerata
- Class: Arachnida
- Order: Araneae
- Infraorder: Araneomorphae
- Family: Salticidae
- Subfamily: Salticinae
- Genus: Athamas; O. Pickard-Cambridge, 1877

Type species
- A. whitmeei O. Pickard-Cambridge, 1877

Species
- 7, see text

Genus of spiders

Athamas is a genus of jumping spiders that was first described by Octavius Pickard-Cambridge in 1877. The name is derived from Athamas, the king of Orchomenus in Greek mythology.

== Species ==
As of June 2019 it contains seven species, found on Vanuatu, Palau, in Papua New Guinea, on the Polynesian Islands, and Tahiti:

- Athamas debakkeri Szüts, 2003 – Papua New Guinea (New Ireland)
- Athamas guineensis Jendrzejewska, 1995 – New Guinea
- Athamas kochi Jendrzejewska, 1995 – Tahiti
- Athamas nitidus Jendrzejewska, 1995 – New Guinea
- Athamas proszynskii Ono, 2011 – Palau Is.
- Athamas tahitensis Jendrzejewska, 1995 – French Polynesia (Society Is.: Tahiti)
- Athamas whitmeei O. Pickard-Cambridge, 1877 (type) – Vanuatu, Polynesia
