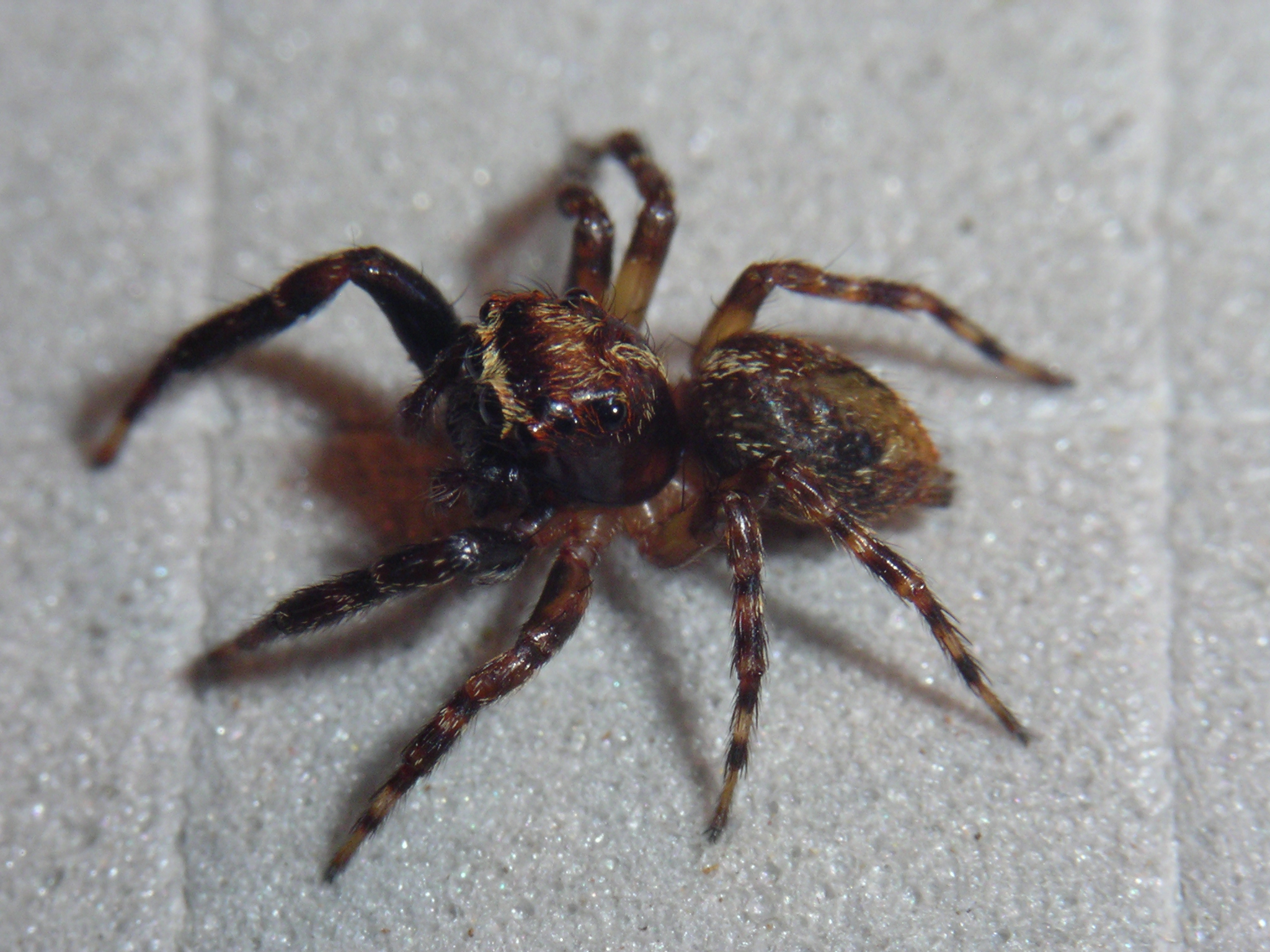
- Male Ecuadattus typicus in Ecuador

Scientific classification
- Kingdom: Animalia
- Phylum: Arthropoda
- Subphylum: Chelicerata
- Class: Arachnida
- Order: Araneae
- Infraorder: Araneomorphae
- Family: Salticidae
- Subfamily: Salticinae
- Genus: Ecuadattus; Zhang & Maddison, 2012

Type species
- E. typicus Zhang & Maddison, 2012

Species
- 4, see text

= Ecuadattus =

Genus of spiders

Ecuadattus is a genus of Ecuadorian jumping spiders that was first described by J. X. Zhang & Wayne Paul Maddison in 2012.

== Species ==
As of June 2019 it contains four species, found only in Ecuador:

- Ecuadattus elongatus Zhang & Maddison, 2012 – Ecuador
- Ecuadattus napoensis Zhang & Maddison, 2012 – Ecuador
- Ecuadattus pichincha Zhang & Maddison, 2012 – Ecuador
- Ecuadattus typicus Zhang & Maddison, 2012 (type) – Ecuador
