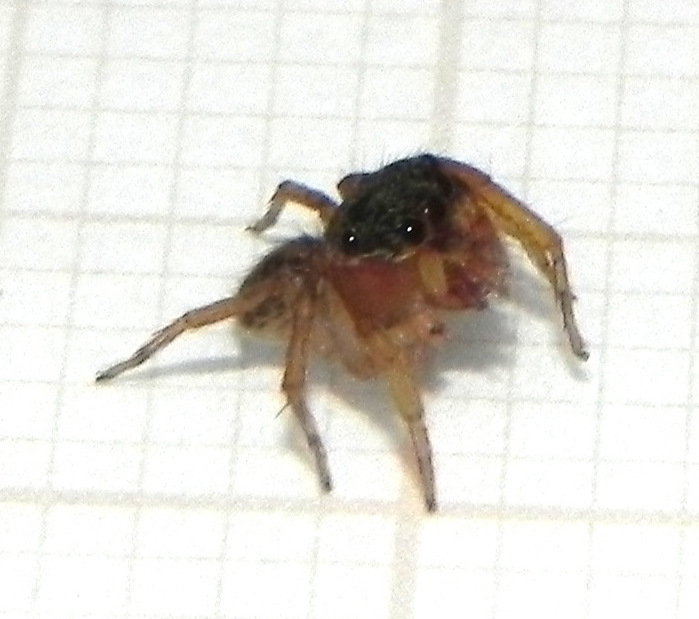
- R. cymbialis from Brazil

Scientific classification
- Kingdom: Animalia
- Phylum: Arthropoda
- Subphylum: Chelicerata
- Class: Arachnida
- Order: Araneae
- Infraorder: Araneomorphae
- Family: Salticidae
- Subfamily: Salticinae
- Genus: Rhyphelia; Simon, 1902

Synonyms
- Soesilarishius Makhan, 2007

= Rhyphelia =

Genus of spiders

Rhyphelia is a genus of South American jumping spiders. It was first described by Eugène Louis Simon in 1902, with most species endemic to Brazil.

== Species ==
As of December 2025, this genus includes 34 species:

- Rhyphelia albipes (Ruiz, 2011) – Brazil
- Rhyphelia amrishi (Makhan, 2007) – Suriname, Brazil
- Rhyphelia aurifrons (Taczanowski, 1878) – Peru, French Guiana
- Rhyphelia barbado Nobre & Ruiz, 2024 – Brazil
- Rhyphelia bicrescens (Ruiz, 2013) – Brazil
- Rhyphelia bilineata Nobre & Ruiz, 2024 – Brazil
- Rhyphelia brevistylus Nobre & Ruiz, 2024 – Brazil
- Rhyphelia cearensis (Ruiz, 2013) – Brazil
- Rhyphelia chaplini (Ruiz, 2013) – Brazil
- Rhyphelia cotriguacuensis Nobre & Ruiz, 2024 – Brazil
- Rhyphelia crispiventer (Ruiz, 2011) – Brazil
- Rhyphelia cymbialis (Ruiz, 2011) – Brazil
- Rhyphelia dromedarius (Ruiz, 2011) – Brazil
- Rhyphelia elongatula (Ruiz & Sobrinho, 2016) – Brazil
- Rhyphelia excentrica (Ruiz, 2013) – Brazil
- Rhyphelia flagellator (Ruiz, 2013) – Brazil
- Rhyphelia gallina Nobre & Ruiz, 2024 – Brazil
- Rhyphelia laticlavus (Ruiz & Sobrinho, 2016) – Brazil
- Rhyphelia lunata (Ruiz, 2011) – Brazil
- Rhyphelia macrochelis (Ruiz, 2013) – Brazil
- Rhyphelia micacea (Zhang & Maddison, 2012) – Ecuador
- Rhyphelia minima (Ruiz, 2011) – Brazil
- Rhyphelia muiratinga (Ruiz, 2013) – Brazil
- Rhyphelia novalima Nobre & Ruiz, 2024 – Brazil
- Rhyphelia okay Nobre & Ruiz, 2024 – Brazil
- Rhyphelia otti Nobre & Ruiz, 2024 – Brazil
- Rhyphelia paxiuba (Ruiz, 2013) – Brazil
- Rhyphelia planaria Nobre & Ruiz, 2024 – Brazil
- Rhyphelia ruizi (Zhang & Maddison, 2012) – Brazil, French Guiana
- Rhyphelia spinipes (Ruiz, 2011) – Brazil
- Rhyphelia tabernarius (Ruiz, 2013) – Brazil
- Rhyphelia tocantinensis Nobre & Ruiz, 2024 – Brazil
- Rhyphelia trombetas (Ruiz & Sobrinho, 2016) – Brazil
- Rhyphelia variegata Simon, 1902 – Brazil (type species)
