= Petemathis =

Scientific classification
- Kingdom: Animalia
- Phylum: Arthropoda
- Subphylum: Chelicerata
- Class: Arachnida
- Order: Araneae
- Infraorder: Araneomorphae
- Family: Salticidae
- Subfamily: Salticinae
- Genus: Petemathis; Prószyński & Deeleman-Reinhold, 2012

Type species
- P. portoricensis (Petrunkevitch, 1930)

Species
- 5, see text

Genus of spiders

Petemathis is a genus of Caribbean jumping spiders that was first described by Jerzy Prószyński & Christa Laetitia Deeleman-Reinhold in 2012.

== Species ==
As of August 2019 it contains five species, found only in Cuba and on the Greater Antilles:

- Petemathis luteopunctata (Petrunkevitch, 1930) – Puerto Rico
- Petemathis minuta (Petrunkevitch, 1930) – Puerto Rico
- Petemathis portoricensis (Petrunkevitch, 1930) (type) – Puerto Rico
- Petemathis tetuani (Petrunkevitch, 1930) – Puerto Rico
- Petemathis unispina (Franganillo, 1930) – Cuba
