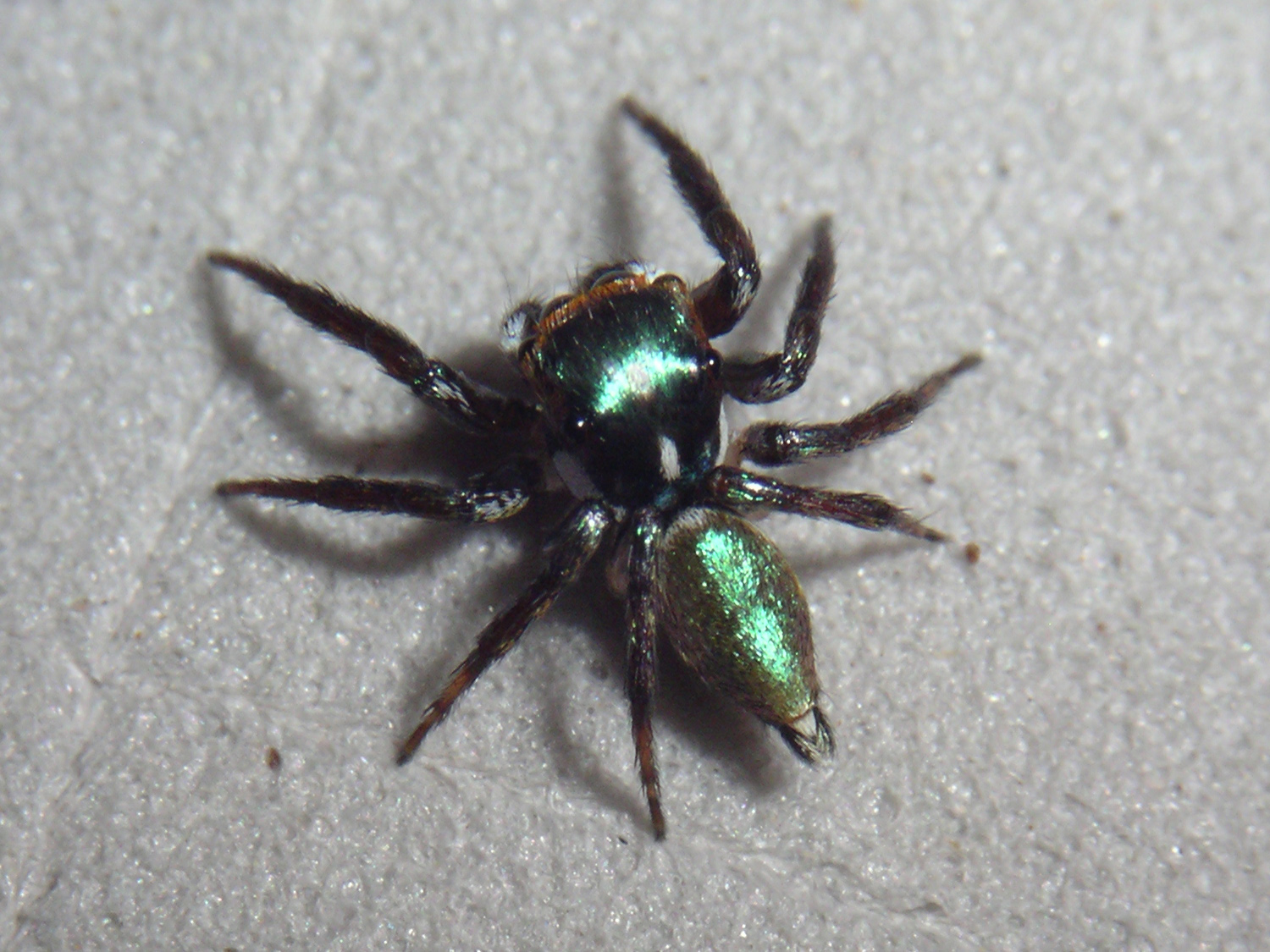
- Male Chapoda recondita in Veracruz, Mexico

Scientific classification
- Kingdom: Animalia
- Phylum: Arthropoda
- Subphylum: Chelicerata
- Class: Arachnida
- Order: Araneae
- Infraorder: Araneomorphae
- Family: Salticidae
- Subfamily: Salticinae
- Genus: Chapoda; Peckham & Peckham, 1896

Type species
- C. festiva Peckham & Peckham, 1896

Species
- 13, see text

= Chapoda =

Genus of spiders

Chapoda is a genus of jumping spiders that was first described by George Peckham & Elizabeth Peckham in 1896.

== Species ==
As of June 2019 it contains thirteen species, found in Central America, Colombia, Brazil, Ecuador, and Mexico:

- Chapoda angusta Zhang & Maddison, 2012 – Ecuador
- Chapoda festiva Peckham & Peckham, 1896 (type) – Guatemala, Panama, Brazil
- Chapoda fortuna Zhang & Maddison, 2012 – Panama
- Chapoda gaitana Galvis, 2016 – Colombia
- Chapoda gitae Zhang & Maddison, 2012 – Colombia, Ecuador
- Chapoda inermis (F. O. Pickard-Cambridge, 1901) – Mexico to Panama
- Chapoda maxillosa (F. O. Pickard-Cambridge, 1901) – Guatemala, El Salvador, Nicaragua
- Chapoda montana (Chickering, 1946) – Panama
- Chapoda panamana Chickering, 1946 – Panama, Colombia
- Chapoda peckhami Banks, 1929 – Panama
- Chapoda recondita (Peckham & Peckham, 1896) – Guatemala, Panama
- Chapoda sanlorenzo Galvis, 2016 – Colombia
- Chapoda suaita Galvis, 2016 – Colombia
