= Chalcolecta =

Scientific classification
- Kingdom: Animalia
- Phylum: Arthropoda
- Subphylum: Chelicerata
- Class: Arachnida
- Order: Araneae
- Infraorder: Araneomorphae
- Family: Salticidae
- Subfamily: Salticinae
- Genus: Chalcolecta; Simon, 1884

Diversity
- 3 species

Genus of jumping spiders

Chalcolecta is a spider genus of the jumping spider family, Salticidae.

This genus is close to Diolenius.

== Species ==
As of April 2017, the World Spider Catalog accepted the following species:

- Chalcolecta bitaeniata Simon, 1884 – Moluccas, Sulawesi
- Chalcolecta dimidiata Simon, 1884 – Moluccas
- Chalcolecta prensitans (Thorell, 1881) – New Guinea, Queensland

Salticus amplectens Doleschall, 1859 and Salticus zostifera Doleschall, 1859 were included in Chalcolecta by Joanna Gardzińska and Marek Żabka in 2005, as nomina dubia (doubtful names), since the original type specimens have been lost. As of April 2017, the World Spider Catalog agreed on the status of nomina dubia, but considered the placement in Chalcolecta as an error ("lapsus").
