= Baviola =

Scientific classification
- Kingdom: Animalia
- Phylum: Arthropoda
- Subphylum: Chelicerata
- Class: Arachnida
- Order: Araneae
- Infraorder: Araneomorphae
- Family: Salticidae
- Subfamily: Salticinae
- Genus: Baviola; Simon, 1898

Type species
- B. braueri Simon, 1898

Species
- B. braueri Simon, 1898 – Seychelles; B. luteosignata Wanless, 1984 – Seychelles; B. vanmoli Wanless, 1984 – Seychelles

Genus of spiders

Baviola is a genus of Seychelloise jumping spiders that was first described by Eugène Louis Simon in 1898. As of June 2019 it contains only three species, found only on the Seychelles: B. braueri, B. luteosignata, and B. vanmoli.
