= Magyarus =

Scientific classification
- Kingdom: Animalia
- Phylum: Arthropoda
- Subphylum: Chelicerata
- Class: Arachnida
- Order: Araneae
- Infraorder: Araneomorphae
- Family: Salticidae
- Genus: Magyarus; Zabka, 1985
- Species: M. typicus

Binomial name
- Magyarus typicus Zabka, 1985

Genus of spiders

Magyarus is a monotypic genus of Vietnamese jumping spiders containing the single species, Magyarus typicus. It was first described by Marek Michał Żabka in 1985, and is only found in Vietnam.

The cephalothorax is brown, with darker shading around the eyes. The legs are grey-orange with brown spines; the first pair is orange-brown and lighter inside. Males are 4 millimetres (0.16 in) long, and their pedipalps are similar to those of Phlegra. The name is derived from the Hungarian word for Hungary, "Magyar".
