= Parasaitis =

Scientific classification
- Kingdom: Animalia
- Phylum: Arthropoda
- Subphylum: Chelicerata
- Class: Arachnida
- Order: Araneae
- Infraorder: Araneomorphae
- Family: Salticidae
- Genus: Parasaitis; Bryant, 1950
- Species: P. femoralis

Binomial name
- Parasaitis femoralis Bryant, 1950

Genus of spiders

Parasaitis is a monotypic genus of jumping spiders containing the single species, Parasaitis femoralis. It was first described by E. B. Bryant in 1950, and is only found on the Greater Antilles. The name is a combination of the Ancient Greek "para" (παρά), meaning "alongside", and the salticid genus Saitis.
