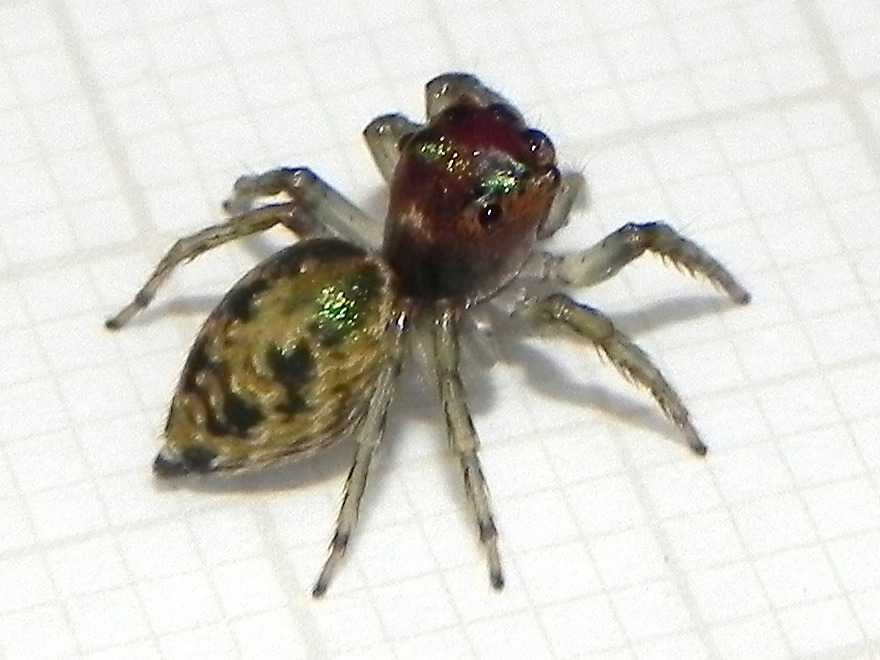
- Female Sidusa angulitarsis

Scientific classification
- Kingdom: Animalia
- Phylum: Arthropoda
- Subphylum: Chelicerata
- Class: Arachnida
- Order: Araneae
- Infraorder: Araneomorphae
- Family: Salticidae
- Subfamily: Salticinae
- Genus: Sidusa; G. W. Peckham & E. G. Peckham, 1895

Type species
- S. gratiosa G. W. Peckham & E. G. Peckham, 1895

Species
- 26, see text

Synonyms
- Chloridusa Simon, 1902

= Sidusa =

Genus of spiders

Sidusa is a genus of jumping spiders that was first described by George and Elizabeth Peckham in 1895.

== Species ==
As of February 2022 it contains twenty-six species, found in Central America, South America, the Caribbean, Mexico, and on Borneo:

- Sidusa albopalpis (G. W. Peckham & E. G. Peckham, 1901) – Jamaica
- Sidusa angulitarsis Simon, 1902 – Brazil
- Sidusa beebei (Petrunkevitch, 1914) – Borneo
- Sidusa carinata Kraus, 1955 – El Salvador
- Sidusa dominicana Petrunkevitch, 1914 – Dominican Rep.
- Sidusa erythrocras (Chamberlin & Ivie, 1936) – Panama
- Sidusa femoralis Banks, 1909 – Costa Rica
- Sidusa flavens (G. W. Peckham & E. G. Peckham, 1896) – Panama
- Sidusa gratiosa G. W. Peckham & E. G. Peckham, 1895 (type) – Brazil
- Sidusa guianensis (Caporiacco, 1947) – Guyana
- Sidusa inconspicua Bryant, 1940 – Cuba
- Sidusa incurva (Chickering, 1946) – Panama
- Sidusa marmorea F. O. Pickard-Cambridge, 1901 – Costa Rica, Panama
- Sidusa nigrina F. O. Pickard-Cambridge, 1901 – Mexico
- Sidusa obscura (Chickering, 1946) – Panama
- Sidusa olivacea F. O. Pickard-Cambridge, 1901 – Guatemala
- Sidusa pallida F. O. Pickard-Cambridge, 1901 – Guatemala
- Sidusa perdita (Banks, 1898) – Mexico
- Sidusa scintillans (Crane, 1943) – Venezuela
- Sidusa seclusa (Chickering, 1946) – Panama
- Sidusa stoneri Bryant, 1923 – Antigua and Barbuda (Antigua)
- Sidusa subfusca (F. O. Pickard-Cambridge, 1900) – Costa Rica, Panama
- Sidusa tarsalis Banks, 1909 – Costa Rica
- Sidusa turquinensis Bryant, 1940 – Cuba
- Sidusa unica Kraus, 1955 – El Salvador
- Sidusa viridiaurea (Simon, 1902) – Peru, Brazil
