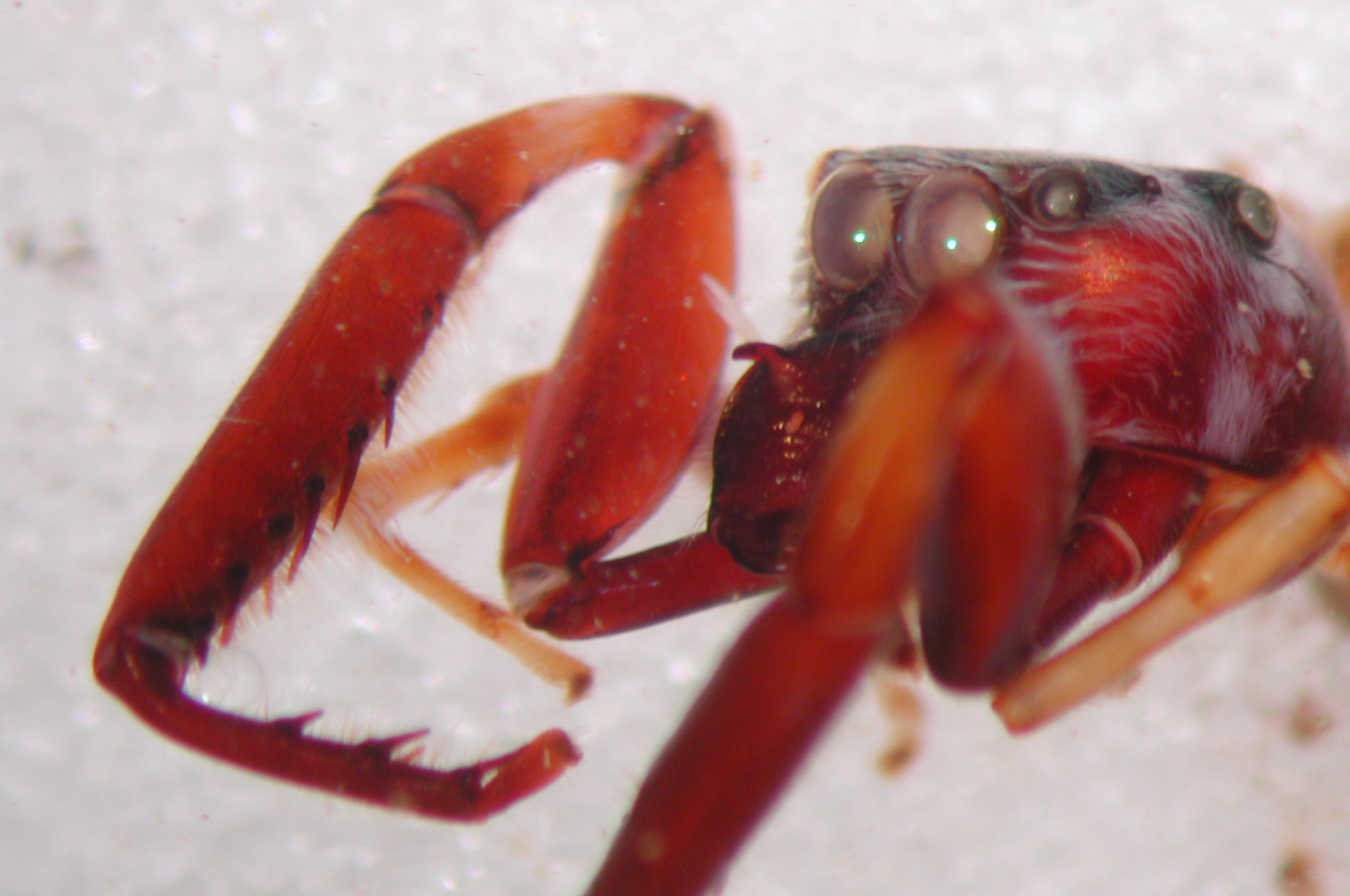
- in vitro male U. elegans

Scientific classification
- Kingdom: Animalia
- Phylum: Arthropoda
- Subphylum: Chelicerata
- Class: Arachnida
- Order: Araneae
- Infraorder: Araneomorphae
- Family: Salticidae
- Genus: Udvardya
- Species: U. elegans

Binomial name
- Udvardya elegans (Szombathy, 1915)

Synonyms
- Silerella elegans Siler elegans

= Udvardya =

Genus of spiders

Udvardya is a genus of jumping spider endemic to New Guinea. As of 2017, it contains only one species, Udvardya elegans.

Males and females are similar in appearance. There are minor differences in the abdominal pattern, and males have small curved "horns" on their chelicerae. In both sexes, the first pair of legs are greatly enlarged.

== Behavior ==
Nothing is known about the biology of this species, as it is only known from dead specimens.

== Name ==
The genus name is derived from the Hungarian biologist Miklos Udvardy; elegans is Latin for "elegant".
