= Bulolia =

Scientific classification
- Kingdom: Animalia
- Phylum: Arthropoda
- Subphylum: Chelicerata
- Class: Arachnida
- Order: Araneae
- Infraorder: Araneomorphae
- Family: Salticidae
- Subfamily: Salticinae
- Genus: Bulolia; Zabka, 1996

Type species
- B. ocellata Zabka, 1996

Species
- B. excentrica Zabka, 1996 – New Guinea; B. ocellata Zabka, 1996 – New Guinea

Genus of spiders

Bulolia is a genus of Papuan jumping spiders that was first described by Marek Michał Żabka in 1996. As of June 2019 it contains only two species, found only in Papua New Guinea: B. excentrica and B. ocellata.
