= Tarodes =

Scientific classification
- Kingdom: Animalia
- Phylum: Arthropoda
- Subphylum: Chelicerata
- Class: Arachnida
- Order: Araneae
- Infraorder: Araneomorphae
- Family: Salticidae
- Genus: Tarodes; Pocock, 1899
- Species: T. lineatus

Binomial name
- Tarodes lineatus Pocock, 1899

Genus of spiders

Tarodes is a monotypic genus of jumping spiders containing the single species, Tarodes lineatus. It was first described by Reginald Innes Pocock in 1899, and is found only on the Bismarck Archipelago of New Britain. The species name lineatus means "striped" in Latin.
