= Chalcolemia =

Scientific classification
- Kingdom: Animalia
- Phylum: Arthropoda
- Subphylum: Chelicerata
- Class: Arachnida
- Order: Araneae
- Infraorder: Araneomorphae
- Family: Salticidae
- Genus: Chalcolemia; Zhang & Maddison, 2012
- Species: C. nakanai

Binomial name
- Chalcolemia nakanai Zhang & Maddison, 2012

Genus of spiders

Chalcolemia is a monotypic genus of jumping spiders containing the single species, Chalcolemia nakanai. It was first described by J. X. Zhang & Wayne Paul Maddison in 2012, and is only found on New Britain.
