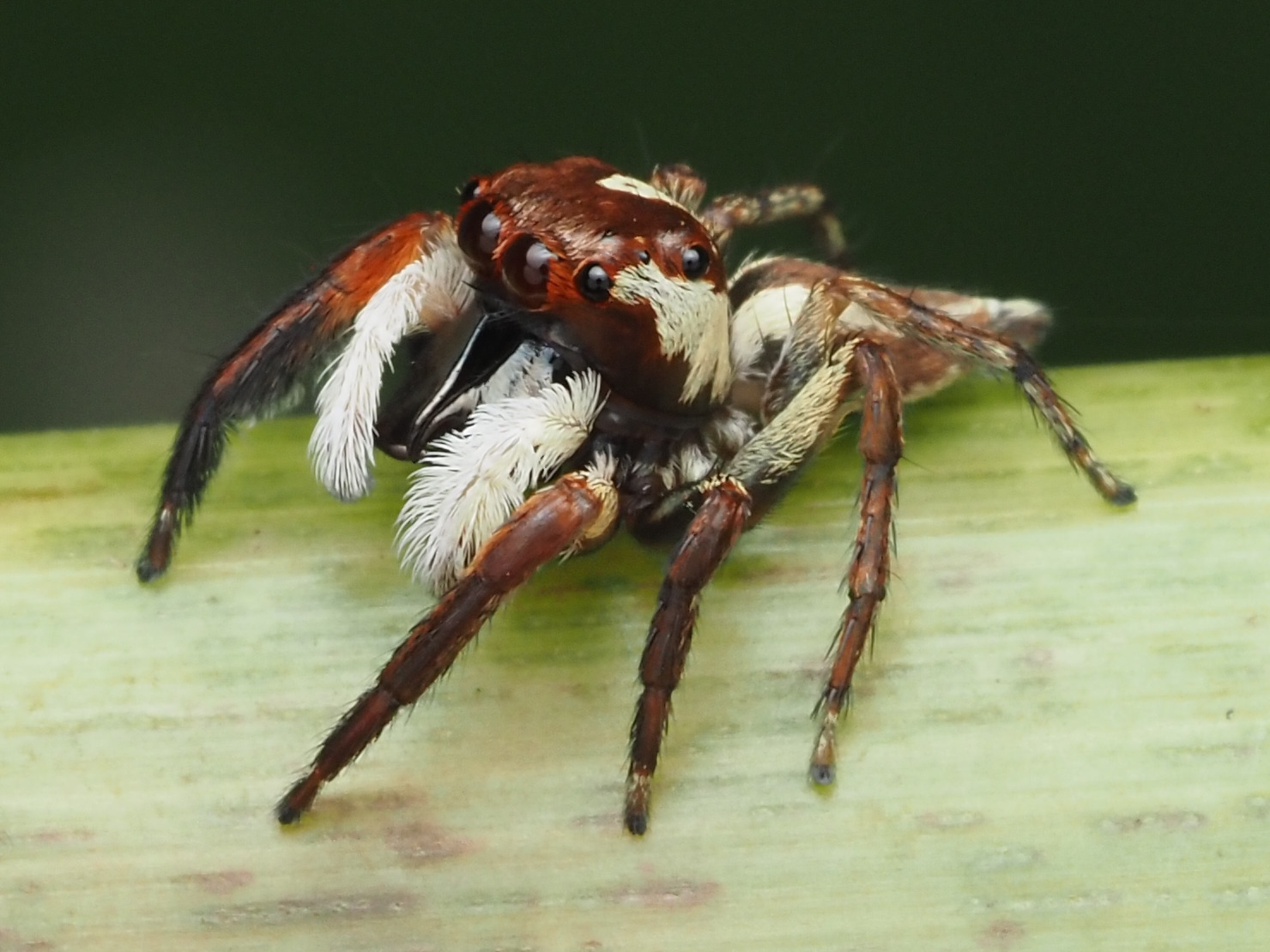
- Male Pensacola signata in Belize

Scientific classification
- Kingdom: Animalia
- Phylum: Arthropoda
- Subphylum: Chelicerata
- Class: Arachnida
- Order: Araneae
- Infraorder: Araneomorphae
- Family: Salticidae
- Subfamily: Salticinae
- Genus: Pensacola; Peckham & Peckham, 1885

Type species
- P. signata Peckham & Peckham, 1885

Species
- 9, see text

= Pensacola (spider) =

Genus of spiders

Pensacola is a genus of jumping spiders that was first described by George and Elizabeth Peckham in 1885.

== Species ==
As of August 2019 it contains nine species, found in Central America, Venezuela, Guyana, Ecuador, Brazil, and Mexico:

- Pensacola castanea Simon, 1902 – Brazil
- Pensacola cyaneochirus Simon, 1902 – Ecuador
- Pensacola gaujoni Simon, 1902 – Ecuador
- Pensacola murina Simon, 1902 – Brazil, Guyana
- Pensacola ornata Simon, 1902 – Brazil
- Pensacola poecilocilia Caporiacco, 1955 – Venezuela
- Pensacola radians (Peckham & Peckham, 1896) – Panama
- Pensacola signata Peckham & Peckham, 1885 (type) – Guatemala
- Pensacola sylvestris (Peckham & Peckham, 1896) – Mexico, Guatemala
