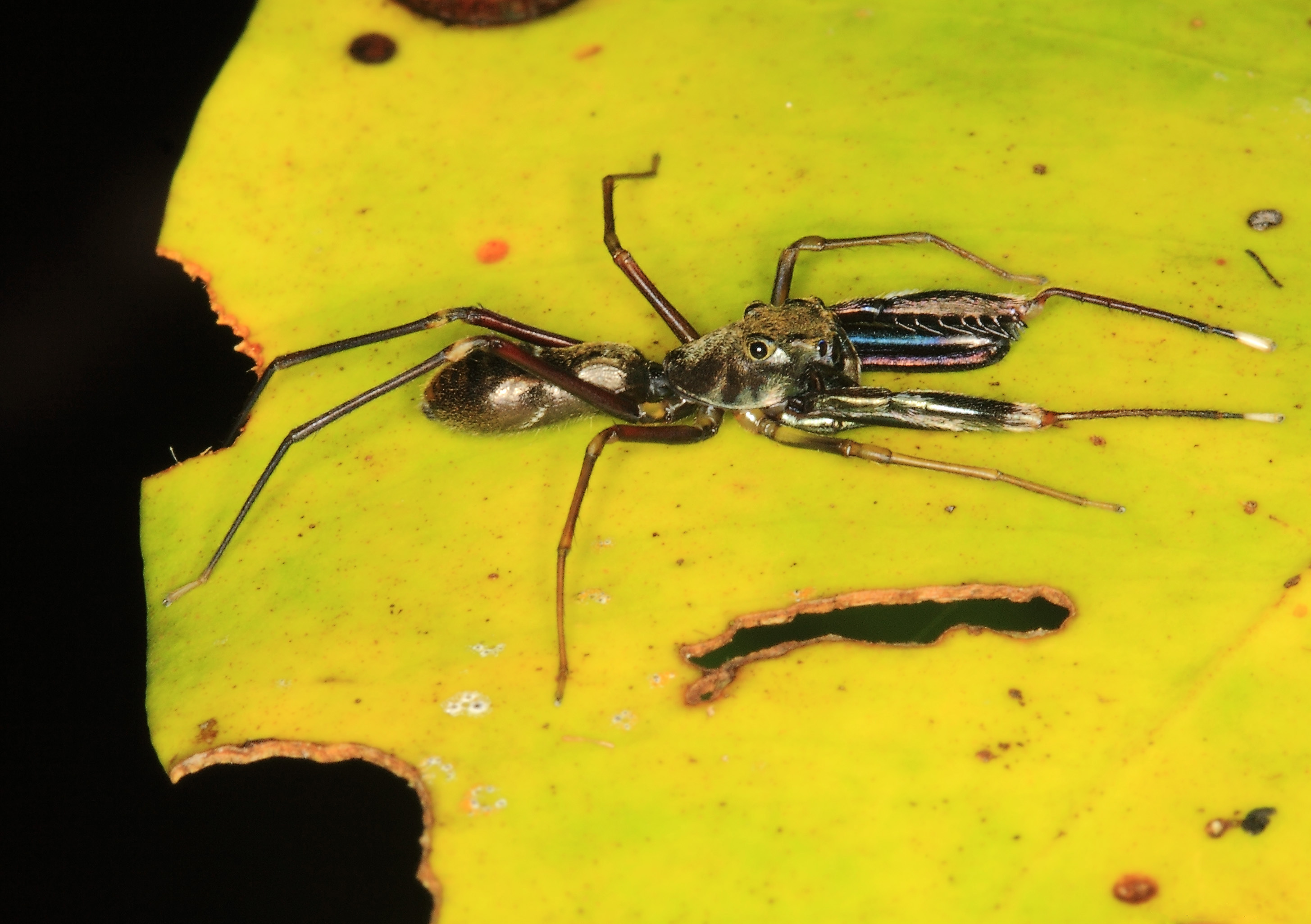
- Male Diolenius phrynoides

Scientific classification
- Kingdom: Animalia
- Phylum: Arthropoda
- Subphylum: Chelicerata
- Class: Arachnida
- Order: Araneae
- Infraorder: Araneomorphae
- Family: Salticidae
- Subfamily: Salticinae
- Genus: Diolenius; Thorell, 1870

Type species
- D. phrynoides (Walckenaer, 1837)

Species
- 16, see text

= Diolenius =

Genus of spiders

Diolenius is a genus of jumping spiders that was first described by Tamerlan Thorell in 1870.

== Species ==
As of June 2019 it contains sixteen species, found only in Indonesian New Guinea (provinces of Papua and West Papua), Papua New Guinea and on the Moluccas:

- Diolenius albopiceus Hogg, 1915 – New Guinea
- Diolenius amplectens Thorell, 1881 – New Guinea
- Diolenius angustipes Gardzińska & Zabka, 2006 – Indonesia (Biak Is.)
- Diolenius armatissimus Thorell, 1881 – Indonesia (Moluccas), New Guinea
- Diolenius bicinctus Simon, 1884 – Indonesia (Moluccas), New Guinea
- Diolenius decorus Gardzińska & Zabka, 2006 – New Guinea
- Diolenius infulatus Gardzińska & Zabka, 2006 – New Guinea, Papua New Guinea (New Britain)
- Diolenius insignitus Gardzińska & Zabka, 2006 – Indonesia (Moluccas)
- Diolenius lineatus Gardzińska & Zabka, 2006 – New Guinea
- Diolenius lugubris Thorell, 1881 – New Guinea, Papua New Guinea (New Britain)
- Diolenius paradoxus Gardzińska & Zabka, 2006 – New Guinea
- Diolenius phrynoides (Walckenaer, 1837) (type) – Indonesia (Ambon, New Guinea)
- Diolenius redimiculatus Gardzińska & Zabka, 2006 – New Guinea
- Diolenius sarmiensis Gardzińska & Patoleta, 2013 – New Guinea
- Diolenius varicus Gardzińska & Zabka, 2006 – New Guinea
- Diolenius virgatus Gardzińska & Zabka, 2006 – New Guinea
