= Joanna Gardzińska =

Polish arachnologist

- Education: Jagiellonian University, Krakow; Siedlce University of Natural Sciences and Humanities
- Scientific career
- Fields: Arachnology
- Workplaces: Siedlce University of Natural Sciences and Humanities
- Author abbrev. (zoology): Gardzińska

Joanna Gardzińska is a Polish arachnologist.

She graduated in 1994 from the Jagiellonian University, Krakow. From 1995, she has been employed in the Department of Zoology at what is now the Siedlce University of Natural Sciences and Humanities, Poland. She gained her PhD from there in 2004 when the institution had a different title (Akademia Podlaska).

Her research interests are in the taxonomy and biogeography of Salticidae (jumping spiders), particularly of the Australian and Oriental Regions. As of April 2017, the World Spider Catalog listed one genus name and 26 species names or synonyms of which she is either a co-author or the sole author.
