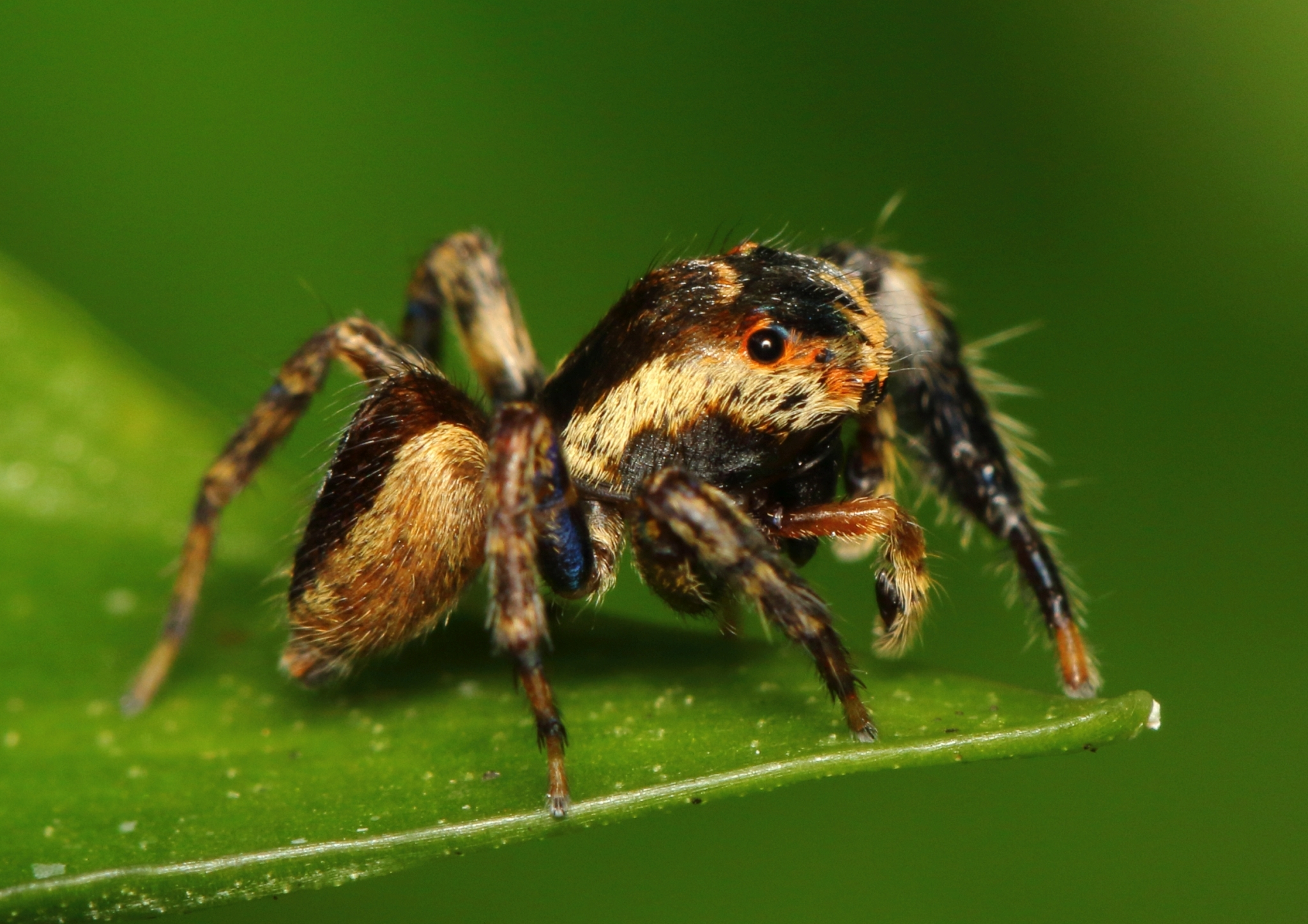
- Male Thyenula haddadi found near Pietermaritzburg
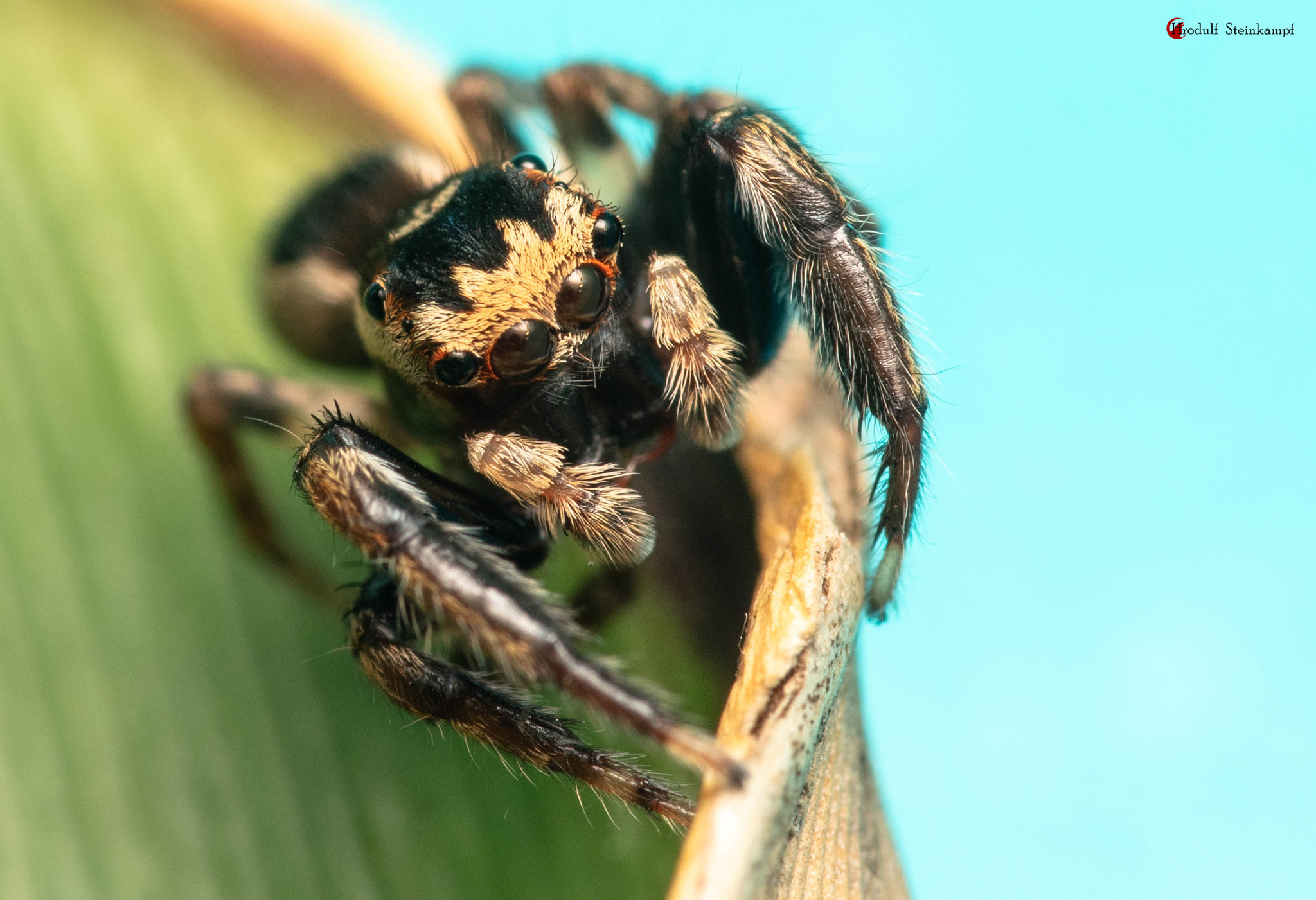
- A mature specimen found near Dududu

Scientific classification
- Kingdom: Animalia
- Phylum: Arthropoda
- Subphylum: Chelicerata
- Class: Arachnida
- Order: Araneae
- Infraorder: Araneomorphae
- Family: Salticidae
- Genus: Thyenula
- Species: T. haddadi

Binomial name
- Thyenula haddadi Wesołowska, Azarkina & Russell-Smith, 2014

= Thyenula haddadi =

Species of jumping spider

Thyenula haddadi is a jumping spider species that lives in South Africa. A member of the genus Thyenula, the spider is medium-sized to large, measuring between 3.8 and 5.8 mm (0.15 and 0.23 in) in total body length. It has been found living on pine trees. The spider is generally brown on its upper surfaces, apart from the female's abdomen, which is mainly greyish-beige, and the sides of the lighter streaks on the male's abdomen. Underneath, i|t is generally lighter than the upper surfaces with some dark markings or patches. It can be distinguished from related species like Thyenula leighi by the presence of a white V-shaped marking and oblique streaks between the spider's eyes. The male has generally yellowish to brown legs; the female's legs are light brown. The spider's copulatory organs are distinctive, including the male's long curled embolus and the presence of flanges on the edges of a depression that can be seen towards the front of the female's epigyne.

== Etymology and taxonomy ==
Thyenula haddadi is a species of jumping spider, a member of the family Salticidae, that was first described by the arachnologists Wanda Wesołowska, Galina Azarkina and Anthony Russell-Smith in 2014. They allocated it to the genus Thyenula, which had been itself been first circumscribed by the naturalist Eugène Simon in 1902. The spider was one of over 500 species identified by Wesołowska during her career, only Simon having described more. It is named after the South African arachnologist Charles R. Haddad.

In 2015, the evolutionary biologist Wayne Maddison undertook a phylogenetic classification that showed that the genus is a member of tribe Euophryini. First circumscribed by Simon in 1901, the tribe has also been known as Euophrydinae, but the original name is now more prevalent. It is a member of the clade Saltafresia. The genus was part of a proposed clade named after it alongside the related genus Rumburak. In 2017, the arachnologist Jerzy Prószyński added the genus to a group of genera named Euopherines.

== Description ==
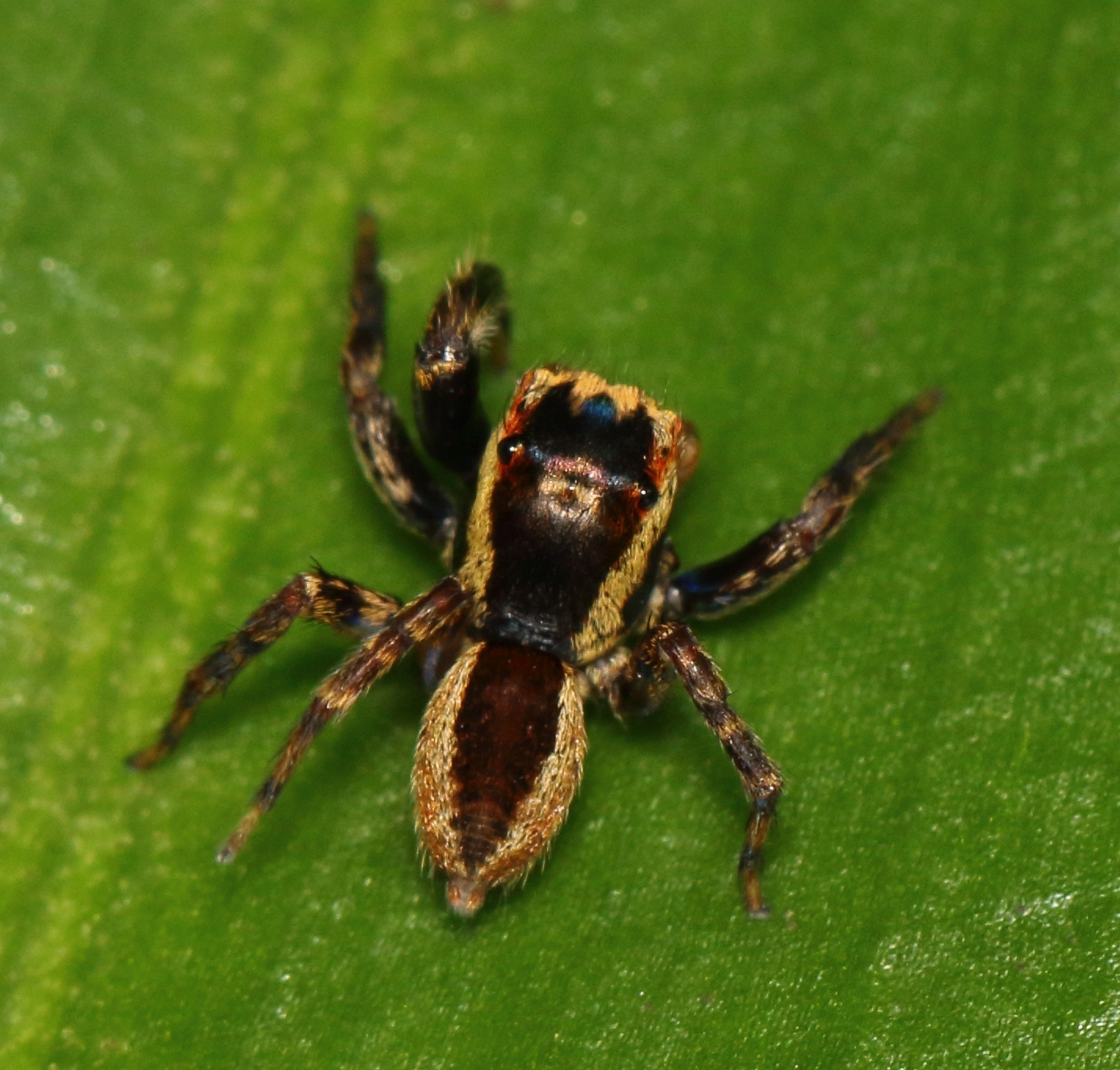
Another view of a male of the species

Thyenula are medium-sized to large spiders. They have a body that is divided into two main parts: a rounded cephalothorax, behind that, and a more bulbous abdomen. The male Thyenula haddadi has a moderately high, with a gentle sloping rear, cephalothorax that is between 1.9 and 3.1 mm (0.07 and 0.12 in) long and 1.5 and 2.3 mm (0.06 and 0.09 in). Its carapace, the hard upper part of the cephalothorax, is brown with a darker eye field that has a marking of two oblique short streaks made of white hairs and a v-shape between its eyes. This pattern is one way of telling the species from related species like Thyenula leighi. There are white streaks on its sides and, in some examples, two small rounded patches on a depression on its upper surface, its fovea. The part of the underside of the carapace known as the sternum is brownish orange. Its chelicerae has two teeth at its front margins and one more behind. Its remaining mouthparts, including its labium and maxillae, are also brown but have paler tips.

Behind its cephalothorax, the male has an ovoid abdomen that is between 1.9 and 2.7 mm (0.07 and 0.11 in) long and between 1.5 and 2 mm (0.06 and 0.08 in) wide. Its topside is lighter than its carapace, particularly in yellowish sides that are broken with small dark irregular patches. Running down the middle of its abdomen, the spider has a wide brown streak, sometimes broken to the rear by chevrons. Underneath, the abdomen is light with some dark markings. Some specimens are darker and have a broad median brown stripe. The spider has yellowish-grey spinnerets that it uses to spin webs. Its legs are generally yellowish to brown with broad dark rings on some of its segments. The first pair of legs have long dense blackish hairs.

Its pedipalps, sensor organs near its mouth, are orange with slightly darker sections. At the end of a pedipalp is the male's spider's copulatory organs. Its palpal tibia has a bump on its sides and a large spike, or tibial apophysis that has a broken end. The apophysis runs next to its hairy cymbium, to which is attached a rounded palpal bulb that has a lump at the bottom and a long embolus that starts near the top that curls around more than once and sticks out alongside the cymbium.

Superficially, the female is had to distinguish from the male. Its cephalothorax is similar in size to the male, measuring between 2.5 and 2.6 mm (0.10 and 0.10 in) in length and between 1.7 and 2 mm (0.07 and 0.08 in) in width, and an abdomen is generally smaller, between 2 and 2.2 mm (0.08 and 0.09 in) in length and between 2 and 2.7 mm (0.08 and 0.11 in) in width. Its carapace is brown, covered in brown hairs and bristles, with a slightly darker eye field. There are fawn scales near its front-most eyes. The part of the spider's face, known as the clypeus, is low and light brown. The top of its abdomen is mainly greyish-beige and covered in thin shiny hairs. There is a pattern of small light patches and chevrons on the top. Underneath, there are small darker patches on its otherwise light surface. Its legs are light brown and have brown hairs.

The female's epigyne, the visible external part of its copulatory organs, is oval and has a large anterior depression that is edged with flanges that show slight signs of sclerotization. There are two copulatory openings that lead to short seminal ducts to large bean-shaped spermathecae, or receptacles. There are small accessory glands visible across the ducts. These organs are similar to Thyenula clarosignata apart from the way that the depression in its epigyne is nearer the front than in the other species. More clearly, the species are clearly told apart by the presence of a stripe on its abdomen.

== Distribution and habitat ==
Although Thyenula spiders can be found across Southern Africa,Thyenula haddadi is endemic to South Africa. The species has only been found in Pietermaritzburg in KwaZulu-Natal. It has been seen living on the bark of pine trees.
