= Thyenula montana =

Scientific classification
- Kingdom: Animalia
- Phylum: Arthropoda
- Subphylum: Chelicerata
- Class: Arachnida
- Order: Araneae
- Infraorder: Araneomorphae
- Family: Salticidae
- Genus: Thyenula
- Species: T. montana

Binomial name
- Thyenula montana Wesołowska, Azarkina & Russell-Smith, 2014

Species of jumping spider

Thyenula montana is a jumping spider species that lives in Lesotho. A member of the genus Thyenula, the spider has a typical body length of between 3.6 mm (0.14 in). It has been found living amongst rocks an altitude of 3,070 m (10,070 ft) above sea level. It is its preference for mountainous environments that gives the spider its specific name. The spider has a distinctive pattern of two white stripes on the upper surfaces of its forward sections, or carapace. This helps to distinguish the spider from most the others in the genus. Another way of comparing them is to look at the spiders’ copulatory organs.. The male Thyenula montana has a relatively short embolus. The female has not been described.

== Etymology and taxonomy ==
Thyenula montana is a species of jumping spider, a member of the family Salticidae, that was first described by the arachnologists Wanda Wesołowska, Galina Azarkina and Anthony Russell-Smith in 2014. They allocated it to the genus Thyenula, which had been itself been first circumscribed by the naturalist Eugène Simon in 1902. The spider was one of over 500 species identified by Wesołowska during her career, only Simon having described more. Its specific name is related to a Latin word that can be translated 'mountain' and recalls the mountainous environment where the spider is found.

In 2015, the evolutionary biologist Wayne Maddison undertook a phylogenetic classification that showed that the genus is a member of tribe Euophryini. First circumscribed by Simon in 1901, the tribe has also been known as Euophrydinae, but the original name is now more prevalent. It is a member of the clade Saltafresia. The genus was part of a proposed clade named after it alongside the related genus Rumburak. In 2017, the arachnologist Jerzy Prószyński added the genus to a group of genera named Euopherines.

== Description ==
Thyenula are medium-sized to large spiders. They have a body that is divided into two main parts: an oval cephalothorax, behind that, and a thinner abdomen. The male Thyenula montana has an oval cephalothorax that is typically 18 mm (0.71 in) long and 1.2 mm (0.05 in) wide. Its carapace, the hard upper part of the cephalothorax, is moderately high, brown and marked with a covering of brown hairs. It has a black eye field and a marking of two white bands that extend from its eyes to the back of its carapace and a line of white hairs at the front of its eye field. There are long brown bristles around the spider’s foremost eyes. The sides of its carapace are yellowish and have a thin brown line running along its edges. The part of the underside of the spider's cephalothorax known as its sternum is yellow. The spider's face, or clypeus, is covered in white hairs. Its jaws, or chelicerae, and its remaining mouthparts, including its labium and maxillae, are yellow.

Behind its cephalothorax, the male has an oval abdomen that is similar in size to its carapace. Its topside is brown and hairy and is marked with a lighter greyish-fawn band across its middle.. Its sides are marked with white streaks. In some cases, the spider’s sides also have darker markings. Underneath, the abdomen is yellowish. The spider’s legs are generally yellow with brown leg hairs and long light brown spines.

Its pedipalps, sensor organs near its mouth, are yellow and have a covering of dense brown hairs. At the end of its pedipalp is the male's spider's copulatory organs. Its palpal tibia has a large spike, or tibial apophysis, that is wider at its base and has a kink at the end. The apophysis runs next to its hairy cymbium, to which is attached a rounded palpal bulb that has a long embolus that starts towards the middle and curls around once before it sticks out towards the top of the bulb. At the bottom of the bulb is a large bulge. The female has not been described.

The spider can be distinguished from others in the genus, apart from ‘’Thyunela virgulata’ by its stripy carapace. Compared to that species, the spider by the other species longer embolus.

== Distribution and habitat ==
Although Thyenula spiders can be found across Southern Africa,Thyenula montana is endemic to Lesotho. The species has be found living amongst rocks at an altitude of 3,070 m (10,070 ft) above sea level. It lives in the grassland found on mountains in the area.
