= Thyenula cheliceroides =

- Male from Kwa-Zulu Natal

Scientific classification
- Kingdom: Animalia
- Phylum: Arthropoda
- Subphylum: Chelicerata
- Class: Arachnida
- Order: Araneae
- Infraorder: Araneomorphae
- Family: Salticidae
- Genus: Thyenula
- Species: T. cheliceroides

Binomial name
- Thyenula cheliceroides Wesołowska, Azarkina & Russell-Smith, 2014

Species of jumping spider

Thyenula cheliceroides is a jumping spider species that lives in South Africa. Amongst the largest members of the genus Thyenula, the spider is typically 10.8 mm (0.43 in) in total body length. The spider is dark brown, nearly black, with faint light patches towards the middle of its upper sections. There are long bristles near the front row of the spider's eyes. The male has longer brown front legs, the remainder being shorter and less stout. The male spider has large jaws, or chelicerae, which is recalled in the spider's specific name. The female has not been described.

== Etymology and taxonomy ==
Thyenula cheliceroides is a species of jumping spider, a member of the family Salticidae, that was first described by the arachnologists Wanda Wesołowska, Galina Azarkina and Anthony Russell-Smith in 2014. They allocated it to the genus Thyenula, which had been itself been first circumscribed by the naturalist Eugène Simon in 1902. The spider was one of over 500 species identified by Wesołowska during her career, only Simon having described more. Its specific name is related to the spider's large jaws, or chelicerae.

In 2015, the evolutionary biologist Wayne Maddison undertook a phylogenetic classification that showed that the genus is a member of tribe Euophryini. First circumscribed by Simon in 1901, the tribe was subsequently also been known as Euophrydinae, but the original name is now more prevalent. It is a member of the clade Saltafresia. The genus was part of a proposed clade named after it alongside the related genus Rumburak. In 2017, the arachnologist Jerzy Prószyński added the genus to a group of genera named Euopherines.

== Description ==
Thyenula are medium-sized to large spiders. They have a body that is divided into two main parts: an oval cephalothorax, behind that, and a thinner abdomen. Thyenula cheliceroides are amongst the largest in the genus. The male has a cephalothorax that is typically 5.3 mm (0.21 in) long and 3.4 mm (0.13 in) wide. Its oval carapace, the hard upper part of the cephalothorax, is very dark, almost black, although its central fovea is lighter, and covered in brown hairs. There are long bristles near the front row of the spider's eyes. The part of the underside of the spider's carapace known as its sternum is also dark. The spider's face, or clypeus, is very low and dark. Its dark brown chelicerae are very large and robust, two small teeth to its front margins and one very broad tooth behind. Its remaining mouthparts, including its labium and maxillae, are brown with whitish tips.

Behind its cephalothorax, the male has an oval abdomen that is typically 5.6 mm (0.22 in) long and between 3.3 mm (0.13 in) wide. It is dark like its carapace apart from a faint lighter streak in the middle. It is densely covered in golden fawn hairs. Its legs are also dark brown, its front legs being longer and stouter than the others. They are densely covered in long black hairs.

Its pedipalps, sensor organs near its mouth, are relatively small, dark and densely covered in long brown hairs. At the end of its hairy pedipalp is the male's spider's copulatory organs. Its palpal tibia has a large spike, or tibial apophysis, that has a small bend at the end. The apophysis runs next to its hairy cymbium, to which is attached a rounded palpal bulb that has a long embolus that starts towards the middle and curls around more than once before it sticks out towards the top of the bulb . The female has not been described.

== Distribution and habitat ==
Although Thyenula spiders can be found across Southern Africa,Thyenula cheliceroides is endemic to South Africa. The species was first seen in Vernon Crookes Nature Reserve in KwaZulu-Natal. It has been seen living in leaf litter found in afromontane forests.
