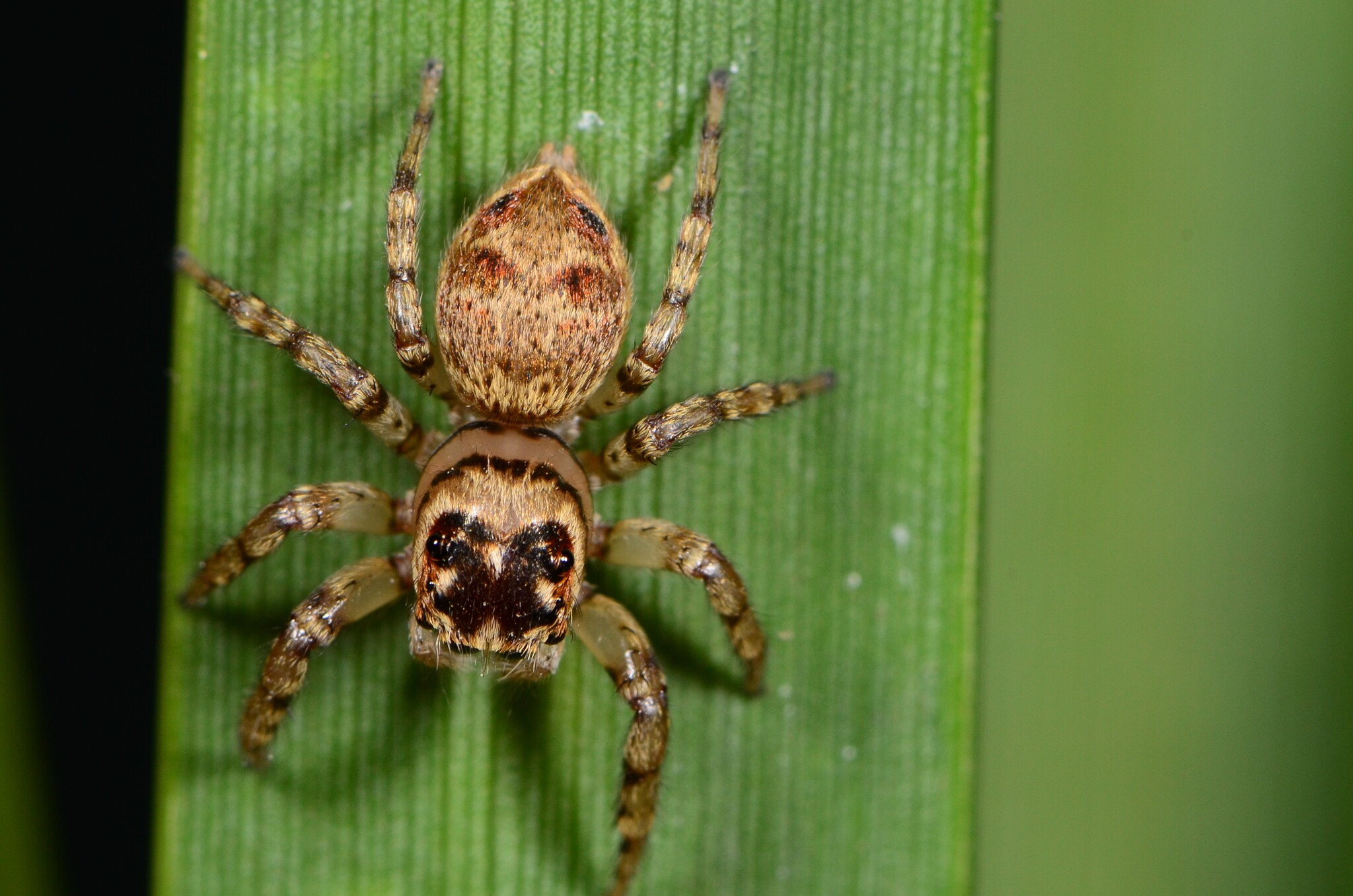
- female
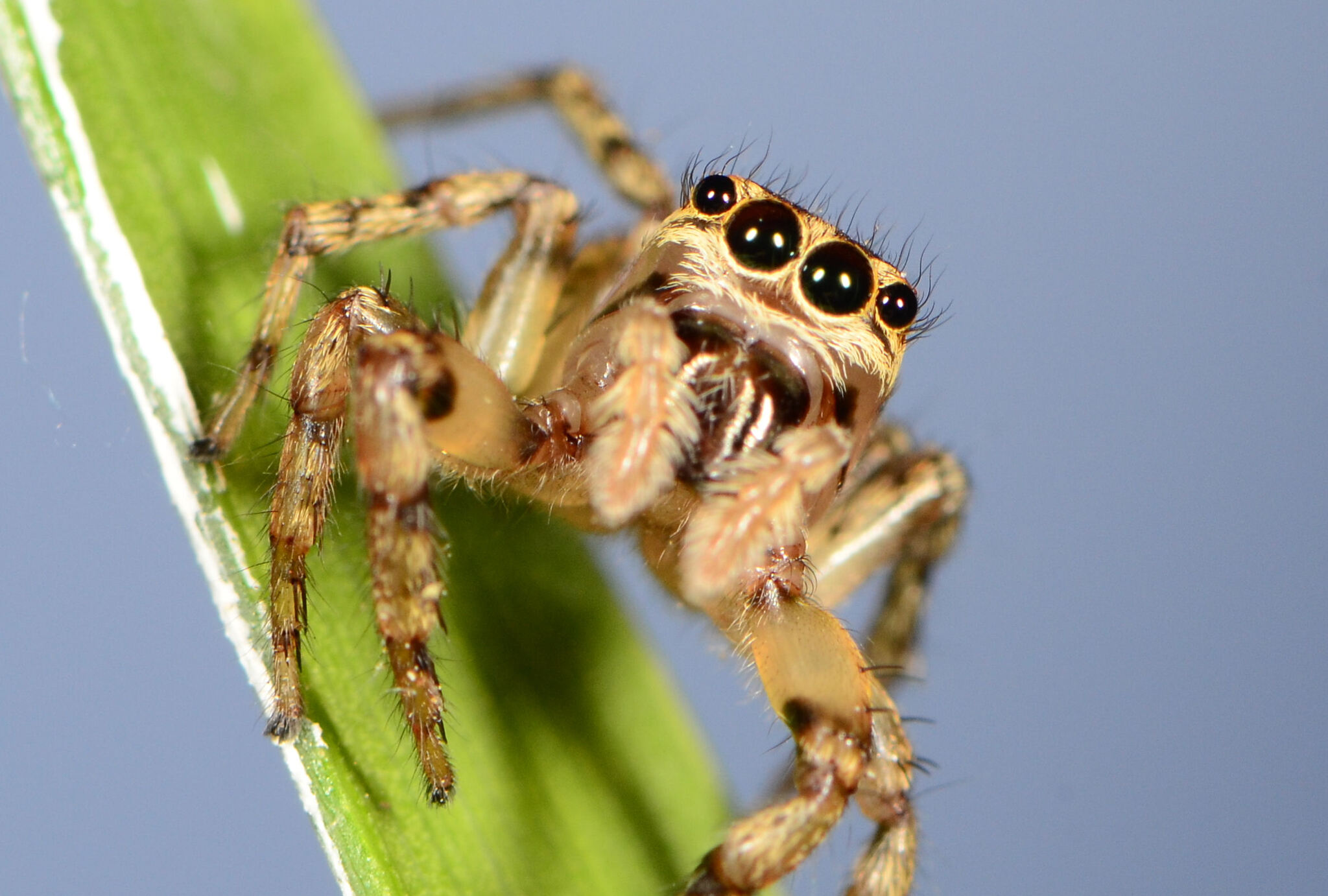
- female

Scientific classification
- Kingdom: Animalia
- Phylum: Arthropoda
- Subphylum: Chelicerata
- Class: Arachnida
- Order: Araneae
- Infraorder: Araneomorphae
- Family: Salticidae
- Genus: Thyenula
- Species: T. rufa

Binomial name
- Thyenula rufa Wesołowska, Azarkina & Russell-Smith, 2014

= Thyenula rufa =

Species of jumping spider

Thyenula rufa is a jumping spider species that lives in South Africa. A member of the genus Thyenula, it is a large spider measuring between 7 and 10 mm (0.28 and 0.39 in) in total body length, the male being generally larger than the female. It has been found living on coastal forests. The spider has distinctive copper-coloured hairs on its body, which is referred to in its specific name, the Latin word for 'red headed'. Its carapace, the hard upper part of the front section of the spider, is a orange-brownish oval. Its rear section, or abdomen, varies between specimens. Males are generally grey-ish brown with a stripe visible running across the middle. Females are generally yellowish-brown with some having a marking of brown patches on them. All have generally yellowish-brown legs.

== Etymology and taxonomy ==
Thyenula rufa is a species of jumping spider, a member of the family Salticidae, that was first described by the arachnologists Wanda Wesołowska, Galina Azarkina and Anthony Russell-Smith in 2014. They allocated it to the genus Thyenula, which had been itself been first circumscribed by the naturalist Eugène Simon in 1902. The spider was one of over 500 species identified by Wesołowska during her career, only Simon having described more. Its specific name is the Latin word for 'red headed' and is named for the copper-coloured hairs that are found on its body.

In 2015, the evolutionary biologist Wayne Maddison undertook a phylogenetic classification that showed that the genus is a member of tribe Euophryini. First circumscribed by Simon in 1901, the tribe has also been known as Euophrydinae, but the original name is now more prevalent. It is a member of the clade Saltafresia. The genus was part of a proposed clade named after it alongside the related genus Rumburak. In 2017, the arachnologist Jerzy Prószyński added the genus to a group of genera named Euopherines.

== Description ==
Thyenula are medium-sized to large spiders. They have a body that is divided into two main parts: a rounded cephalothorax, behind that, and a more bulbous abdomen. Thyenula rufa is a large spider. The male has a cephalothorax that is between 4.8 and 5.2 mm (0.19 and 0.20 in) long, 3.6 and 4.2 mm (0.14 and 0.17 in) and 2.4 and 2.6 mm (0.09 and 0.10 in) high. Its carapace, the hard upper part of the cephalothorax, is a orange-brownish oval with a short eye field and a clear depression, or fovea visible in the middle of its [thorax. There are black rings around its eyes. Overall, there are a few hairs on the spiders thorax and a few longer bristles near its eyes. The part of the underside of the carapace known as the sternum is yellow. The spider's face, or clypeus, is low and brown. Its chelicerae are characteristically large and robust with a single teeth at the front margin and one more behind. A large fang is visible. Its remaining mouthparts, including its labium and maxillae, are light brown with cream tips.

Behind its cephalothorax, the male has an ovoid abdomen that is between 4.6 and 4.8 mm (0.18 and 0.19 in) long and between 2.7 and 3.4 mm (0.11 and 0.13 in) wide. Its topside is greyish-brown and covered in reddish-copper coloured hairs that are particularly dense on its sides and front edge. It is marked with a lighter band across the middle and longer bristles scattered across its surface. Underneath, the abdomen is light yellowish, as are its spinnerets that it uses to spin webs. Its legs are generally yellowish-brown with dark brown hairs and spines.

Its pedipalps, sensor organs near its mouth, are smaller than other species in the genus. At the end of a pedipalp is the male's spider's copulatory organs. Its palpal tibia has a large spike, or tibial apophysis that has a slightly bent end. The apophysis runs next to its cymbium, to which is attached a significantly smaller rounded palpal bulb. At the top of the bulb projects a long embolus that curls around and then follows the cymbium.

Superficially, the female is hard to distinguish from the male but it is slightly smaller. Its cephalothorax measures between 3.9 and 4.2 mm (0.15 and 0.17 in) in length, between 3.4 and 3.6 mm (0.13 and 0.14 in) in width and 2 and 2.4 mm (0.08 and 0.09 in) in height. Its chelicerae are similarly robust and have a similarly large bicuspid tooth at the back but two, rather than one, teeth at the front. Its abdomen is similarly covered in reddish hairs but is smaller, between 3.1 and 4.1 mm (0.12 and 0.16 in) in length and between 2.3 and 2.6 mm (0.09 and 0.10 in) in width. It is generally yellowish-brown although sometimes its is marked with a pattern of black patches.

The female's epigyne, the visible external part of its copulatory organs, is oval and has a small depression that shows slight signs of sclerotization. There are two copulatory openings that lead via short insemination ducts to large spermathecae, or receptacles. These organs are similar to Thyenula aurantiaca apart from the length of the insemination ducts and the way that they are wider at the start.

== Distribution and habitat ==
Although Thyenula spiders can be found across Southern Africa. Thyenula rufa is endemic to South Africa. The species has be found in the coastal area along the southeast of the country. It has been seen living in coastal evergreen forests and particularly on Vepris lanceolata trees.
