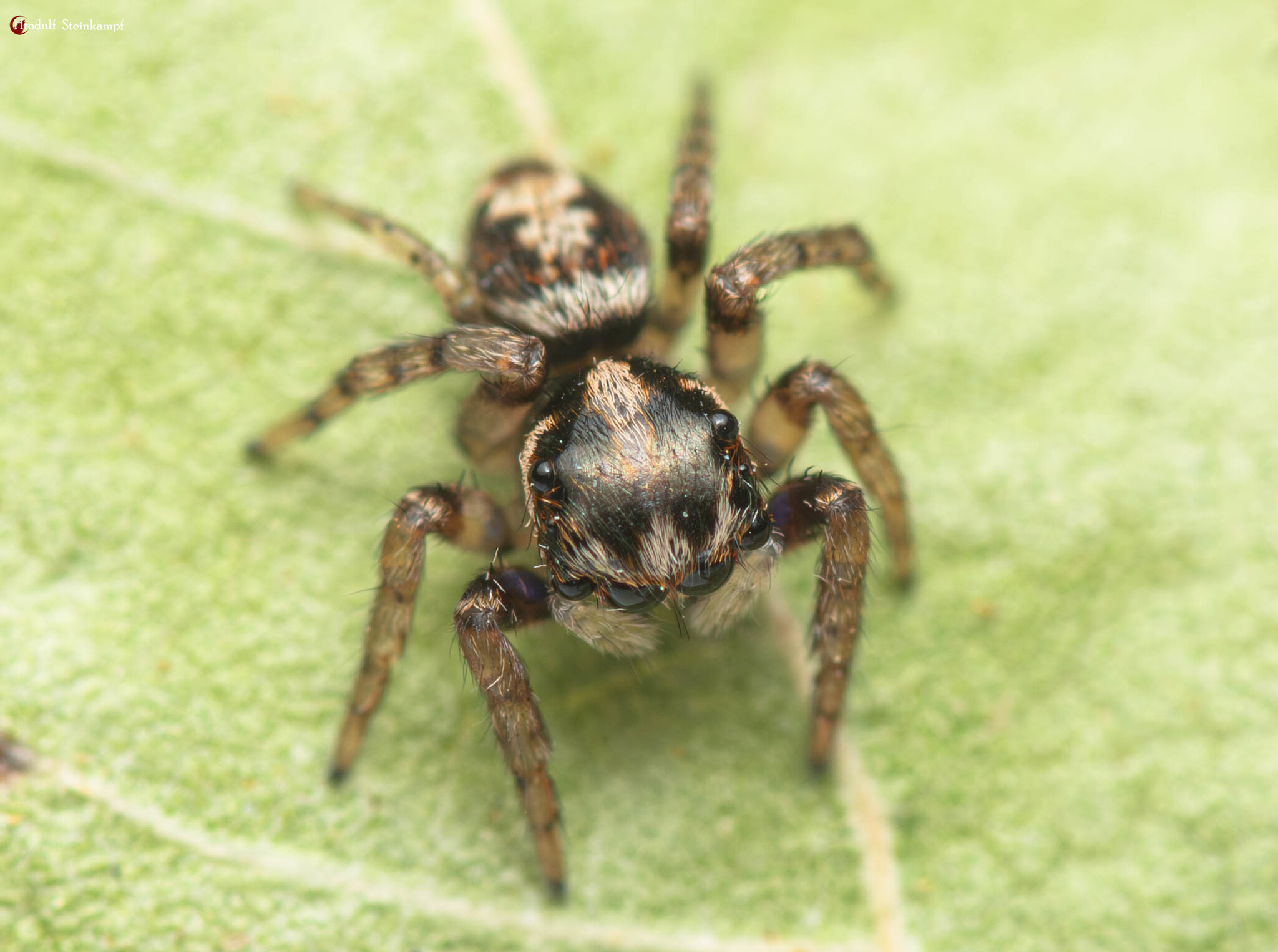
- View from above of a Thyenula armata from Langenhoven Park, Bloemfontein
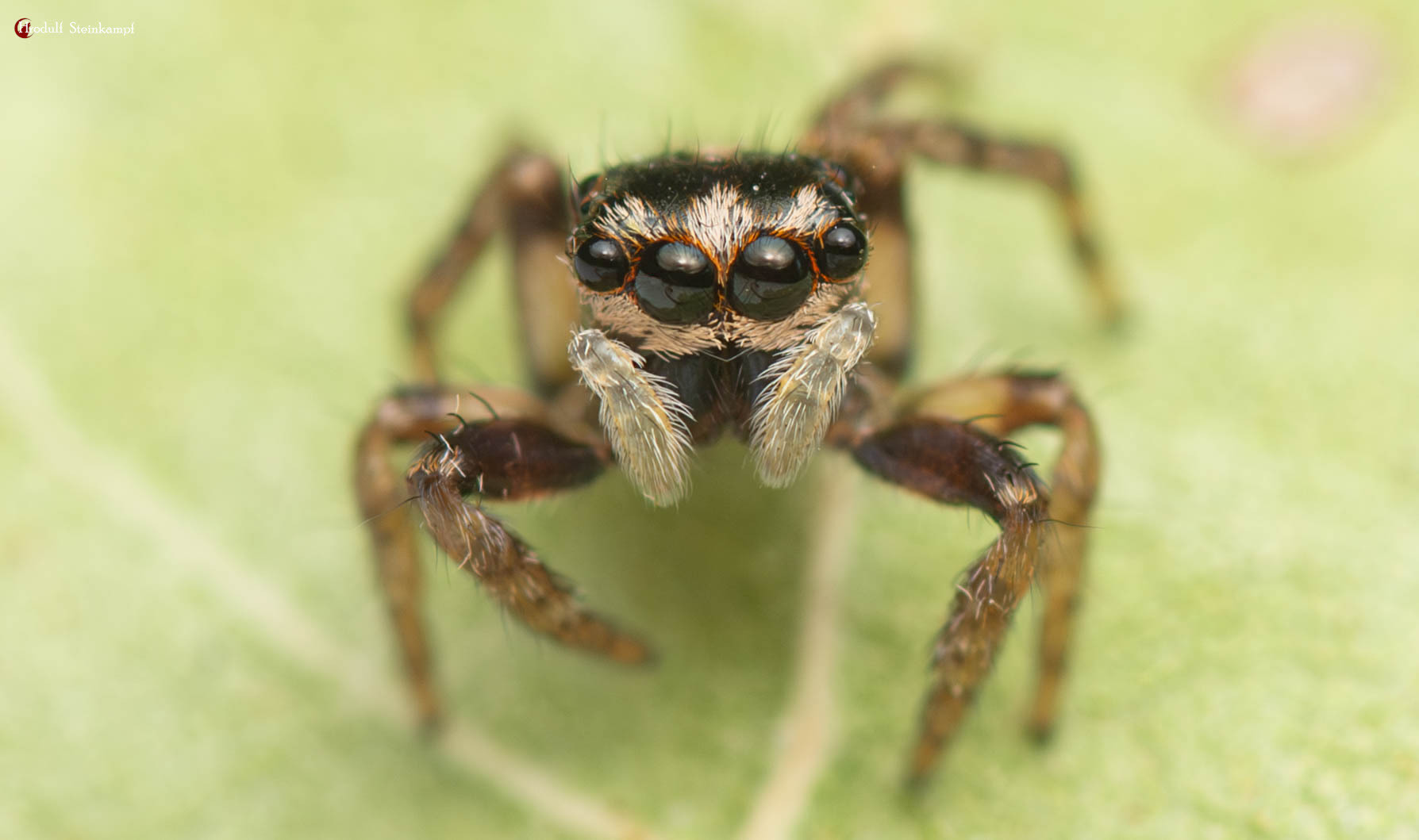
- Frontal view of the same spider

Scientific classification
- Kingdom: Animalia
- Phylum: Arthropoda
- Subphylum: Chelicerata
- Class: Arachnida
- Order: Araneae
- Infraorder: Araneomorphae
- Family: Salticidae
- Genus: Thyenula
- Species: T. armata

Binomial name
- Thyenula armata Wesołowska, 2001

= Thyenula armata =

Species of jumping spider

Thyenula armata is a species of jumping spider that lives in South Africa and Lesotho. First described by the arachnologist Wanda Wesołowska in 2001, the spider has been found living under rocks and on evergreen trees. A member of the genus Thyenula, it can be distinguished from its relatives by the presence of a thick shield-like scutum on the spider's abdomen, a feature that is recalled in the spider's specific name, which is the Latin word for 'armed'. The spider has a total length between 3.7 and 5.5 mm (0.15 and 0.22 in), the female being generally larger than the male, particularly in the size of its abdomen. The spider is generally dark brown, those found in Lesotho being darker, with two orange to light brown streaks on its back, the male having a lighter pattern than the female. The female has particularly long insemination ducts inside its oval epigyne, the visible external part of its copulatory organs, which can help to distinguish it from other spiders in the genus.

== Taxonomy and etymology ==
Thyenula armata is a species of jumping spider, a member of the family Salticidae, that was first described by the Polish arachnologist Wanda Wesołowska in 2001. It was one of over 500 species that she identified during her career, more than any other contemporary writer and second only to the French arachnologist Eugène Simon. She allocated it to the genus Thyenula, which had been first circumscribed by Simon in 1902. The spider's specific name is the Latin word for 'armed' and relates to the thick shield-like scutum on the spider's abdomen.

In 2015, the evolutionary biologist Wayne Maddison undertook a phylogenetic classification that showed that the genus is a member of tribe Euophryini. First circumscribed by Simon in 1901, the tribe has also been known as Euophrydinae, but the original name is now more prevalent. It is a member of the clade Saltafresia. The genus was part of a proposed clade named after it alongside the related genus Rumburak. In 2017, the arachnologist Jerzy Prószyński added the genus to a group of genera named Euopherines.

== Description ==
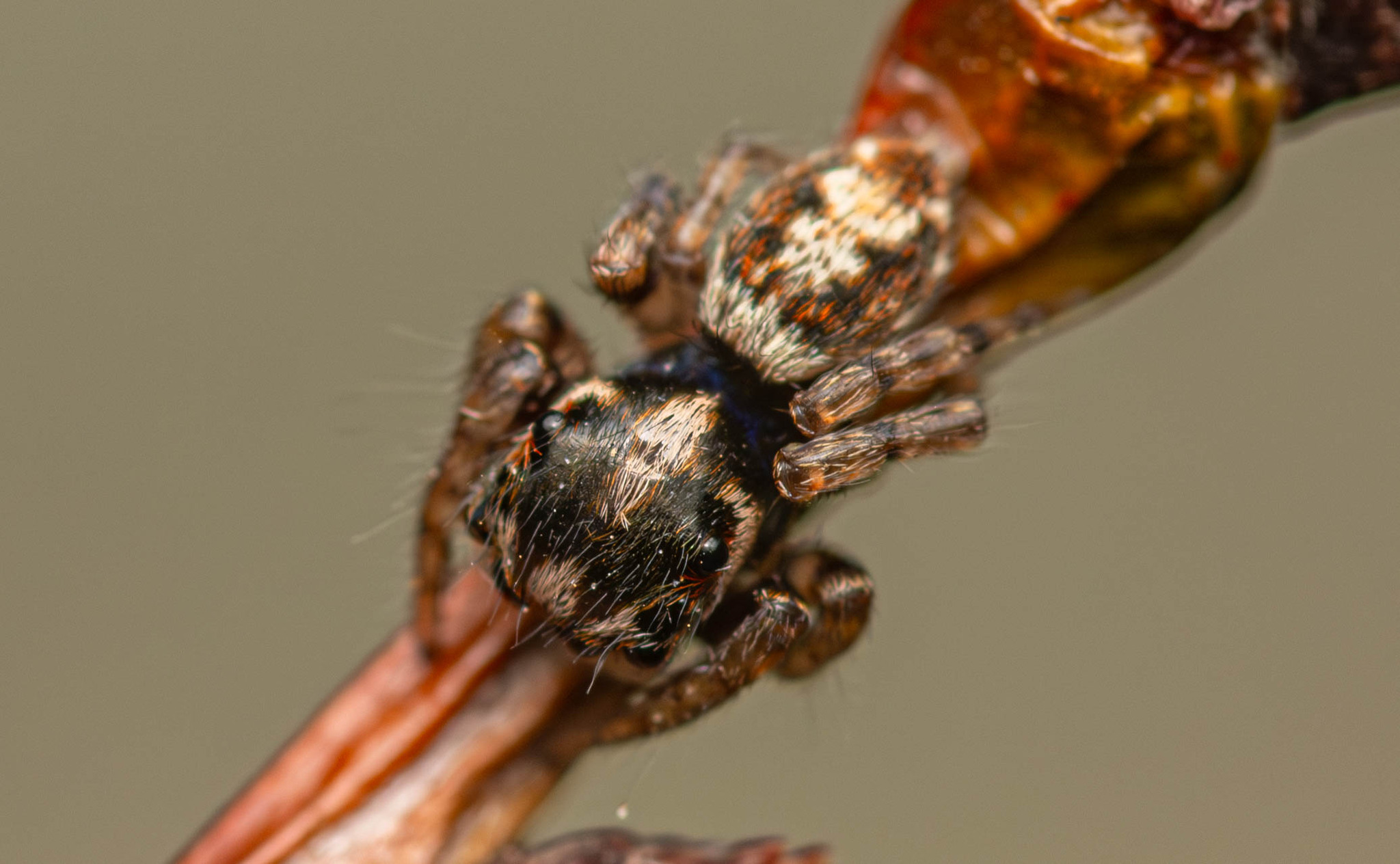
A South African Thyenula armata

Thyenula are medium to large spiders. They have a body that is divided into two main parts: a rounded cephalothorax and a more bulbous abdomen.

=== Male ===
The male Thyenula armata has an oval carapace, the hard upper part of its cephalothorax, that is between 1.9 and 2.1 mm (0.07 and 0.08 in) long, between 1.4 and 1.5 mm (0.06 and 0.06 in) wide and between 0.8 and 0.9 mm (0.03 and 0.04 in) high. It is particularly high at the back. It is generally dark brown with a black eye field and two orange to light brown streaks on its thorax. There are greyish-flaxen hairs and long brown bristles around the spider's eyes. The underside of its cephalothorax, or sternum, is brown. The part of the spider's face known as its clypeus is low and covered in grey hairs. Its chelicerae are brown with two teeth at the front and one at the back. With regard to its remaining mouthparts, its labium is also brown while its maxillae is lighter and has light ends.

The male's abdomen is smaller than its carapace, measuring 1.8 and 2.0 mm (0.07 and 0.08 in) long and between 1.3 and 1.5 mm (0.05 and 0.06 in) wide. It is a dark brown oval marked with an irregular russet streak running from the front to the back and a fawn-greyish underside with a pattern of small dark patches. It is covered in brown hairs, which are longer and bushier at the front, apart from the very back, which has white hairs. Its book lung covers are very large and show strong signs of sclerotization. Its spinnerets, which is uses to spin webs, are dark coloured. Its front pair of legs are brown and have dense light hairs covering much of their surface. Its remaining legs are orange apart from some brown lines and patches. They are also slightly smaller and thinner. The spider has long brown leg spines and brown leg hairs. Most noticeably, the spider has a large scutum that is larger than its abdomen; it covers much of its top surface and extends beyond its sides. This scutum is distinctive and helps identify the spider when compared to others in the genus.

The male's pedipalps, sensor organs near its mouth, are dark brown. At the end of a pedipalp is the male's spider's copulatory organs. Its palpal tibia has a bump on its sides and a large spike, or tibial apophysis that has a curved end. The apophysis runs next to its hairy cymbium, breaking away after a short while following an indentation in the side, to which is attached a rounded palpal bulb that has a large lump at the bottom and a smaller lumpy end at the top. Near the top of the bulb is a long narrow embolus, which starts as a curl inside the bulb that continues as it extends outside the bulb. The limits of the embolus almost match the width of the spider's cymbium.

=== Female ===
The female has cephalothorax that is similar in size to the male, measuring between 2 and 2.4 mm (0.08 and 0.09 in) in length and between 1.4 and 1.6 mm (0.06 in) in width, and an abdomen that is larger, between 2.7 and 3.1 mm (0.11 and 0.12 in) in length and between 2 and 2.5 mm (0.08 and 0.10 in) in width. Spiders from Lesotho are generally larger than those in South Africa. Its carapace is dark brown, covered in grey hairs and marked with a pattern of two orange stripes that run down the middle from the front to the back. There are long bristles near the spider's eyes, which are found on a shiny eye field. In some specimens, the spider's sternum is orange apart from its edges, which are brown; in others, it is very dark, nearly black, with a scattering of light hairs visible. Its clypeus has a covering of light hairs. The spider's chelicerae are a lighter brown that the male and its remaining mouthparts are orange or they are dark brown and the remaining mouthparts have light tips.

The top of the female's abdomen has a similar pattern on the top to the male, although it is darker and has a few bristles amongst its dense covering of brown hairs. Underneath, spiders from South Africa have an abdomen that it is generally greyish and marked with many darker dots. They have beige spinnerets and yellowish-orange legs, some of which have dark rings on them. Spider's from Lesotho have an abdomen that is covered in brown and grey hairs, amongst which can be found a small number that are. fawn. The sides of their abdomens, and the underside, are brownish-grey. They have dark spinnerets and light brown legs, with dark rings like their South African sisters.

The female spider's epigyne, the visible external part of its copulatory organs, is oval and has a large but very shallow depression near the back. There are two copulatory openings that have relatively narrow entrances and lead, via very long looping insemination ducts, to small accessory glands. The spider's spermathecae, or receptacles, are large and bean-shaped. The length of the female's insemination ducts and the way they form a loop near the front of the spider's epigyne help distinguish the spider from others in the genus.

== Distribution and habitat ==
Thyenula spiders are only found in southern Africa. Thyenula armata lives in Lesotho and South Africa. Spiders that live in Lesotho are generally darker than those in South Africa. The spider has been found in grassland living under rocks and in evergreen trees of the genus Leucosidea.
