= Thyenula oranjensis =

Conservation status
- Least Concern (IUCN 3.1)

Scientific classification
- Kingdom: Animalia
- Phylum: Arthropoda
- Subphylum: Chelicerata
- Class: Arachnida
- Order: Araneae
- Infraorder: Araneomorphae
- Family: Salticidae
- Genus: Thyenula
- Species: T. oranjensis

Binomial name
- Thyenula oranjensis Wesołowska, 2001

Species of jumping spider

Thyenula oranjensis, the Golden Gate Thyenula Jumping Spider, is a species of jumping spider that lives in South Africa. First described by the arachnologist Wanda Wesołowska in 2001, the spider has been found in grassland. A member of the genus Thyenula, the spider has a total length between 4.8 and 5.4 mm (0.19 and 0.21 in). It is generally dark brown, with two light brown streaks, two large lighter areas and an irregular russet streak on the back of the male and two light stripes and an irregular yellowish stripe running from the front to the back of the female. The female also has particularly long insemination ducts that form a distinctive loop inside its oval epigyne, the visible external part of its copulatory organs, which can help to distinguish it from other spiders in the genus. A study of the male's copulatory organs also help identify the spider, particularly the irregularly-shape of its palpal bulb with its large lump at the bottom.

== Taxonomy and etymology ==
Thyenula oranjensis is a species of jumping spider, a member of the family Salticidae, that was first described by the arachnologist Wanda Wesołowska in 2001. It was one of over 500 species that she identified during her career, more than any other contemporary writer and second only to the French arachnologist Eugène Simon. She allocated it to the genus Thyenula, which had been first circumscribed by Simon in 1902. The spider's specific name relates the place where it was first found, which was then known as Oranje Province. It is known as the Golden Gate Thyenula Jumping Spider.

In 2015, the evolutionary biologist Wayne Maddison undertook a phylogenetic classification that showed that the genus is a member of tribe Euophryini. First circumscribed by Simon in 1901, the tribe has also been known as Euophrydinae, but the original name is now more prevalent. It is a member of the clade Saltafresia. The genus was part of a proposed clade named after it alongside the related genus Rumburak. In 2017, the arachnologist Jerzy Prószyński added the genus to a group of genera named Euopherines.

== Description ==
Thyenula are medium to large spiders. They have a body that is divided into two main parts: a rounded cephalothorax and a more bulbous abdomen. The male Thyenula oranjensis has an oval carapace, the hard upper part of the cephalothorax, that is between 2.5 and 2.7 mm (0.10 and 0.11 in) long, between 1.8 and 2 mm (0.07 and 0.08 in) wide and between 0.9 and 1 mm (0.04 and 0.04 in) high. It is generally dark brown, covered in a dense mat of brown and grey hairs, with a black eye field and a pattern of two light brown stripes on its thorax. There are two large lighter areas at the back of the thorax that help distinguish the spider from the otherwise similar Thyenula hortensis. There are long brown bristles around the front row of the spider's eyes. The underside of the cephalothorax, or sternum, is dark brown. The part of the spider's face known as its clypeus is relatively low and covered in greyish hairs. Its chelicerae are dark brown while its remaining mouthparts, its labium and maxillae, are a lighter brown, its maxillae having light ends.

The male's oval abdomen is similar in size to its carapace, measuring 2.3 and 2.5 mm (0.09 and 0.10 in) long and between 1.9 and 2.1 mm (0.07 and 0.08 in) wide. The top of its abdomen is dark brown and marked with an irregular russet streak running from the front to the back and a fawn-greyish underside with a pattern of small dark patches. It is covered in brown bushy hairs. Its book lung covers are very large and show strong signs of sclerotization. Its spinnerets, which is uses to spin webs, are brown. Its front pair of legs are a darker brown than the rest. The spider has long brown leg hairs.

The male's pedipalps, sensor organs near its mouth, are dark brown. At the end of a pedipalp is the male's spider's copulatory organs. Its palpal tibia has a tuft of hairs on its sides and a large spike, or tibial apophysis that has a curved end. The apophysis runs next to its hairy cymbium, breaking away after a short while following an indentation in the side and then finishing with a kink. The cymbium is attached a irregularly-shaped palpal bulb that has a large lump at the bottom and a smaller lumpy end at the top. Near the top, a long embolus that extends, starting a curl inside the bulb that continues as it extends outside the bulb. The limits of the embolus almost match the width of the spider's cymbium. The large size of the lump at the bottom of the spider's palpal bulb has distinguish the spider from the related Thyenula ogdeni.

The female has a carapace that is similar in size to the male, measuring between 2.1 and 2.3 mm (0.08 and 0.09 in) in length and between 1.6 and 1.8 mm (0.06 and 0.07 in) in width, and an abdomen that is larger, between 2.9 and 3.1 mm (0.11 and 0.12 in) in length and between 2 and 2.2 mm (0.08 and 0.09 in) in width. Its carapace is brown with two long stripes running down its back from the front to the back and a black eye field. It sternum is yellowish. The spider's chelicerae and maxillae are brownish while its labium is brown with light tips.

The top of the female's abdomen is unusual; it is dark brown with an irregular yellowish stripe running from the front to the back. The sides of its abdomen is yellowish with a pattern of small dark dots and covered in brown and greyish hairs while underneath it is whitish-yellow. The spider's spinnerets are lighter than the male's and its legs are all light brown, apart from a pattern of darker rings. While the leg spines are brown, the legs' hairs are brownish and grey.

The female spider's epigyne, the visible external part of its copulatory organs, is rounded and has a two shallow depression near the front. There are two copulatory openings that lead, via long insemination ducts that form a loop towards the front, to small accessory glands and large bean-shaped spermathecae, or receptacles. The majority of the insemination ducts show signs of The length of the female's insemination ducts and the way they form a loop near the front of the spider's epigyne help distinguish the spider from others in the genus.

== Distribution and habitat ==
Thyenula spiders are only found in southern Africa. Thyenula oranjensis is endemic to South Africa. The spider has been found in Montane grasslands and shrublands at an altitude of between 1,500 and 1,900 m (4,900 and 6,200 ft) above sea level. Its conservation status is considered of least concern.
