= Thyenula splendens =

Scientific classification
- Kingdom: Animalia
- Phylum: Arthropoda
- Subphylum: Chelicerata
- Class: Arachnida
- Order: Araneae
- Infraorder: Araneomorphae
- Family: Salticidae
- Genus: Thyenula
- Species: T. splendens

Binomial name
- Thyenula splendens Wesołowska,& Haddad, 2018

Species of jumping spider

Thyenula splendens is a jumping spider species that lives in South Africa. A member of the genus Thyenula, the spider is large, measuring between 4.2 and 5.6 mm (0.17 and 0.22 in) in total body length. The female is larger than the male. It is also lighter, with a yellowish-brown upper side and a pattern of whitish and brown patches on its abdomen. The male has a distinctive iridescent blue-black upper side to its abdomen. Both have whitish-yellow legs, the male having black patches on some of its sections. female's epigyne, the visible external part of its copulatory organs, is small and have a pair of copulatory openings in the middle lying close to one another. This position helps identify the spider. The male has a long thin spike, or tibial apophysis, on its palpal tibia that has a row of teeth towards its end. Unlike other spiders in the genus that generally are found in forests, this spider was found on grass tussocks in the grassland near the trees.

== Etymology and taxonomy ==
Thyenula splendens is a species of jumping spider, a member of the family Salticidae, that was first described by the arachnologists Wanda Wesołowska and Charles R. Haddad in 2018. They allocated it to the genus Thyenula, which had been itself been first circumscribed by the naturalist Eugène Simon in 1902. The spider was one of over 500 species identified by Wesołowska during her career, only Simon having described more. Its specific name is the Latin word splendens, which can be translated 'shiny' and refers to the male spider's shiny abdomen.

In 2015, the evolutionary biologist Wayne Maddison undertook a phylogenetic classification that showed that the genus is a member of tribe Euophryini. First circumscribed by Simon in 1901, the tribe has also been known as Euophrydinae, but the original name is now more prevalent. It is a member of the clade Saltafresia. The genus was part of a proposed clade named after it alongside the related genus Rumburak. In 2017, the arachnologist Jerzy Prószyński added the genus to a group of genera named Euopherines.

== Description ==
Thyenula are medium-sized to large spiders with a body that is divided into two main parts, with a cephalothorax before the spider's abdomen. Thyenula splendens is strongly sexually dimorphic. The male has a cephalothorax that is between 1.9 and 2 mm (0.07 and 0.08 in) long and is typically 1.4 mm (0.06 in) wide. Its carapace, the hard upper part of the cephalothorax, is a dark brown oval with a marking of two lighter triangular patches on the side and a covering of thin colourless hairs. It has a black eye field with small whitish scales near its front eyes. The part of the underside of the carapace known as the sternum is dark yellow to blackish. Its chelicerae are small, pale and have a single tooth visible. Its remaining mouthparts, including its labium and maxillae, are pale with dark patches on its maxillae.

Behind its cephalothorax, the male has an long narrow abdomen that is between 2.3 and 2.5 mm (0.09 and 0.10 in) long and between 0.9 and 1 mm (0.04 and 0.04 in) wide. It is narrower that the abdomen of other spiders in the genus, which helps identify it in the wild. It also has a distinctive blue-black upper surface that is shiny iridescent. It is densely covered in short hairs which form a dense fur covering the back third. There are a few white hairs on the back edge of the spider. The underside of its abdomen is black with a large yellowish spot covering much of the back half. The spider has white spots above its black spinnerets, which it uses to spin webs. Its legs are generally whitish-yellow with black patches on some of the sections.

Its small pedipalps, sensor organs near its mouth, are generally brown. At the end of a pedipalp is the male's spider's copulatory organs. Its palpal tibia has a clump of long hairs on one side and, on the other side, a long thin spike, or tibial apophysis that has a row of small teeth on the end. At the end of the tibia is a cymbium, to which is attached a bulbous palpal bulb that has a lump at the bottom and a long coiled embolus at the top. There is pale belt that runs across the spider's cymbium, tibia and patella.

The female is larger and paler than the male. Its cephalothorax is typically 2.2 mm (0.09 in) long and 1.4 mm wide, but its abdomen is much larger and more rounded, between 3.1 and 3.1 mm (0.12 and 0.12 in) in length and between 2.1 and 2.2 mm (0.08 and 0.09 in) in width. Its carapace is yellowish-brown with a black eye field. There are a few brown hairs on its surface and white scales around its front-most eyes. Its sternum is yellow, as are its mouthparts. Its abdomen is a white ovoid that is covered on its upper surface in small brown patches and other markings. In the middle of its abdomen, the density of these patches create two dark streaks. Underneath, its abdomen is yellow. Its spinnerets are also yellow while its legs are mainly whitish-yellow with brown leg hairs and light spines.

The female's epigyne, the visible external part of its copulatory organs, is small and has a heart-shaped depression in the middle. There are two copulatory openings located to the middle of its epigene that lead to insemination ducts that loop towards the back of the spider and then lead to large bean-shaped spermathecae, or receptacles. The position of the copulatory openings is what most clearly distinguishes the female from other members of the genus.

== Distribution and habitat ==
Although Thyenula spiders can be found across Southern Africa,Thyenula splendens is endemic to South Africa. The species has only be found amongst the Amathole Mountains in Eastern Cape. It is an unusual species as, unlike its relatives, it does not live in dense forest. Instead, it has been found on grass tussocks in the alpine grasslands that lie near mountain forests.
