= Thyenula dentatidens =

Scientific classification
- Kingdom: Animalia
- Phylum: Arthropoda
- Subphylum: Chelicerata
- Class: Arachnida
- Order: Araneae
- Infraorder: Araneomorphae
- Family: Salticidae
- Genus: Thyenula
- Species: T. dentatidens

Binomial name
- Thyenula dentatidens Wesołowska, Azarkina & Russell-Smith, 2014

Species of jumping spider

Thyenula dentatidens is a jumping spider species that lives in South Africa. A member of the genus Thyenula, the spider is medium-sized to large, measuring between 6.3 and 8.4 mm (0.25 and 0.33 in) in total body length. It has been found living amongst Trichilia emetica trees. The spider is generally brown on its surfaces with brown spots on its abdomen having a creamy-white background. Underneath, it is generally lighter than the upper surfaces, particularly its abdomen, which is yellowish with a hint of grey. The male has longer brown front legs, the remainder being lighter. The male spider has a very long fang or tooth in its chelicerae, which is recalled in the spider's specific name that can be translated 'toothed'. The female has not been described.

== Etymology and taxonomy ==
Thyenula dentatidens is a species of jumping spider, a member of the family Salticidae, that was first described by the arachnologists Wanda Wesołowska, Galina Azarkina and Anthony Russell-Smith in 2014. They allocated it to the genus Thyenula, which had been itself been first circumscribed by the naturalist Eugène Simon in 1902. The spider was one of over 500 species identified by Wesołowska during her career, only Simon having described more. Its specific name is related to a Latin word that can be translated 'toothed' and recalls the spider's very long tooth.

In 2015, the evolutionary biologist Wayne Maddison undertook a phylogenetic classification that showed that the genus is a member of tribe Euophryini. First circumscribed by Simon in 1901, the tribe has also been known as Euophrydinae, but the original name is now more prevalent. It is a member of the clade Saltafresia. The genus was part of a proposed clade named after it alongside the related genus Rumburak. In 2017, the arachnologist Jerzy Prószyński added the genus to a group of genera named Euopherines.

== Description ==
Thyenula are medium-sized to large spiders. They have a body that is divided into two main parts: an oval cephalothorax, behind that, and a thinner abdomen. The male Thyenula dentatidens has a moderately high cephalothorax that is between 3.4 and 4.1 mm (0.13 and 0.16 in) long and .6 and 3.1 mm (0.02 and 0.12 in) wide. Its carapace, the hard upper part of the cephalothorax, is high, brown and marked with a scattering of brown hairs. It has darker edges and a noticeable fovea towards its centre. There are long bristles and black rings around the spider's eyes. The part of the underside of the spider's carapace known as its sternum is light brown. The spider's face, or clypeus, is low and darl. Its jaws, or chelicerae, are very large with one large fang, two small teeth to its front margins and one long tooth behind. Its remaining mouthparts, including its labium and maxillae, are brown with whitish tips.

Behind its cephalothorax, the male has an oval abdomen that is between 2.9 and 4.3 mm (0.11 and 0.17 in) long and between 2 and 3.5 mm (0.08 and 0.14 in) wide. Its topside is creamy white and has a covering of dark brown spots, divided by light serrated line than becomes a series of chevrons as it tends towards the back of the spider. Underneath, the abdomen is yellowish a hint of grey. There are a few brown hairs on its abdomen. The spider has light grey spinnerets that it uses to spin webs. Its front pair of legs are generally brown with black streaks on some of its segments and covered in black hairs. Its remaining legs are smaller and light brown, its femora being even lighter. Its remaining leg hairs and its leg spines are brown.

Its pedipalps, sensor organs near its mouth, are small with long thin femora. At the end of its hairy pedipalp is the male's spider's copulatory organs. Its palpal tibia has a large spike, or tibial apophysis. The apophysis runs next to its hairy cymbium, to which is attached a rounded palpal bulb that has a long embolus that starts towards the middle and curls around more than once before it sticks out towards the top of the bulb . The female has not been described.

== Distribution and habitat ==
Although Thyenula spiders can be found across Southern Africa,Thyenula dentatidens is endemic to South Africa. The species has only been found in iSimangaliso Wetland Park in KwaZulu-Natal. It has been seen living amongst Trichilia emetica trees and was collected by fogging.
