= Thyenula arcana =

Scientific classification
- Kingdom: Animalia
- Phylum: Arthropoda
- Subphylum: Chelicerata
- Class: Arachnida
- Order: Araneae
- Infraorder: Araneomorphae
- Family: Salticidae
- Genus: Thyenula
- Species: T. arcana

Binomial name
- Thyenula arcana Wesołowska & Cumming, 2008

Species of spider

Thyenula arcana is a jumping spider species that lives in Zimbabwe. The female was described in 2008. Originally named Tularosa arcana, it was moved to the genus Thyenula in 2014.
