= Thyenula vulnifica =

Scientific classification
- Kingdom: Animalia
- Phylum: Arthropoda
- Subphylum: Chelicerata
- Class: Arachnida
- Order: Araneae
- Infraorder: Araneomorphae
- Family: Salticidae
- Genus: Thyenula
- Species: T. vulnifica

Binomial name
- Thyenula vulnifica Wesołowska, Azarkina & Russell-Smith, 2014

Species of spider

Thyenula vulnifica is a jumping spider species in the genus Thyenula that lives in South Africa.
