= Thyenula magna =

Scientific classification
- Kingdom: Animalia
- Phylum: Arthropoda
- Subphylum: Chelicerata
- Class: Arachnida
- Order: Araneae
- Infraorder: Araneomorphae
- Family: Salticidae
- Genus: Thyenula
- Species: T. magna

Binomial name
- Thyenula magna Wesołowska & Haddad, 2009

Species of spider

Thyenula magna is a jumping spider species in the genus Thyenula that lives in South Africa. Only the male has been described.
