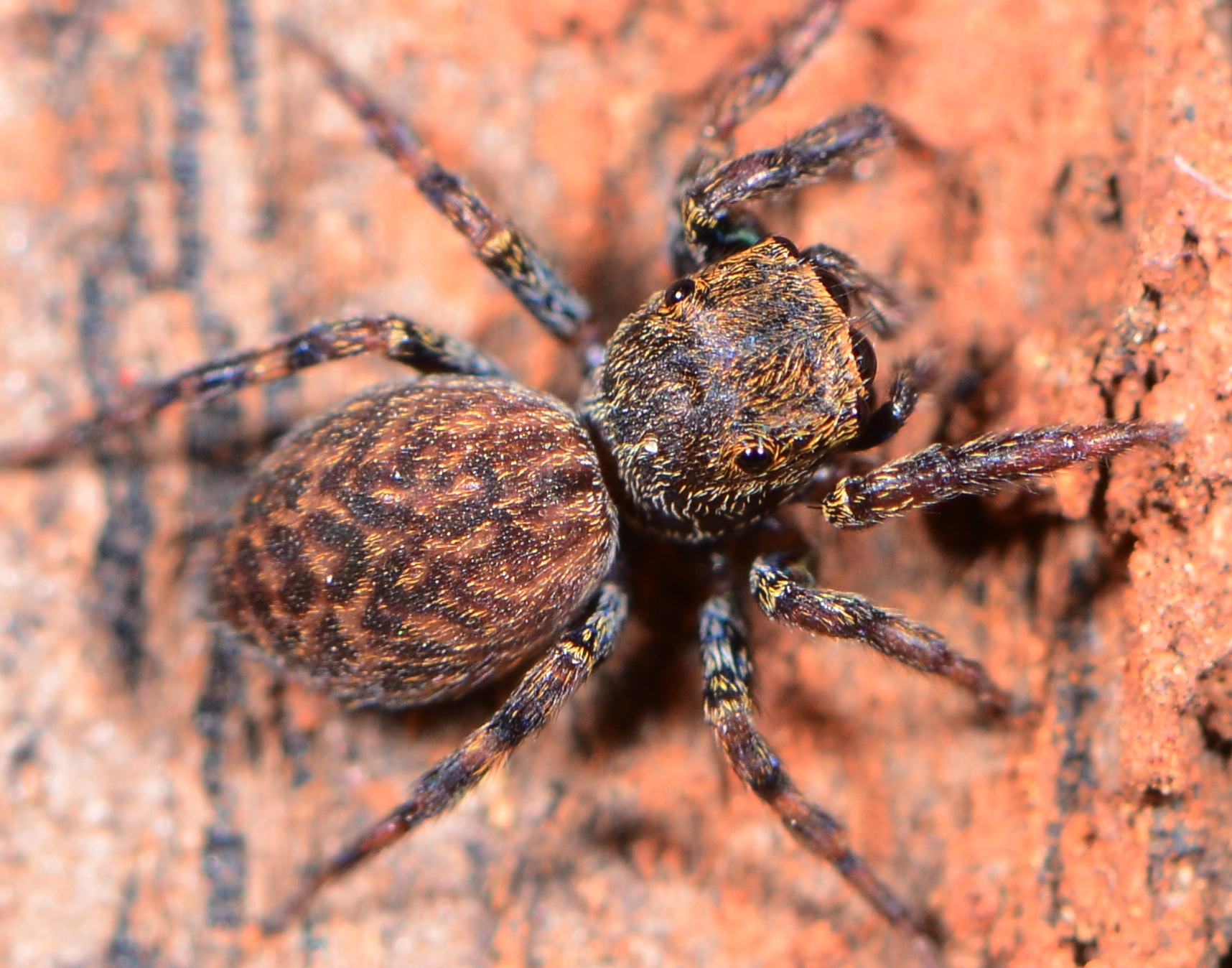
- female T. wesolowskae
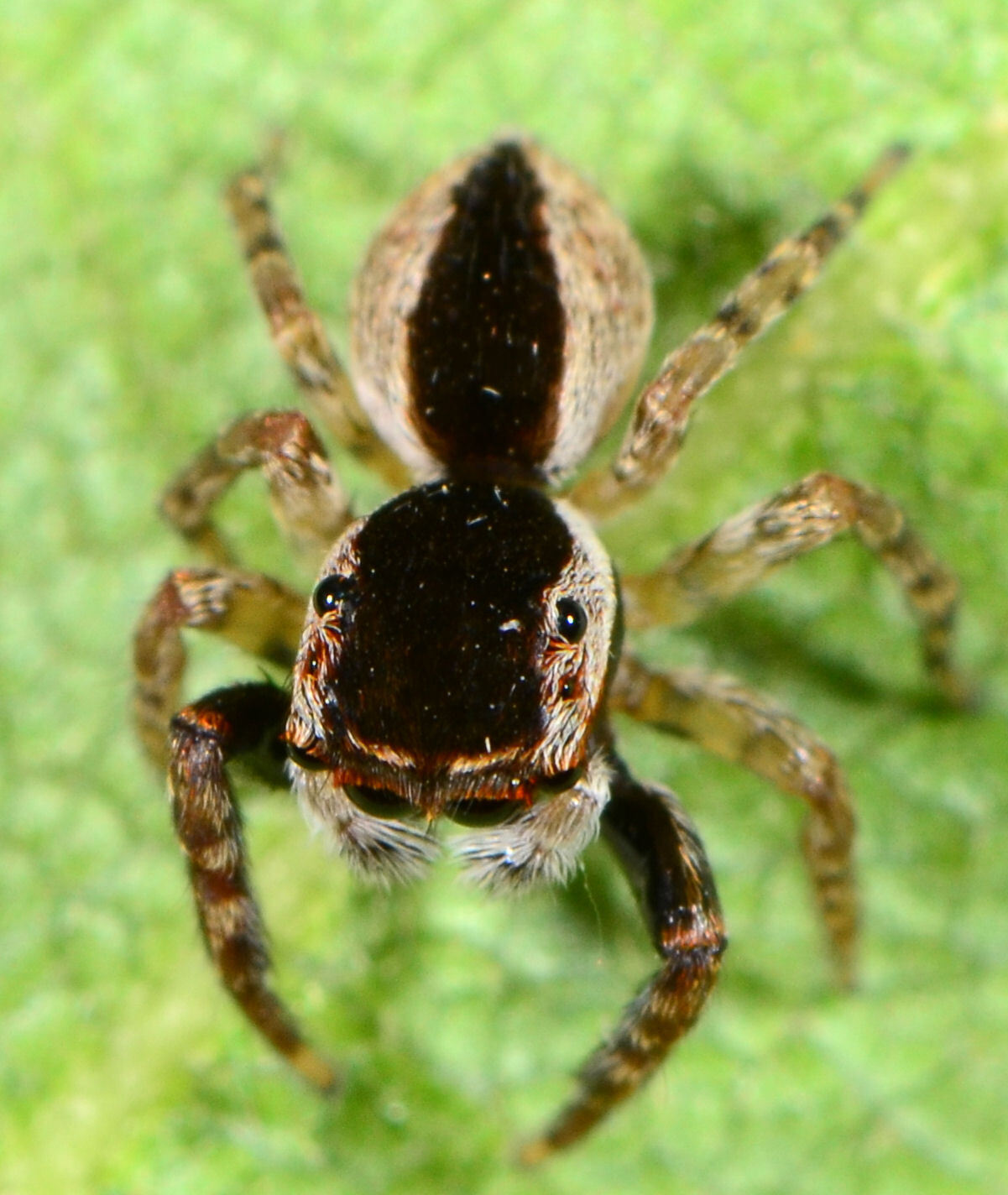
- male T. leighi

Scientific classification
- Kingdom: Animalia
- Phylum: Arthropoda
- Subphylum: Chelicerata
- Class: Arachnida
- Order: Araneae
- Infraorder: Araneomorphae
- Family: Salticidae
- Subfamily: Salticinae
- Genus: Thyenula; Simon, 1902

Type species
- T. juvenca Simon, 1902

Species
- 24, see text

Synonyms
- Klamathia Peckham & Peckham, 1903; Tularosa Peckham & Peckham, 1903

= Thyenula =

Genus of spiders

Thyenula is a genus of African jumping spiders that was first described by Eugène Louis Simon in 1902.

== Species ==
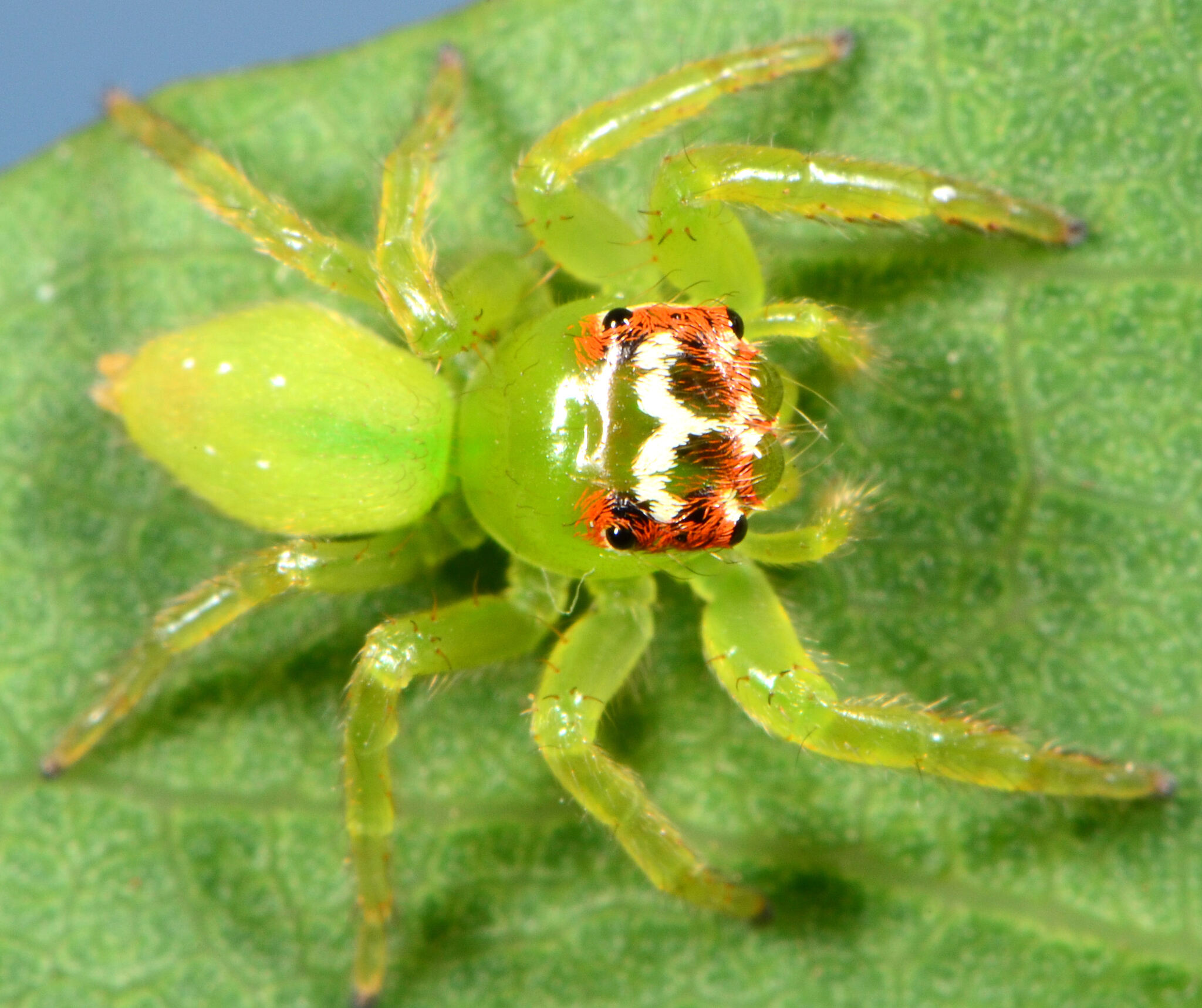
female T. juvenca

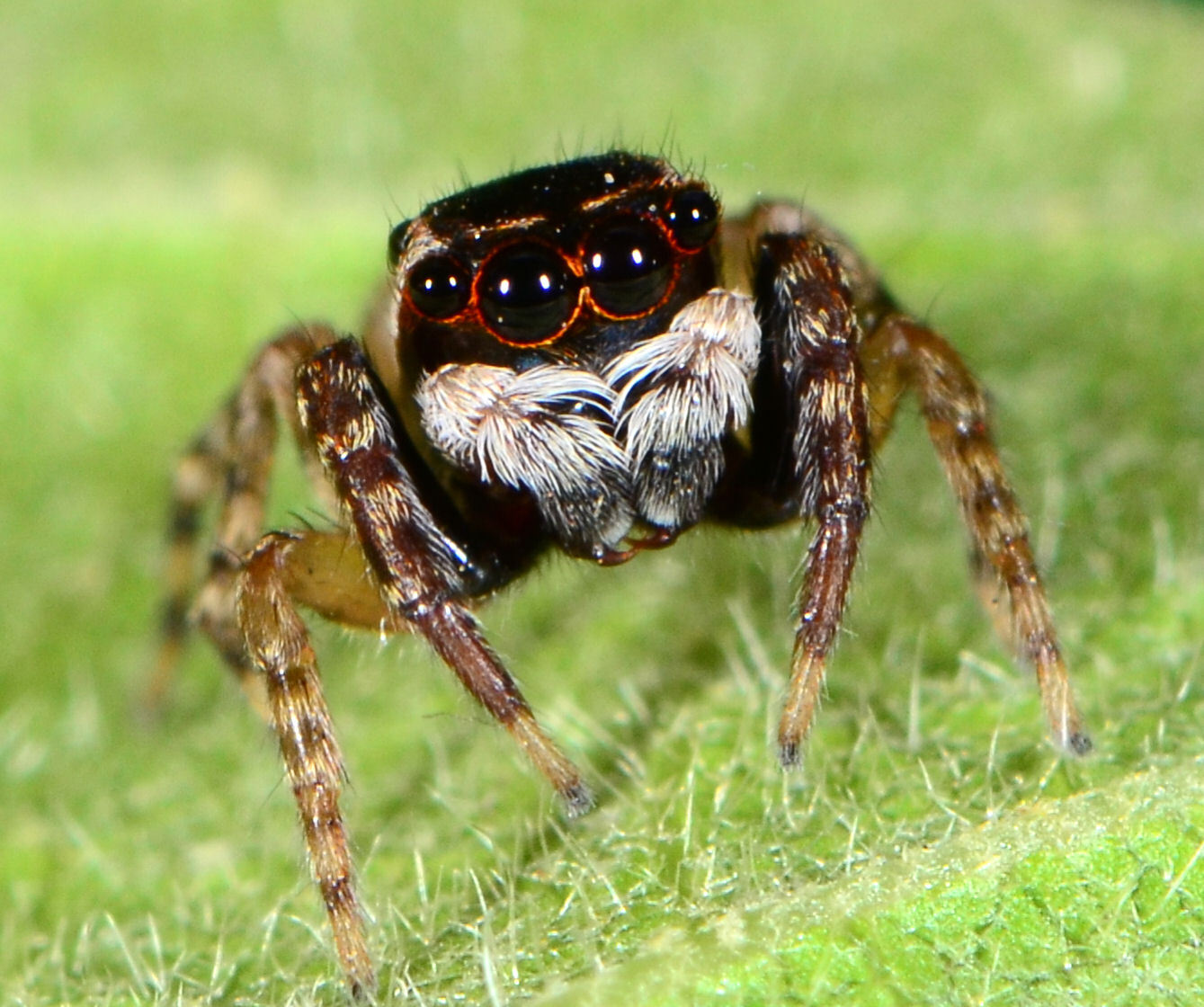
male T. leighi

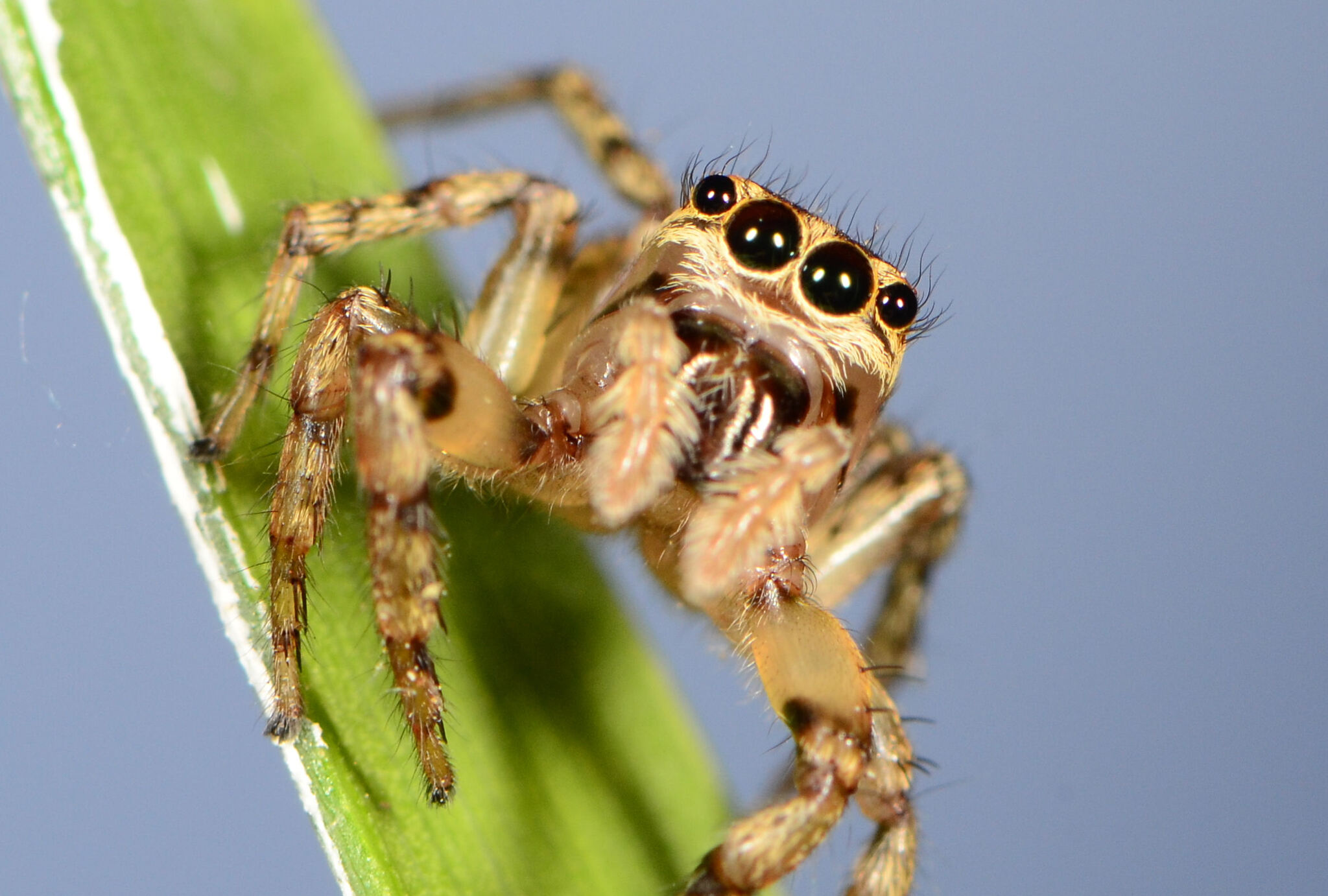
female T. rufa

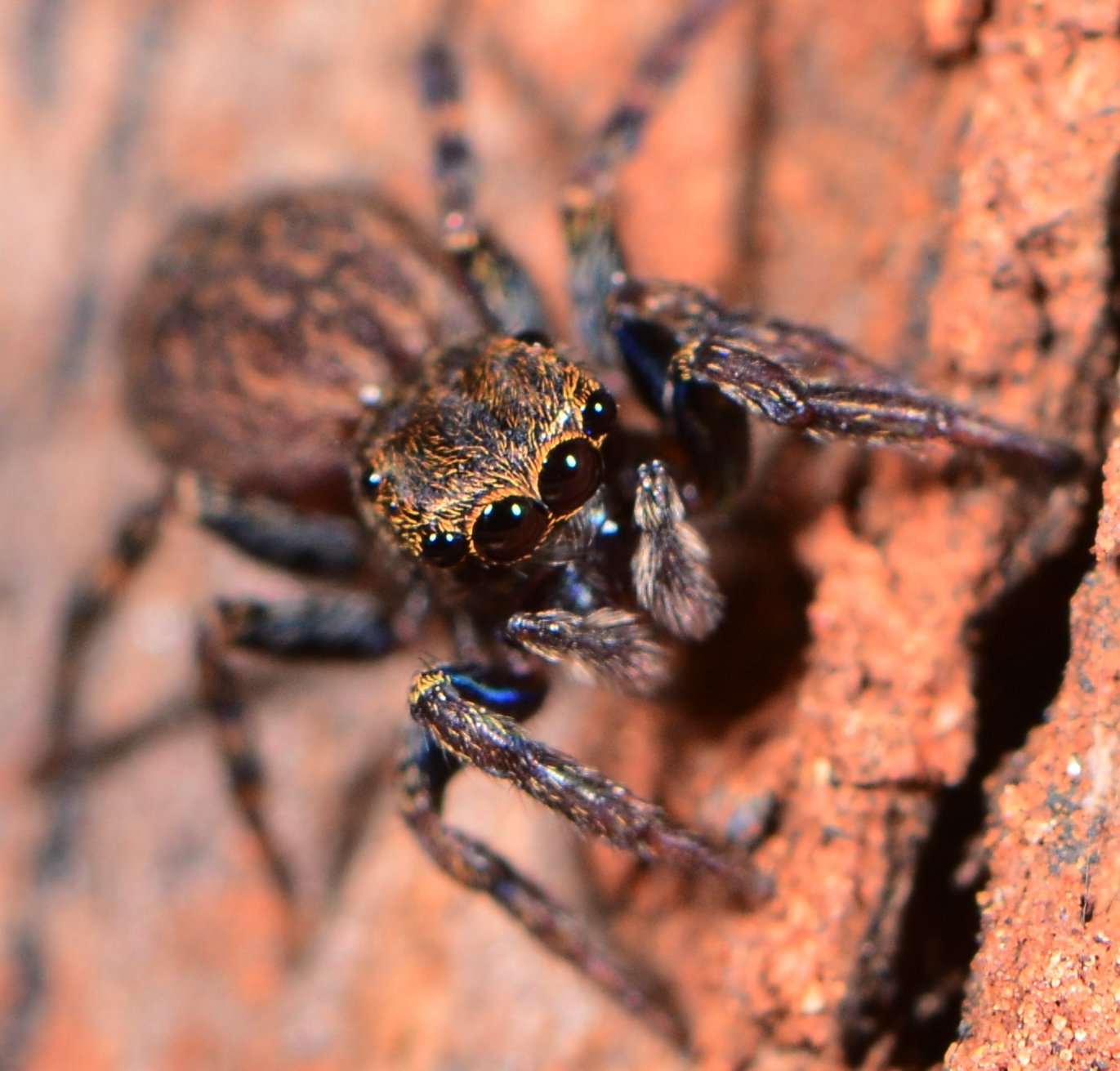
female T. wesolowskae

As of October 2025, this genus includes 24 species:

- Thyenula alotama Wesołowska, Azarkina & Russell-Smith, 2014 – South Africa
- Thyenula ammonis Denis, 1947 – Egypt
- Thyenula arcana (Wesołowska & Cumming, 2008) – Zimbabwe
- Thyenula armata Wesołowska, 2001 – South Africa, Lesotho
- Thyenula aurantiaca (Simon, 1902) – Mozambique, South Africa
- Thyenula cheliceroides Wesołowska, Azarkina & Russell-Smith, 2014 – South Africa
- Thyenula clarosignata Wesołowska, Azarkina & Russell-Smith, 2014 – South Africa
- Thyenula dentatidens Wesołowska, Azarkina & Russell-Smith, 2014 – South Africa
- Thyenula fidelis Wesołowska & Haddad, 2009 – South Africa
- Thyenula haddadi Wesołowska, Azarkina & Russell-Smith, 2014 – South Africa
- Thyenula juvenca Simon, 1902 – South Africa (type species)
- Thyenula leighi (G. W. Peckham & E. G. Peckham, 1903) – Mozambique, South Africa
- Thyenula magna Wesołowska & Haddad, 2009 – South Africa
- Thyenula montana Wesołowska, Azarkina & Russell-Smith, 2014 – Lesotho
- Thyenula munda (G. W. Peckham & E. G. Peckham, 1903) – Uganda, Zimbabwe, Mozambique
- Thyenula natalica (Simon, 1902) – South Africa
- Thyenula oranjensis Wesołowska, 2001 – South Africa
- Thyenula rufa Wesołowska, Azarkina & Russell-Smith, 2014 – South Africa
- Thyenula sempiterna Wesołowska, 2000 – Zimbabwe, South Africa
- Thyenula splendens Wesołowska & Haddad, 2018 – South Africa
- Thyenula tenebrica Wesołowska, Azarkina & Russell-Smith, 2014 – South Africa
- Thyenula virgulata Wesołowska, Azarkina & Russell-Smith, 2014 – South Africa
- Thyenula vulnifica Wesołowska, Azarkina & Russell-Smith, 2014 – South Africa
- Thyenula wesolowskae Zhang & Maddison, 2012 – South Africa
