= Rumburak lateripunctatus =

Scientific classification
- Kingdom: Animalia
- Phylum: Arthropoda
- Subphylum: Chelicerata
- Class: Arachnida
- Order: Araneae
- Infraorder: Araneomorphae
- Family: Salticidae
- Genus: Rumburak
- Species: R. lateripunctatus

Binomial name
- Rumburak lateripunctatus Wesołowska, Azarkina & Russell-Smith, 2014

Species of spider

Rumburak lateripunctatus is a jumping spider species that lives in South Africa. It is the type species of the genus Rumburak.
