= Thyenula sempiterna =

Scientific classification
- Kingdom: Animalia
- Phylum: Arthropoda
- Subphylum: Chelicerata
- Class: Arachnida
- Order: Araneae
- Infraorder: Araneomorphae
- Family: Salticidae
- Genus: Thyenula
- Species: T. sempiterna

Binomial name
- Thyenula sempiterna Wesołowska, 2000

Species of spider

Thyenula sempiterna is a jumping spider species in the genus Thyenula that lives in Zimbabwe and South Africa. The female was first described in 2000 and the male in 2014.
