= Rumburak hilaris =

Scientific classification
- Kingdom: Animalia
- Phylum: Arthropoda
- Subphylum: Chelicerata
- Class: Arachnida
- Order: Araneae
- Infraorder: Araneomorphae
- Family: Salticidae
- Genus: Rumburak
- Species: R. hilaris

Binomial name
- Rumburak hilaris Wesołowska, Azarkina & Russell-Smith, 2014

Species of spider

Rumburak hilaris is a jumping spider species in the genus Rumburak that lives in South Africa.
