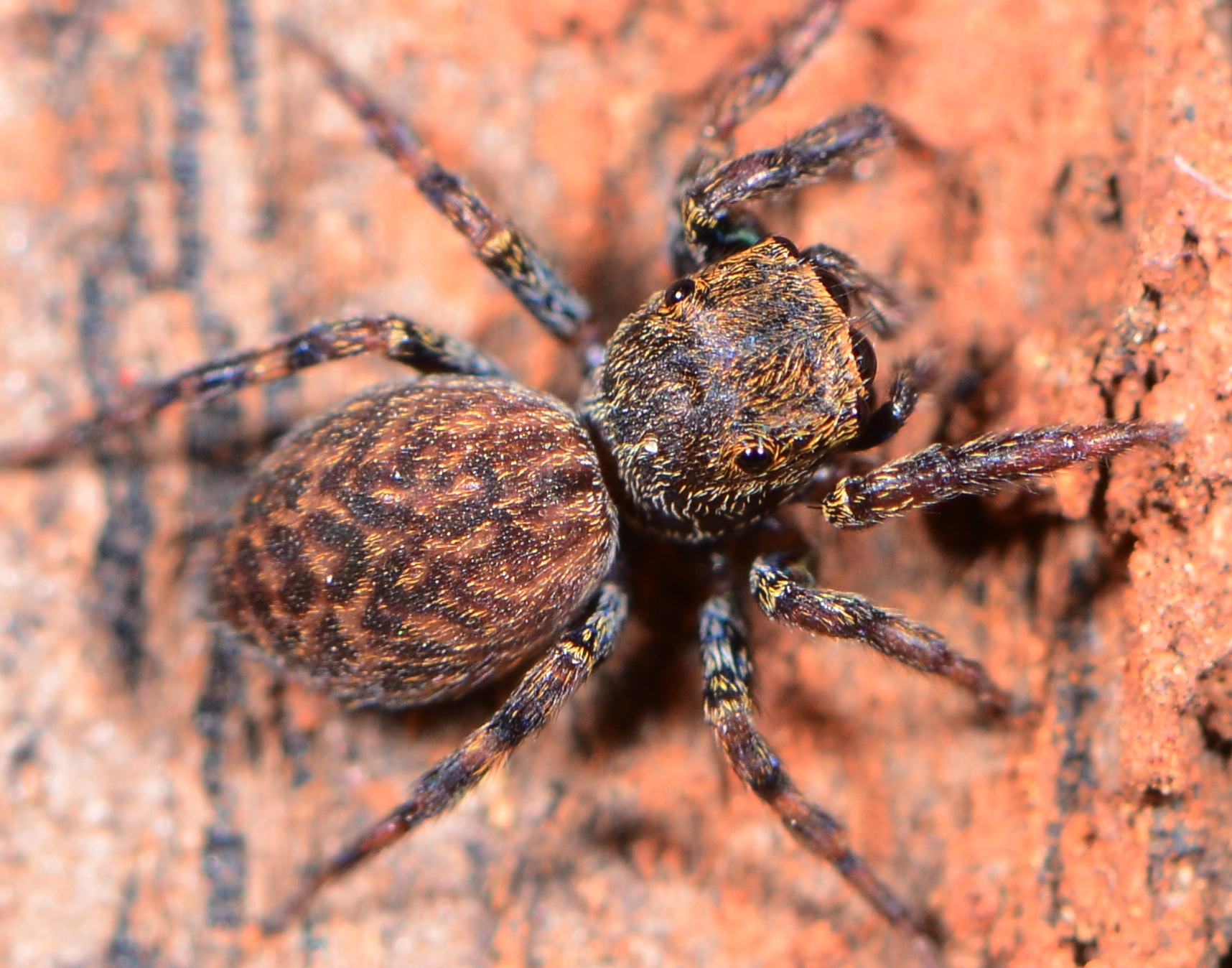
- female
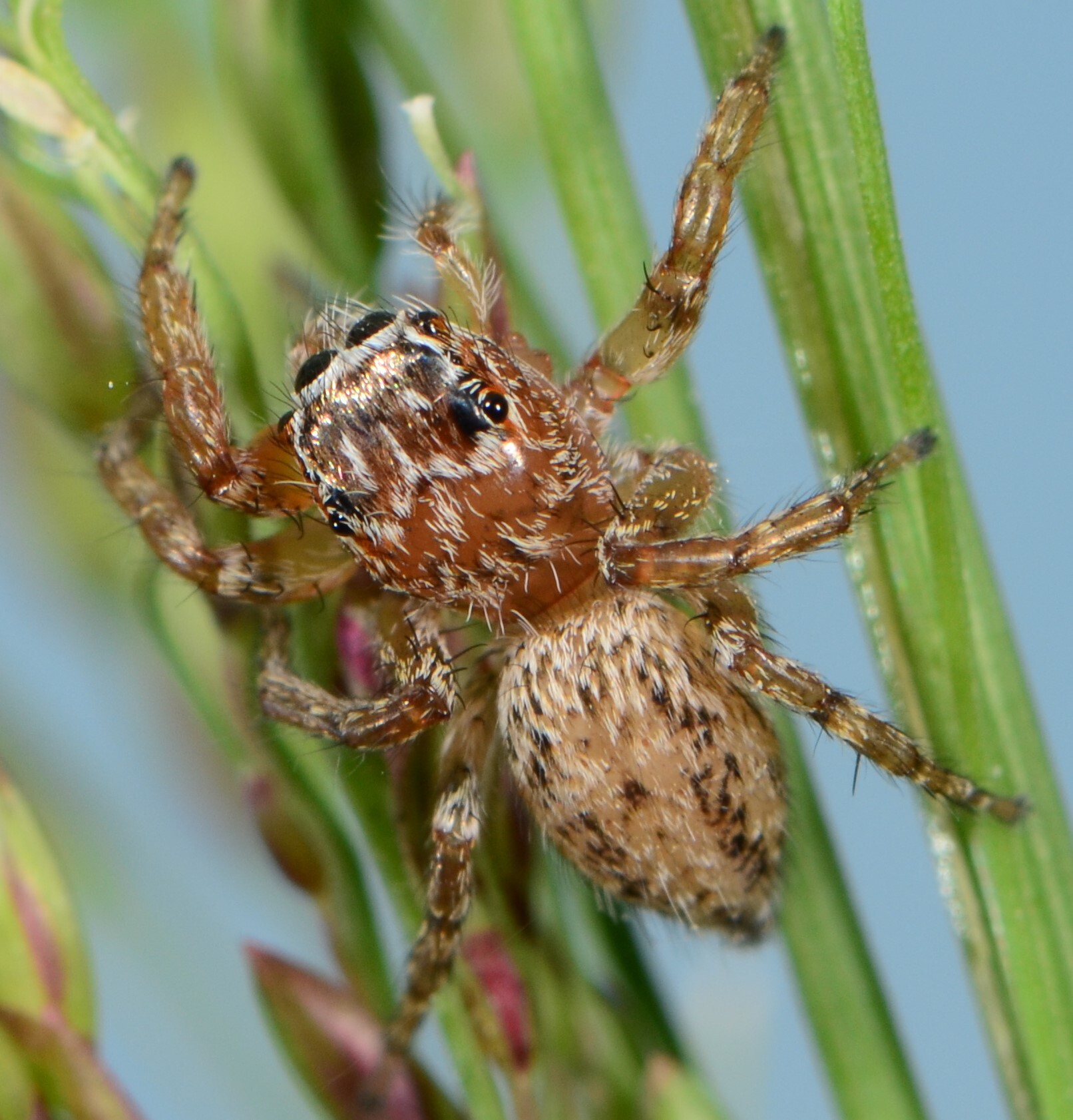
- juvenile female

Scientific classification
- Kingdom: Animalia
- Phylum: Arthropoda
- Subphylum: Chelicerata
- Class: Arachnida
- Order: Araneae
- Infraorder: Araneomorphae
- Family: Salticidae
- Genus: Thyenula
- Species: T. wesolowskae

Binomial name
- Thyenula wesolowskae Zhang & Maddison, 2012

= Thyenula wesolowskae =

Species of spider

Thyenula wesolowskae is a jumping spider species in the genus Thyenula that lives in South Africa.

The species is named after prominent arachnologist Wanda Wesolowska.

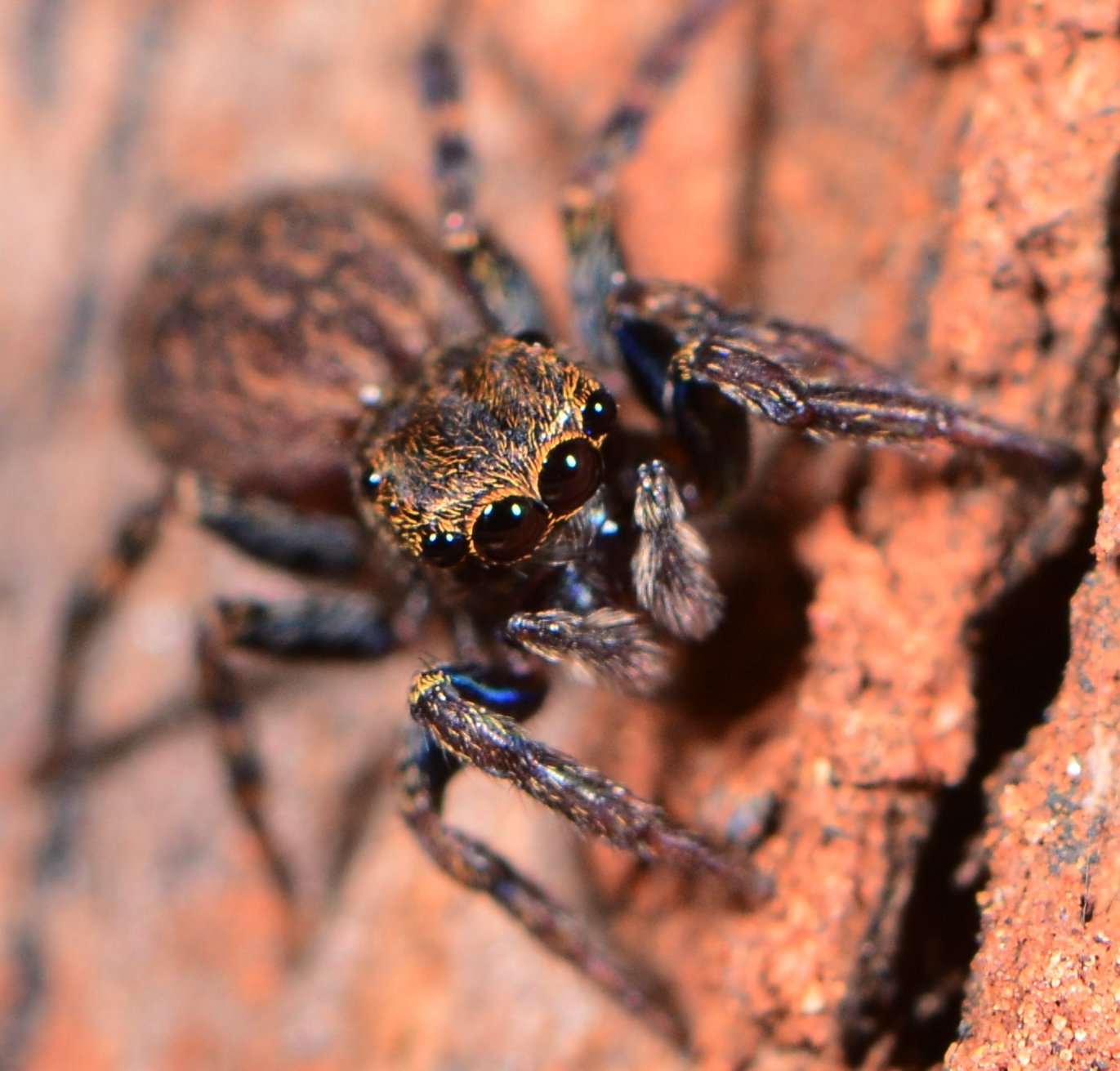
female

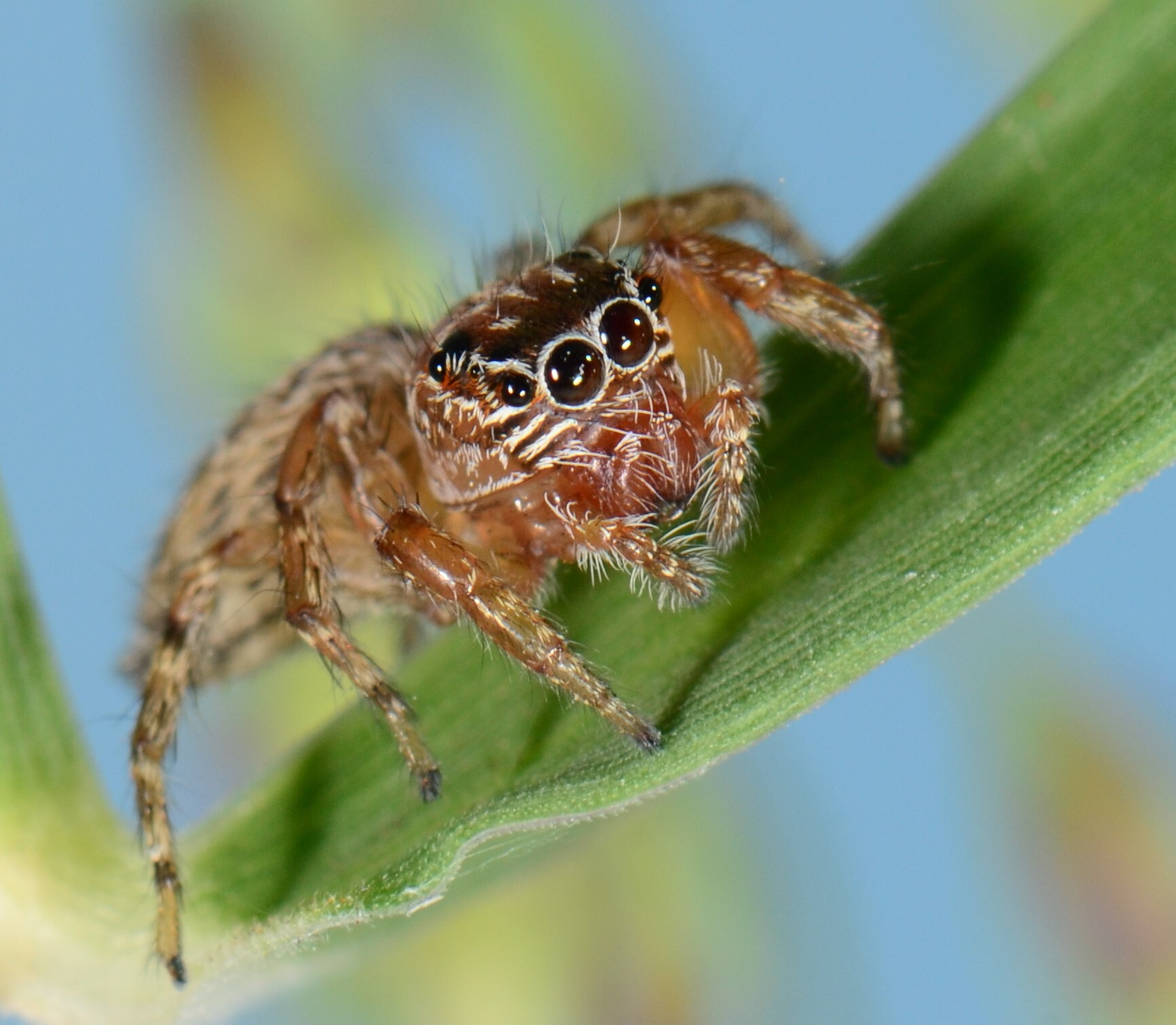
juvenile female

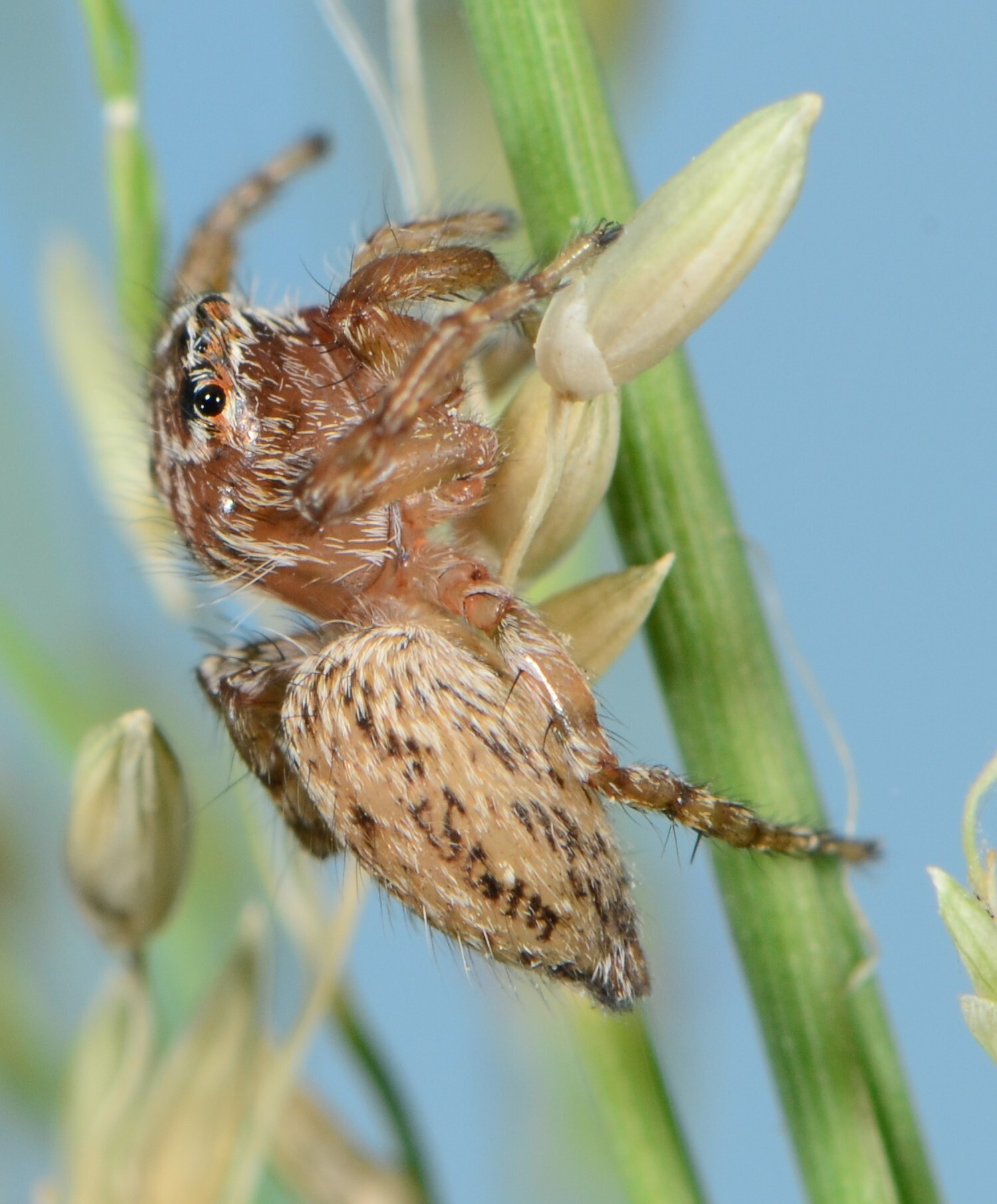
juvenile female
