= Thyenula leighi =

Scientific classification
- Kingdom: Animalia
- Phylum: Arthropoda
- Subphylum: Chelicerata
- Class: Arachnida
- Order: Araneae
- Infraorder: Araneomorphae
- Family: Salticidae
- Genus: Thyenula
- Species: T. leighi

Binomial name
- Thyenula leighi (G. W. Peckham & E. G. Peckham, 1903)

Species of spider

Thyenula leighi is a species of jumping spider found in Mozambique and South Africa.
