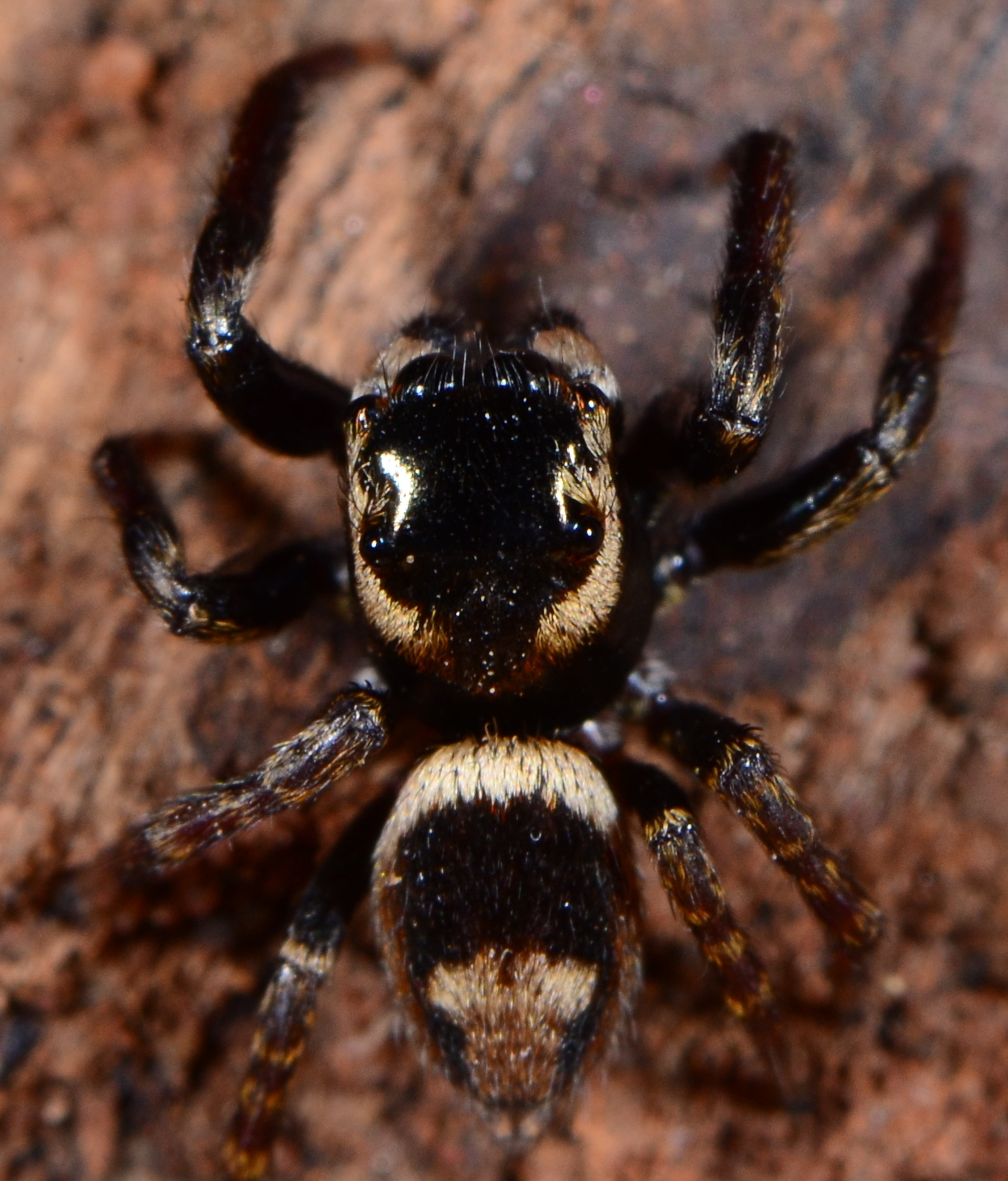
- Female R. laxus
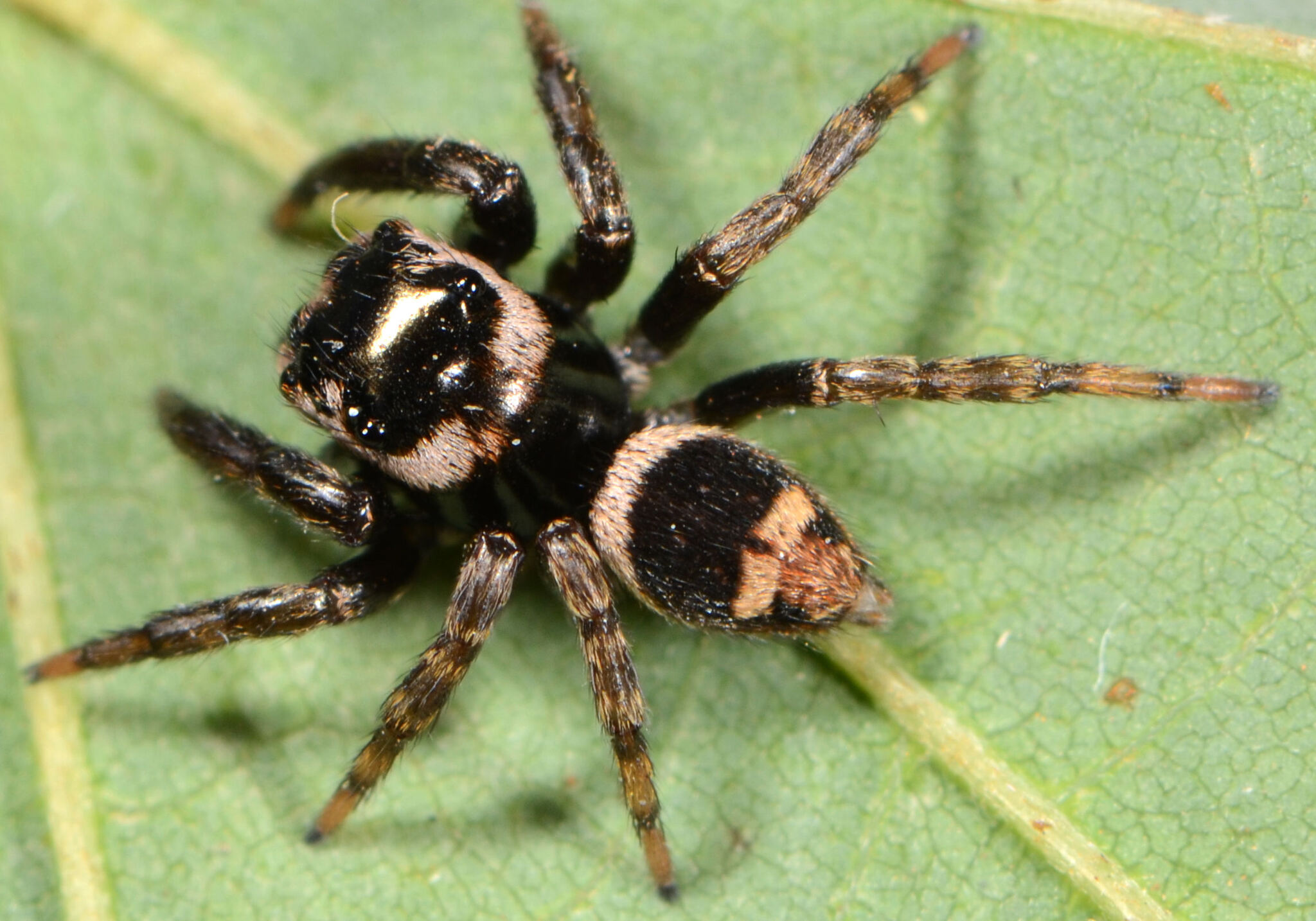
- Male R. laxus

Scientific classification
- Kingdom: Animalia
- Phylum: Arthropoda
- Subphylum: Chelicerata
- Class: Arachnida
- Order: Araneae
- Infraorder: Araneomorphae
- Family: Salticidae
- Subfamily: Salticinae
- Genus: Rumburak; Wesołowska, Azarkina & Russell-Smith

Type species
- Rumburak lateripunctatus

Species
- 7, see text

= Rumburak =

Genus of spiders

Rumburak is a genus of spiders in the family Salticidae. It was first described in 2014 by Wesołowska, Azarkina & Russell-Smith. All described species are endemic to South Africa.

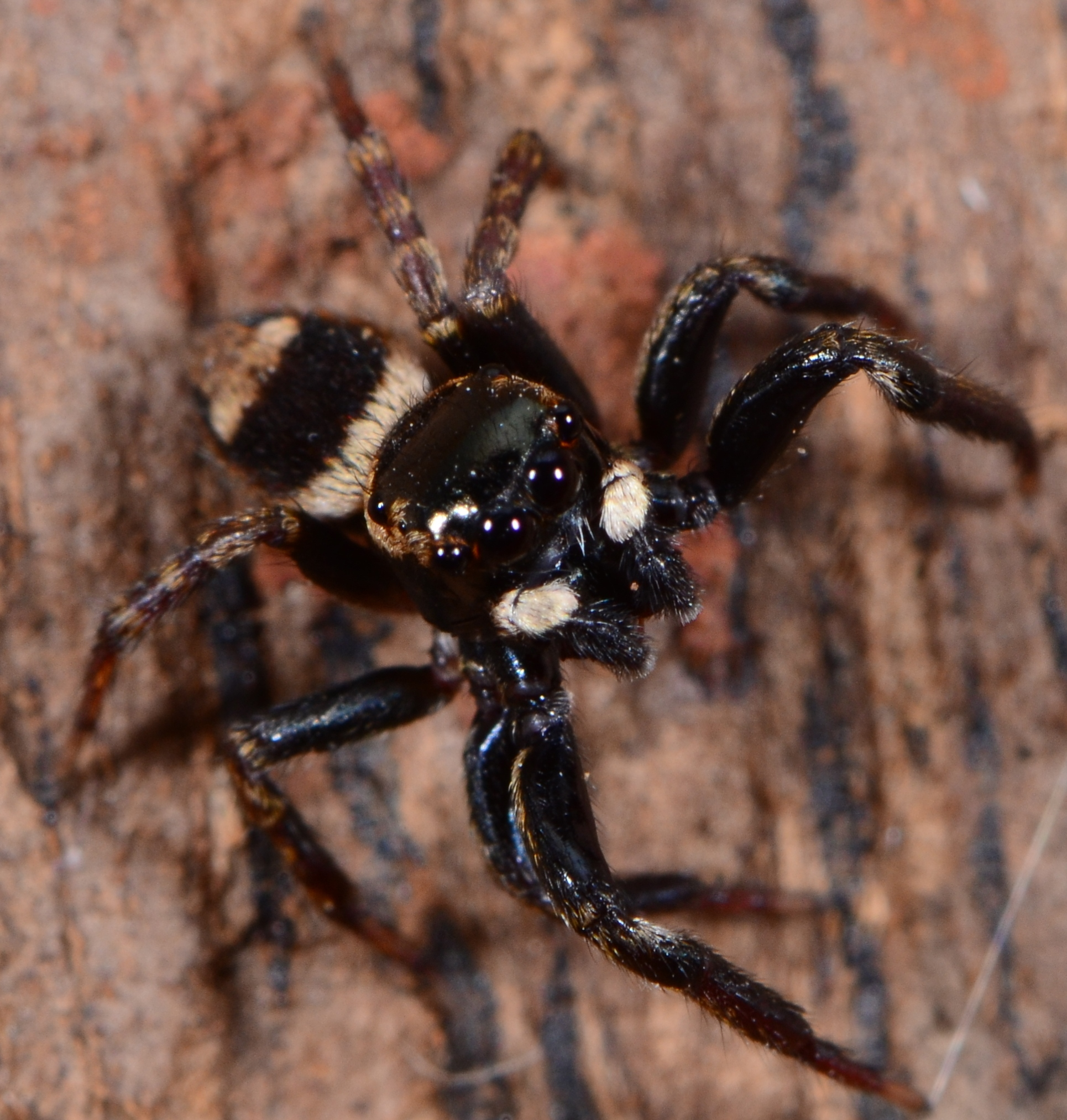
female R. laxus

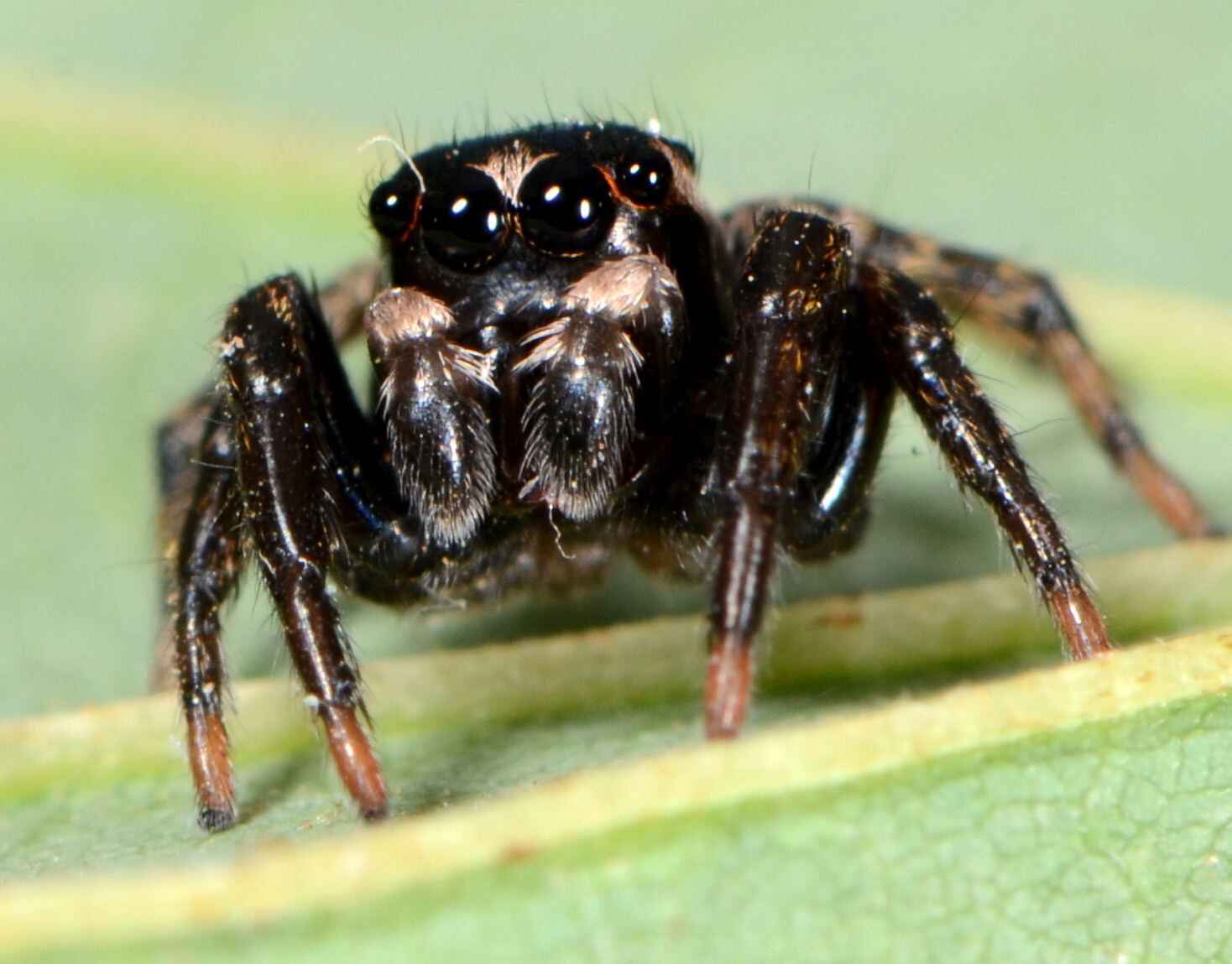
male R. laxus

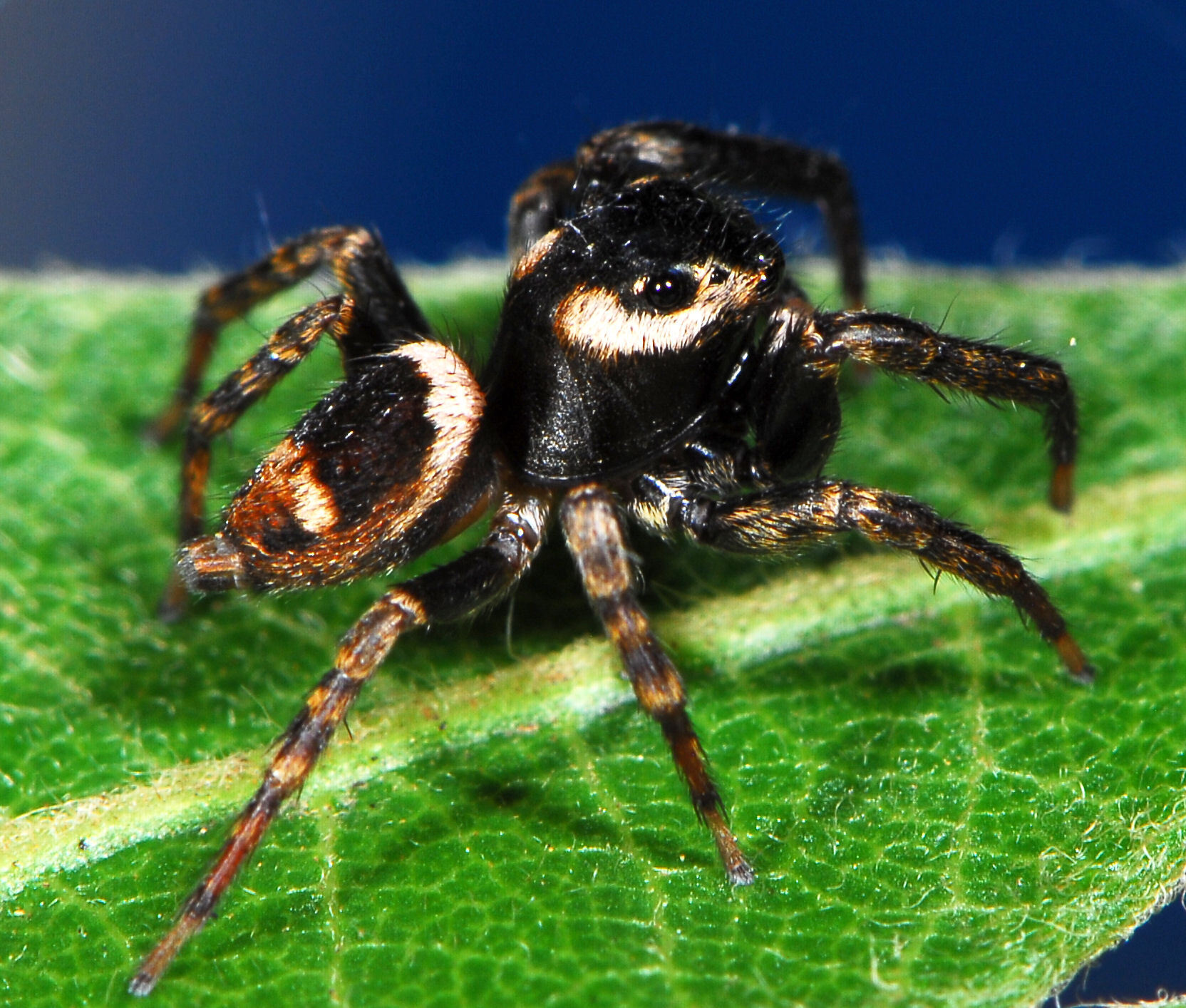
male R. laxus

== Species ==
As of October 2025, this genus includes seven species:

- Rumburak bellus Wesołowska, Azarkina & Russell-Smith, 2014
- Rumburak hilaris Wesołowska, Azarkina & Russell-Smith, 2014
- Rumburak lateripunctatus Wesołowska, Azarkina & Russell-Smith, 2014 (type species)
- Rumburak laxus (Zhang & Maddison, 2012)
- Rumburak mirabilis Wesołowska, Azarkina & Russell-Smith, 2014
- Rumburak tuberatus Wesołowska, Azarkina & Russell-Smith, 2014
- Rumburak virilis Wesołowska, Azarkina & Russell-Smith, 2014
