= Tanzania meridionalis =

Scientific classification
- Kingdom: Animalia
- Phylum: Arthropoda
- Subphylum: Chelicerata
- Class: Arachnida
- Order: Araneae
- Infraorder: Araneomorphae
- Family: Salticidae
- Genus: Tanzania
- Species: T. meridionalis

Binomial name
- Tanzania meridionalis Haddad & Wesołowska, 2011

Species of spider

Tanzania meridionalis is a species of jumping spider in the genus Tanzania that lives in South Africa. First described in 2011 by Charles Haddad and Wanda Wesołowska, it is a small spider, with a carapace between 0.8 and 0.9 mm (0.03 and 0.04 in) long and an abdomen between 0.8 and 0.9 mm (0.03 and 0.04 in) long. The top of the spider is generally light brown with a black eye field and a pattern of stripes and streaks. The underside is lighter. It has a single thin long hair in the middle of its face, or clypeus. The male has distinctive copulatory organs with a very short colled embolus. The female has not been described.

== Taxonomy ==
Tanzania meridionalis is a species of jumping spider that was first described by Charles Haddad and Wanda Wesołowska in 2011. It was one of over 500 species that the Polish arachnologist Wesołowska identified during her career, making her one of the most prolific in the field. They allocated it to the genus Tanzania, first circumscribed by A. Ö. Koçak & M. Kemal in 2008. The spider was the first to be described as a new member of the genus rather than transferred. Spiders in the genus, which had previously been named Lilliput by Wesolowska and Anthony Russell-Smith in 2000 after the nation in Gulliver's Travels, are related to Euophrys and Talavera. The genus had been renamed as it was already held by a genus of beetle.

In Wayne Maddison's 2015 study of spider phylogenetic classification, the genus Tanzania was placed in the tribe Euophryini This is a member of the clade Saltafresia. Junxia Zhang and Maddison speculated that it may be in a clade with Thyenula. Jerzy Prószyński placed the genus in an informal group called euophryines in 2017. The species is named for the Latin word meridionalis, which means southern and refers to the fact that the spider had a more southerly distribution than other members of the genus discovered at the time.

== Description ==
Tanzania meridionalis is a small spider, typical for the genus. The male has a medium high, light brown carapace that ranges between 0.8 and 0.9 mm (0.03 and 0.04 in) long and is typically 0.6 mm (0.02 in) wide. It is covered in very light hairs and has a pattern consisting of a darker stripe down the middle and two streaks towards the rear on the top. The eye field is short and black with a few white hairs to the front of the eyes. The underside, or sternum, is yellow with darker edges. The spider's face or clypeus is very low and has a single thin long hair in the middle. The mouthparts are distinctive with yellowish chelicerae, labium and maxillae.

The male spider's abdomen is similar in size to its carapace, measuring between 0.8 and 0.9 mm (0.03 and 0.04 in) in length and having a width of between 0.6 and 0.7 mm (0.02 and 0.03 in). It is an ovoid that has a pattern of wave-like streaks that cross it, further apart to the front and closer to the rear. The topside of the abdomen has a covering of fine long, brown and whitish hairs. The underside is pale. The spider has yellow spinnerets. The spider's legs are generally dark yellow with brown rings, although the first pair are darker. They all have long brown hairs. The spider's copulatory organs are very distinctive. The pedipalps are large and orange. The palpal bulb is oval with a large bump towards the bottom. The seminal duct meanders inside it. It has a very short colled embolus. The small size of its embolus is a key distinguishing feature for the species. The female is not yet described.

== Distribution and habitat ==
Initially all Tanzania spiders were identified in Tanzania. The genus is now considered to live across tropical Africa. Tanzania meridionalis is endemic to South Africa. Since the discovery of this species, the related Tanzania minutus, Tanzania mkomaziensis, Tanzania parvulus and Tanzania striatus have also been found in the country. The holotype for Tanzania meridionalis was found in the Erfenis Dam Nature Reserve in Free State in 2005. Other examples have been seen in the local area. The spider thrives in grassland.
