= Tanzania yellapragadai =

Scientific classification
- Kingdom: Animalia
- Phylum: Arthropoda
- Subphylum: Chelicerata
- Class: Arachnida
- Order: Araneae
- Infraorder: Araneomorphae
- Family: Salticidae
- Genus: Tanzania
- Species: T. yellapragadai

Binomial name
- Tanzania yellapragadai Prajapati & Dudhatra, 2022

Species of jumping spider

Tanzania yellapragadai is a species of jumping spider that lives in India. The first member of the genus Tanzania to be found in Asia, it lives at the edge of the thorny shrubland known as the Khirasara vidi found in Gujarat. The spider is small, with a total body length between 1.29 and 1.42 mm (0.05 and 0.06 in). The male is smaller than the female. It has a distinctive pattern on its oval abdomen consisting of two whitish patches and a whitish line. The female has a more noticeable pattern of pale yellowish spots and a mosaic texture towards its rear. The majority of the spider's legs are black but some have yellow segments. Apart from the pattern on its abdomen, it is hard to distinguish from other spiders in the genus unless its copulatory organs are compared. The male has a coiled embolus that is shorter and has a wider base than other species. The female has a ridges on its epigyne, the visible external part of its copulatory organs, that are separated, unlike the otherwise similar Tanzania mkomaziensis, and, internally, bean-shaped spermathecae, or receptacles.

== Taxonomy and etymology ==
Tanzania yellapragadai is a species of jumping spider, a member of the family Salticidae that was first described by the arachnologists Dhruv A. Prajapati and Ashutosh V. Dudhatra in 2022. They allocated it to the genus Tanzania, first circumscribed by A. Ö. Koçak & M. Kemal in 2008. Spiders in the genus, which had previously been named Lilliput by Wesolowska and Anthony Russell-Smith in 2000 after the nation in Gulliver's Travels, are related to Euophrys and Talavera. The genus had been renamed as the name was already held by a genus of beetle.

In Wayne Maddison's 2015 study of spider phylogenetic classification, the genus Tanzania was placed in the tribe Euophryini This is a member of the clade Saltafresia. Junxia Zhang and Maddison speculated that it may be in a clade with Thyenula. Jerzy Prószyński placed the genus in an informal group called euophryines in 2017. The species is named in honour of the biochemist Yellapragada Subbarow.

== Description ==
Tanzania meridionalis is a small spider, typical for the genus. The male is typically 1.29 mm (0.05 in) in total body length. It has a body that consists of two large sections. It has a shiny black pear-shaped carapace, the upperside of its forward section, that is typically 0.68 mm (0.03 in) long, 0.57 mm (0.02 in) wide and 0.37 mm (0.01 in) high. It is covered in scattering of fine blackish hairs, with one long curved hair on the part of its spider's face known as its clypeus. Its mouthparts are distinctive with two teeth at the front of its chelicerae and a single one at the rear.

Situated behind its carapace, the male spider's abdomen is a brownish-black oval that is typically 0.61 mm (0.02 in) long, 0.53 mm (0.02 in) wide and 0.34 mm (0.01 in) high. There is also a covering of fine long hairs on the topside of the abdomen. These are mainly reddish-brown and blackish, but there is a pattern of two patches and a line made of whitish hairs. The pattern helps distinguish the species from the related Tanzania mkomaziensis. There are also between three and four depressions at the back of its abdomen and a bunch of bright whitish hairs above the spider's blackish spinnerets. The spider has distinctive legs. The front two pairs of legs are plain iridescent black. Its remaining legs are black with yellow segments, including what look like yellow socks.

The spider's copulatory organs are distinctive. Its pedipalps are black and end with a smooth cymbium, which, along with the palpal tibia are covered in fine white hairs. Its palpal bulb has a slightly bulbous shape and contains a winding sperm duct meandering inside it. At the top of the bulb is a short coiled embolus. The broad base and small size of its embolus is a key distinguishing feature for the species.

Despite being larger, typically 14.2 mm (0.56 in) in total body length, the female spider is generally otherwise similar to the male in shape. Its carapace is dark brown rather than black as well as being larger overall, measuring typically 0.76 mm (0.03 in) in length, 0.66 mm (0.03 in) in width and 0.42 mm (0.02 in) in height. It is covered in fine white hairs. Its chelicerae are brownish. Its oval abdomen is typically 0.87 mm (0.03 in) long, 0.74 mm (0.03 in) wide and 0.45 mm (0.02 in) high. It is brownish and has a pale yellowish pattern consisting of spots towards the middle of its surface and a mosaic texture towards the rear. The sides of its abdomen are yellowish.

The female's epigyne, the visible external part of its copulatory organs, has two copulatory openings that are separated by spiral ridges. The openings lead through a simple copulatory duct to bean-shaped spermathecae, or receptacles. Unlike the related Tanzania mkomaziensis, the spider's epigynal ridges are separated. Its spermathecae are also different in shape, the other species being more oval. The female's legs are all dark-brownish and have smaller socks.

== Distribution and habitat ==
Initially all Tanzania spiders were identified in Tanzania. The genus was then considered to live across tropical Africa. Tanzania meridionalis is the first of the species to be found in Asia. The holotype was found in and around Rajkot, in the western Indian state of Gujarat. The spider is endemic to India. It lives in plant litter in the grassland found on the edge of the thorny shrubland known as the Khirasara vidi. The climate is hot and semi-arid. The area is used of livestock grazing by pastoral communities.
