= Tanzania pusillus =

Scientific classification
- Kingdom: Animalia
- Phylum: Arthropoda
- Subphylum: Chelicerata
- Class: Arachnida
- Order: Araneae
- Infraorder: Araneomorphae
- Family: Salticidae
- Genus: Tanzania
- Species: T. pusillus

Binomial name
- Tanzania pusillus (Wesołowska & Russell-Smith, 2000)

Species of spider

Tanzania pusillus is a species of jumping spider in the genus Tanzania that lives in the country Tanzania. First described in 2000 by Wanda Wesołowska and Anthony Russell-Smith, the species was originally known as Lilliput pusillus but was renamed in 2008. it is a very small spider, which is recalled in its species name, a Latin word meaning diminutive, with a carapace and abdomen between 0.8 and 0.9 mm (0.03 and 0.04 in) long. The spider is generally yellow apart from the dark brown eye field and grey top to its abdomen. The spider's legs are also yellow with black rings around their different segments. Its pedipalps are yellow and spinnerets are grey.The male has distinctive copulatory organs with a distinctive embolus that is shaped like a corkscrew. The female has not been described.

== Taxonomy and etymology ==
Tanzania pusillus is a species of jumping spider, a member of the family Salticidae, that was first described by Wanda Wesołowska and Anthony Russell-Smith in 2000. It was one of over 500 species that the Polish arachnologist Wesołowska identified during her career.

They allocated it to the genus Lilliput, first circumscribed by Wesolowska and Anthony Russell-Smith in 2000 after the nation in Gulliver's Travels. The genus was renamed Tanzania by Ahmet Ö. Koçak and Muhabbet Kemalin in 2008 as the name Lilliput was already held by a genus of beetle. The name relates to the species distribution. The species is named for the Latin word that can be translated diminutive.

Spiders in the genus are related to Euophrys and Talavera. In Wayne Maddison's 2015 study of spider phylogenetic classification, the genus Tanzania was placed in the tribe Euophryini This is a member of the clade Saltafresia. Junxia Zhang and Maddison speculated that it may be in a clade with Thyenula. Jerzy Prószyński placed the genus in an informal group called euophryines in 2017.

== Description ==
Tanzania pusillus is a very small spider. It has a body divided into two main parts: a cephalothorax and an abdomen. The male has a high, yellow carapace, the hard upper part of the cephalothorax that is between 0.8 and 0.9 mm (0.03 and 0.04 in) in length and is typically 0.6 mm (0.02 in) wide. It is covered in delicate hairs and has an indistinct brown stripe running down its middle. The eye field is dark brown. The underside, or sternum, is yellow. The mouthparts are distinctive with yellow chelicerae, labium and maxillae.

The male spider's abdomen is similar in size to its carapace, measuring between 0.8 and 0.9 mm in length and having a similar width of 0.6 mm. It is greyish on top and yellowish underneath with long brown hairs. The abdomen has a vague darker pattern that is reminiscent of that on the related Tanzania mkomaziensis. The spider has grey spinnerets and whitish-yellow legs that have brown rings around the bottom of each leg segment. The pedipalps, sensory organs near the mouth, are yellow.

The spider's copulatory organs are very distinctive, particularly the shape of the male embolus. The spider has a rounded cymbium that encases its palpal bulb, which is irregular in shape and is almost as large as the cymbium. The seminal duct meanders inside it. The palpal bulb has a distinctively-shaped corkscrew embolus projecting from the top. The female has not been described.

== Distribution ==
Initially all Tanzania spiders were identified living in the country Tanzania. The genus is now considered to live across tropical Africa. Tanzania pusillus is endemic to Tanzania. The holotype was found in Mkomazi National Park in 1994 along with other examples.
