= Yellapragada Subbarow =

Indian-American biochemist (1895–1948)

- యల్లాప్రగడ సుబ్బారావు
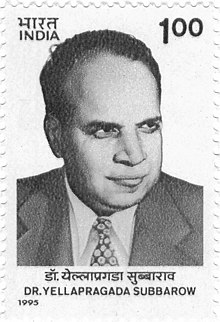
- Commemorative postage stamp celebrating Subbarow's birth centenary
- Born: 12 January 1895; Bhimavaram, Madras Presidency, British India (now in Andhra Pradesh, India)
- Died: 8 August 1948 (aged 53); New York City, United States
- Education: Harvard Medical School; Madras Medical College
- Known for: Discovering the role of phosphocreatine and adenosine triphosphate in muscular activity; synthesis of folic acid; synthesis of methotrexate; discovery of diethylcarbamazine
- Scientific career
- Fields: Biochemistry
- Workplaces: Lederle Laboratories, a division of American Cyanamid (Acquired by Wyeth in 1994, now Pfizer)

Yellapragada Subbarao (Note: Alternatively spelled as SubbaRow, Subbarao or Subba Rao.) (Telugu: యల్లాప్రగడ సుబ్బారావు, romanized: Yallāpragaḍa Subbārāvu; 12 January 1895 – 8 August 1948) was an Indian American biochemist who discovered the function of adenosine triphosphate (ATP) as an energy source in the cell, developed methotrexate for the treatment of cancer, and led the department at Lederle laboratories in which Benjamin Minge Duggar discovered chlortetracycline in 1945.

A student of Madras Medical College, his elder brother and younger brother both died due to tropical sprue in the span of eight days. He subsequently discovered folic acid as a cure for tropical sprue. He discovered methotrexate, a chemotherapy drug still used today and also used for rheumatoid arthritis, and diethylcarbamazine (DEC), the only effective drug for treating filariasis. Most of his career was spent in the United States. Despite his isolation of ATP, Subbaroa did not gain tenure at Harvard University though he would lead some of America's most important medical research during World War II. He is also credited with the first synthesis of the chemical compounds folic acid and methotrexate.

== Early life and education ==
The surname Yellapragada is associated with descent from Yellanna, who served as a minister at the court of the Nawab of Golconda during the 17th century. Members of the Yellapragada family subsequently worked as revenue accountants under successive Indian rulers until the 19th century. The family's circumstances began to deteriorate after Subbarow's grandfather, Subbaraju, died, leaving his position as an accountant inadequate to support the expanding joint family.

Yellapragada Subbarow was born in rural India on 12 January 1895 and later pursued medical studies at Madras Medical College in Chennai. His involvement with the Indian independence movement contributed to his being awarded the Licentiate of Medicine and Surgery (LMS) rather than the full Bachelor of Medicine and Bachelor of Surgery (MBBS) qualification. Because the LMS did not qualify him for the same opportunities as an MBBS graduate, he joined Madras Ayurvedic College as a lecturer in anatomy and physiology and later rose to become its vice principal.

During his bachelor college years, he experienced a serious episode of diarrhoea that did not respond to allopathic treatment but was followed by recovery after receiving Ayurvedic treatment. The experience deepened his interest in Ayurveda and encouraged his belief that Ayurvedic approaches could be combined with allopathic medicine. During his time at Madras Ayurvedic College, he prepared a 427-page manuscript concerning the vegetable drugs of North India as described in the writings of prominent Ayurvedic authorities.

A chance encounter with American physician John Fox Kendrick subsequently encouraged him to seek further training at the Harvard School of Tropical Medicine. Facing financial constraints, he supported himself through part-time work, as his LMS qualification did not make him eligible for a scholarship or internship. After obtaining his diploma from the Harvard School of Tropical Medicine, he entered Harvard Medical School in 1924.

== Career ==
After earning a diploma from the Harvard Medical School he joined Harvard as a junior faculty member. With Cyrus Fiske, he developed a method for the estimation of phosphorus in body fluids and tissues called the Fiske-Subbarao Method. He also discovered the role of phosphocreatine and adenosine triphosphate (ATP) in muscular activity, which earned him an entry in biochemistry textbooks in the 1930s. He obtained his Ph.D. degree the same year. He joined Lederle Laboratories, a division of American Cyanamid (now a division of Wyeth which is owned by Pfizer), after he failed to gain a regular faculty position at Harvard.

At Lederle, he developed a method to synthesize folic acid, Vitamin B_{9}, based on work by Lucy Wills to isolate folic acid as a protective agent against anemia. After his work on folic acid and with considerable input from Dr. Sidney Farber, he developed the important anti-cancer drug methotrexate – one of the first cancer chemotherapy agents and still in widespread clinical use. Subbarao also discovered the basis for the anthelmintic diethylcarbamazine (Hetrazan), which was later recommended by the World Health Organization as a treatment for filariasis.

Under Subbarao, Benjamin Duggar made his discovery of the world's first tetracycline antibiotic, chlortetracycline, in 1945. Duggar identified the antibiotic as the product of an actinomycete he cultured from a soil sample collected from Sanborn Field at the University of Missouri. The medicine was first used at the Harlem Hospital in New York and it found good success. Ironically enough, the medicine looked so promising that some people decided to break into the Boston medicine warehouse and steal it.

== Death ==
Subbarao died on 8 August 1948 in New York due to cardiac arrest.

== Legacy ==
A contemporary of Subbarao, Cyrus H. Fiske, suppressed and destroyed many of his important works out of envy. Subbarao's colleague George Hitchings admitted, "Some of the nucleotides isolated by Subbarao had to be rediscovered years later by other workers because Fiske, apparently out of jealousy, did not let Subbarao's contributions see the light of the day." A fungus genus has been named Subbaromyces in his honour. There is also a species of jumping spider (Family Salticidae) from genus Tanzania named in his honor (Tanzania yellapragadai). Writing in the April 1950 issue of Argosy, Doron K. Antrim observed, "You've probably never heard of Dr. Yellapragada Subbarao. Yet because he lived, you may be alive and are well today. Because he lived, you may live longer."

Currently a street is named after him in his hometown Bhimavaram.
