= Tanzania minutus =

Scientific classification
- Kingdom: Animalia
- Phylum: Arthropoda
- Subphylum: Chelicerata
- Class: Arachnida
- Order: Araneae
- Infraorder: Araneomorphae
- Family: Salticidae
- Genus: Tanzania
- Species: T. minutus

Binomial name
- Tanzania minutus (Wesołowska & Russell-Smith, 2000)

Species of spider

Tanzania minutus is a species of jumping spider in the genus Tanzania that lives in South Africa and Tanzania. First described in 2000 by Wanda Wesołowska and Anthony Russell-Smith, it is a very small spider, which is recalled in its species name, a Latin word meaning small, with a carapace typically 0.8 mm (0.03 in) long and an abdomen between 0.8 and 0.9 mm (0.04 in) long. The spider is generally yellow with a brown patch in the middle of the carapace and a narrow stripe running down the top of the abdomen apart from the black eye field. The spider's legs are also yellow with black patches. Its pedipalps are orange and its spinnerets are darker, nearly black. The male has distinctive copulatory organs with a very short coiled embolus. The female has not been described.

== Taxonomy and etymology ==
Tanzania minutus is a species of jumping spider, a member of the family Salticidae, that was first described by the arachnologists Wanda Wesołowska and Anthony Russell-Smith in 2000. It was one of over 500 species that Wesołowska identified during her career.

Wesołowska and Russell-Smith initially allocated the spider to the genus Lilliput, circumscribed at the same time by the same authors and named after the nation in the novel Gulliver's Travels. The genus was subsequently renamed Tanzania by Ahmet Ö. Koçak and Muhabbet Kemalin in 2008 as the name Lilliput was already held by a genus of beetle. The new genus name relates to the species distribution. The species is named for the Latin word minutus, that can be translated little.

In Wayne Maddison's 2015 study of spider phylogenetic classification, the genus Tanzania was placed in the tribe Euophryini This is a member of the clade Saltafresia. Spiders in the genus are related to Euophrys and Talavera. Junxia Zhang and Maddison speculated that it may be in a clade with Thyenula in 2015 but the relationship has not been confirmed. In 2017, Jerzy Prószyński placed the genus in an informal group called euophryines.

== Description ==
Tanzania minutus is a very small spider. It has a body divided into two main parts: a cephalothorax and an abdomen. The male has a high, yellowish carapace, the hard upper part of the cephalothorax, that is typically 0.8 mm (0.03 in) long and is typically 0.6 mm (0.02 in) wide. It is covered in long thin grey hairs and has a pattern consisting of a brown patch in the middle and a brown line along its sides. The eye field is black with a metallic lustre and very small light scales around some of the eyes. The underside, or sternum, is yellow. The mouthparts are distinctive with yellow chelicerae, labium and maxillae.

The male spider's abdomen is similar in size to its carapace, measuring between 0.8 and 0.9 mm (0.04 in) in length and having a similar width of 0.6 mm. It is similarly yellow on top, with a dark narrow stripe running down the middle. The topside of the abdomen is covered in long thin brown hairs and has a delicate scutum visible in the middle. The underside is yellowish. The spider has dark, nearly black spinnerets. The spider's legs are generally yellow with black patches. They all have long brown hairs and brown spines. The pedipalps, sensory organs near the mouth, are orange.

The spider's copulatory organs are very distinctive, particularly the shape of the male embolus. The spider has a rounded cymbium that encases its palpal bulb, which is irregular in shape and is almost as large as the cymbium. A single seminal duct meanders inside it. It has a very short tightly-coiled embolus projecting from the top. The female is not been described.

== Distribution and habitat ==
Initially all Tanzania spiders were identified in Tanzania. The holotype for Tanzania minutus was found in Mkomazi National Park in 1996. Along with the related Tanzania mkomaziensis, the species has also been found in South Africa. This discovery is one of the reasons that the genus is now considered to live across tropical Africa. It lives in bushland dominated by plant species of the genera Acacia and Commiphora.
