= Talavera thorelli =

Scientific classification
- Kingdom: Animalia
- Phylum: Arthropoda
- Subphylum: Chelicerata
- Class: Arachnida
- Order: Araneae
- Infraorder: Araneomorphae
- Family: Salticidae
- Genus: Talavera
- Species: T. thorelli

Binomial name
- Talavera thorelli (Kulczyński, 1891)

Species of spider

Talavera thorelli is a spider in the group of jumping spiders (Salticidae). They usually hunt on the pedosphere, they do not spin webs.

== Description ==
Talavera thorelli is, along with the other species in the genus, relatively small - and many are fairly similar to one another, as they can be different colours. For accurate identification, there must be close examination of the sex organs of the mature spider, the female epigyne and the male pedipalps on the last joints.

The body is divided into an abdomen and a front part of the body (prosoma or cephalothorax). The head has eight eyes, two unusually large at the front and centre, and two smaller on the sides. The other four eyes are on the side of the head. Jumping spiders are unique in that they can focus their gaze to some extent.

== Literature ==
- W. Nentwig, A. Hänggi, C. Kropf & T. Blick (Hrsg.): Spinnen Mitteleuropas – Bestimmungsschlüssel, slekten (gattung) Talavera (German)
