= Tanzania striatus =

Conservation status
- Least Concern (IUCN 3.1)

Scientific classification
- Kingdom: Animalia
- Phylum: Arthropoda
- Subphylum: Chelicerata
- Class: Arachnida
- Order: Araneae
- Infraorder: Araneomorphae
- Family: Salticidae
- Genus: Tanzania
- Species: T. striatus

Binomial name
- Tanzania striatus Wesołowska, Azarkina & Russell-Smith, 2014

Species of jumping spider

The Table Mountain Tanzania Jumping Spider (Tanzania striatus) is a species of jumping spider in the genus Tanzania. Endemic to South Africa, the species lives in Cape Town. It is a very small spider, with a cephalothorax that measures typically 0.9 mm (0.04 in) long and an abdomen that is between 0.8 and 1.3 mm (0.03 and 0.05 in) long, only slightly larger than the related Opathe Tanzania Jumping Spider. The female is larger than the male. The abdomen is marked by a striped pattern of three brown stripes on a yellow background that is the source of its specific name, which is a Latin word that can be translated 'striped'. It is otherwise generally yellow apart from its black eye field. It has distinctive copulatory organs. The male has a short wide embolus that corkscrews out of the top of the oval palpal bulb and ends in a forked tip. The female has a large epigyne and oval spermathecae at the end of short seminal ducts.

== Taxonomy and etymology ==
Tanzania striatus, also known as the Table Mountain Tanzania Jumping Spider, is a species of jumping spider, a member of the family Salticidae. It was first described by Wanda Wesołowska, Galina Azarkina and Anthony Russell-Smith in 2014. They allocated it to the genus Tanzania first circumscribed by Ahmet Ö. Koçak and Muhabbet Kemalin in 2008. The genus was named for the distribution of the then extant member species. It was one of over 500 species identified by the Polish arachnologist Wesołowska during her career. The species is named for a Latin word that can be translated 'striped', and refers to the pattern on its abdomen.

In Wayne Maddison's 2015 study of spider phylogenetic classification, the genus Tanzania was placed in the tribe Euophryini This is a member of the clade Saltafresia. Spiders in the genus are related to Euophrys and Talavera. Junxia Zhang and Maddison speculated that it may be in a clade with Thyenula but that relationship has not been confirmed. In 2017, Jerzy Prószyński placed the genus in an informal group called euophryines.

== Description ==
The Table Mountain Tanzania Jumping Spider is a very small spider with a body divided into two main parts: a rounded rectangular cephalothorax and an oval abdomen. It is only slightly larger than the related Opathe Tanzania Jumping Spider, Tanzania parvulus. It has a cephalothorax that is typically 0.9 mm (0.04 in) long and 0.7 mm (0.03 in) wide. The male carapace, the hard upper part of the cephalothorax, is moderately high with a long flat half that takes up nearly half of the surface and a sharp slope to the rear. It is dark yellow with a brown streak down the middle and small brownish marks on the slope at the back. It is covered in brown and colourless hairs. The eye field is a short and black with long brown bristles near the eyes themselves. The underside of the cephalothorax, or sternum, is yellow with a brown ring around the edges. The spider's clypeus is low with a single protruding hair. The mouthparts, including the labium, are yellowish.

The male's abdomen is smaller than its carapace, measuring typically 0.8 mm (0.03 in) long and 0.6 mm (0.02 in) wide. The top has three brown stripes on a yellow background. Its underside is lighter with thin brown lines along its sides. It has a covering of light hairs, marked with a few long brown bristles. The spider has blackish spinnerets. Its yellow legs have brown rings and hairs while the spines are lighter. It has orange pedipalps. The cymbium is slightly larger than the palpal bulb. Both are oval. There is a meandering sperm duct inside the bulb and a relatively short fat embolus that corkscrews out of the top, ending in a forked tip. It is the larger size of the embolus and this forked tip that help distinguish the spider from the Opathe Tanzania Jumping Spider.

The female has a cephalothorax that is similar in size to the male, but a larger abdomen, typically 1.3 mm (0.05 in) long and 0.9 mm wide. It is a similar in colour to the male as well and is hard to tell apart. The eye field has covered in dense short grey hairs and the foremost eyes have light scales around them. The legs are similarly yellow but have black rings. The copulatory organs are also distinctive. It has a large epigyne that is marked by two rounded depressions. The copulatory openings lead to short seminal ducts and oval spermathecae, or receptacles. There are accessory glands in the walls of the spermathecae.

== Distribution and habitat ==
Initially all Tanzania spiders were identified in Tanzania. The genus is now considered to live across tropical Africa. Tanzania striatus is endemic to South Africa. It has been found only in Cape Town, with the first specimens being found in 2008 in Kirstenbosch National Botanical Garden and Table Mountain National Park. The spider thrives in Afromontane forest, being found amongst leaf litter found in the fynbos of Western Cape.
