= Tanzania (spider) =

Scientific classification
- Kingdom: Animalia
- Phylum: Arthropoda
- Subphylum: Chelicerata
- Class: Arachnida
- Order: Araneae
- Infraorder: Araneomorphae
- Family: Salticidae
- Subfamily: Salticinae
- Genus: Tanzania; Koçak & Kemal, 2008

Type species
- Lilliput mkomaziensis Wesolowska & Russell-Smith, 2000

Species
- 7, see text

Synonyms
- Lilliput Wesolowska & Russell-Smith, 2000

Genus of spiders

Tanzania is a genus of jumping spiders that was first identified in Tanzania, after which it is named, but now is recognised to have a much wider distribution. First circumscribed in 2008, it is a small spider, between 1.5 and 3 millimetres (0.059 and 0.118 in) in length. Its type species is Tanzania mkomaziensis, which was originally described in 2000 with the name Lilliput mkomaziensis. Along with the rest of the spiders in the genus Lilliput, this was moved to Tanzania in 2008. The genus is related to Euophrys and Talavera.

Most spiders in this genus are found in Africa, with T. yellapragadai endemic to India.

== Discovery and distribution ==
Tanzania is a genus of jumping spiders that was first circumscribed by the arachnologists Ahmet Ö. Koçak and Muhabbet Kemalin in 2008. The generic name relates to the species distribution of the then extant member species. The genus was later found across sub-Saharan Africa. This was subsequently extended into Asia. It is likely to have a much greater distribution as its small size and inconspicuous look means that it is often overlooked or dismissed as an immature version of an undeterminable species.

== Description ==
Tanzania spiders are very small, with body lengths ranging from 1.3 to 3 millimetres (0.051 to 0.118 in). The males have a distinctive pattern on their abdomen. Both sexes look alike, but the females are sometimes darker. They both have a very long fine hair on the part of the face known as the clypeus, which is distinctive. Their copulatory organs also differ in their characteristics to those on other spiders. Females have a large epigyne, the external visible part of their copulatory organs, that has spiral flanges around its copulatory openings. The flanges show evidence of sclerotization. Inside, they have large spherical receptacles, or spermathecae. Males have a coiled ribbon-like embolus and lack a tibial apophysis, the spike often found on the palpal tibia of jumoing spiders.

== Taxonomy ==
In Wayne Maddison's 2015 study of spider phylogenetic classification, the genus Tanzania was placed in the tribe Euophryini This is a member of the clade Saltafresia. Spiders in the genus are related to Euophrys and Talavera. Junxia Zhang and Maddison speculated that it may be in a clade with Thyenula but that relationship has not been confirmed. In 2017, Jerzy Prószyński placed the genus in an informal group called euophryines.

Three new species discovered in Tanzania by Wesolowska and Russell-Smith in 2000, and given the genus name Lilliput (L. mkomazienis, L. minutus and L. pusillus) are now included in the genus Tanzania. Lilliput, circumscribed by the authors at the same time, was named after the nation in the novel Gulliver's Travels to signify the small size of the spider. The name Lilliput was already held by a genus of beetle and so the species in the genus were moved to Tanzania.

== Species ==
As of October 2025, this genus includes seven species:

- Tanzania meridionalis Haddad & Wesołowska, 2011 – South Africa
- Tanzania minutus (Wesołowska & Russell-Smith, 2000) – Tanzania, South Africa
- Tanzania mkomaziensis (Wesołowska & Russell-Smith, 2000) – Ivory Coast, Nigeria, Ethiopia, Tanzania, South Africa (type species)
- Tanzania parvulus Wesołowska, Azarkina & Russell-Smith, 2014 – South Africa
- Tanzania pusillus (Wesołowska & Russell-Smith, 2000) – Tanzania
- Tanzania striatus Wesołowska, Azarkina & Russell-Smith, 2014 – South Africa
- Tanzania yellapragadai Prajapati & Dudhatra, 2022 – India
