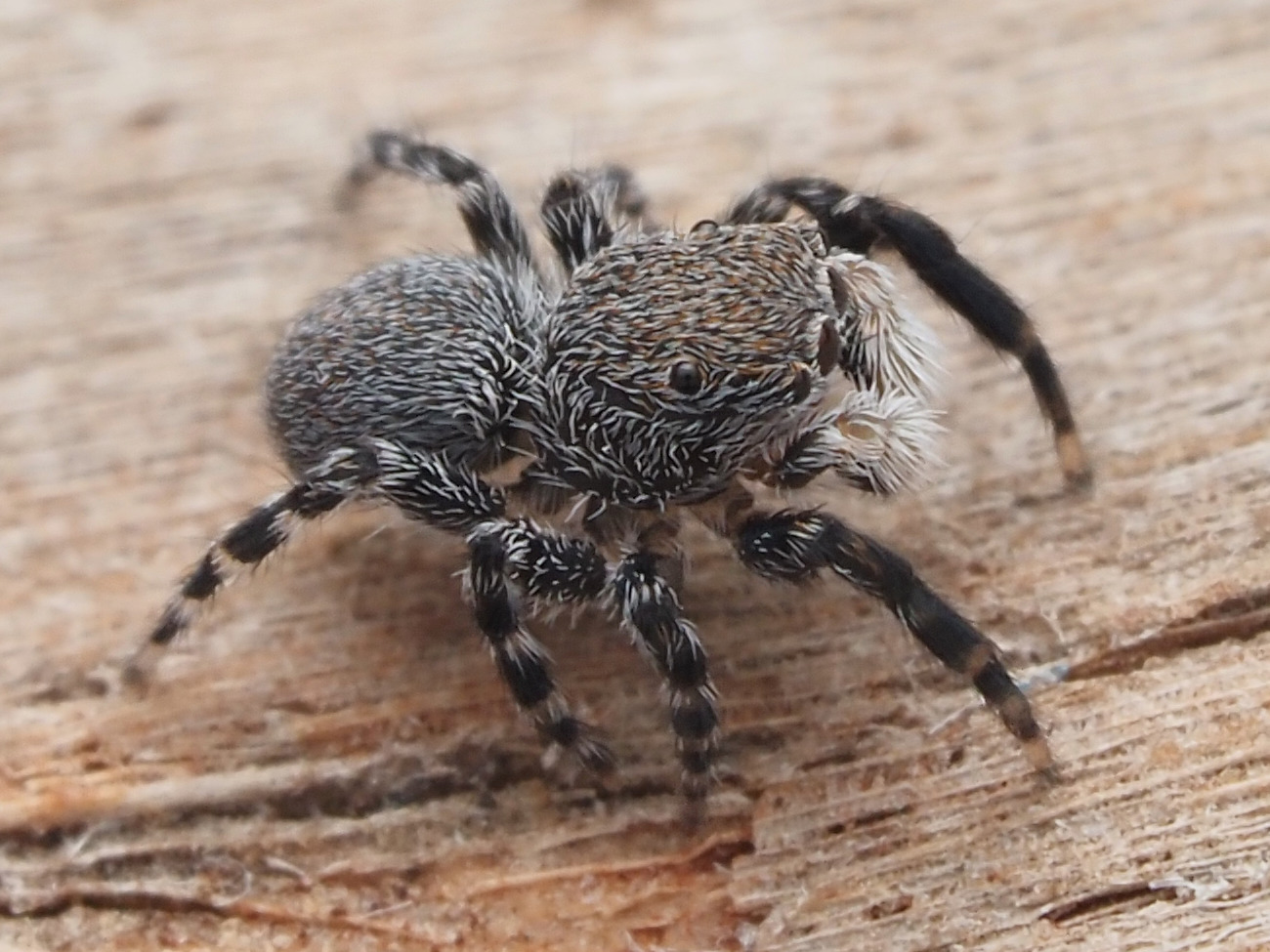
- Male

Scientific classification
- Kingdom: Animalia
- Phylum: Arthropoda
- Subphylum: Chelicerata
- Class: Arachnida
- Order: Araneae
- Infraorder: Araneomorphae
- Family: Salticidae
- Genus: Talavera
- Species: T. minuta

Binomial name
- Talavera minuta (Banks, 1895)

= Talavera minuta =

Species of spider

Talavera minuta is a species of jumping spider. It is found in eastern Russia, Canada, and the United States.

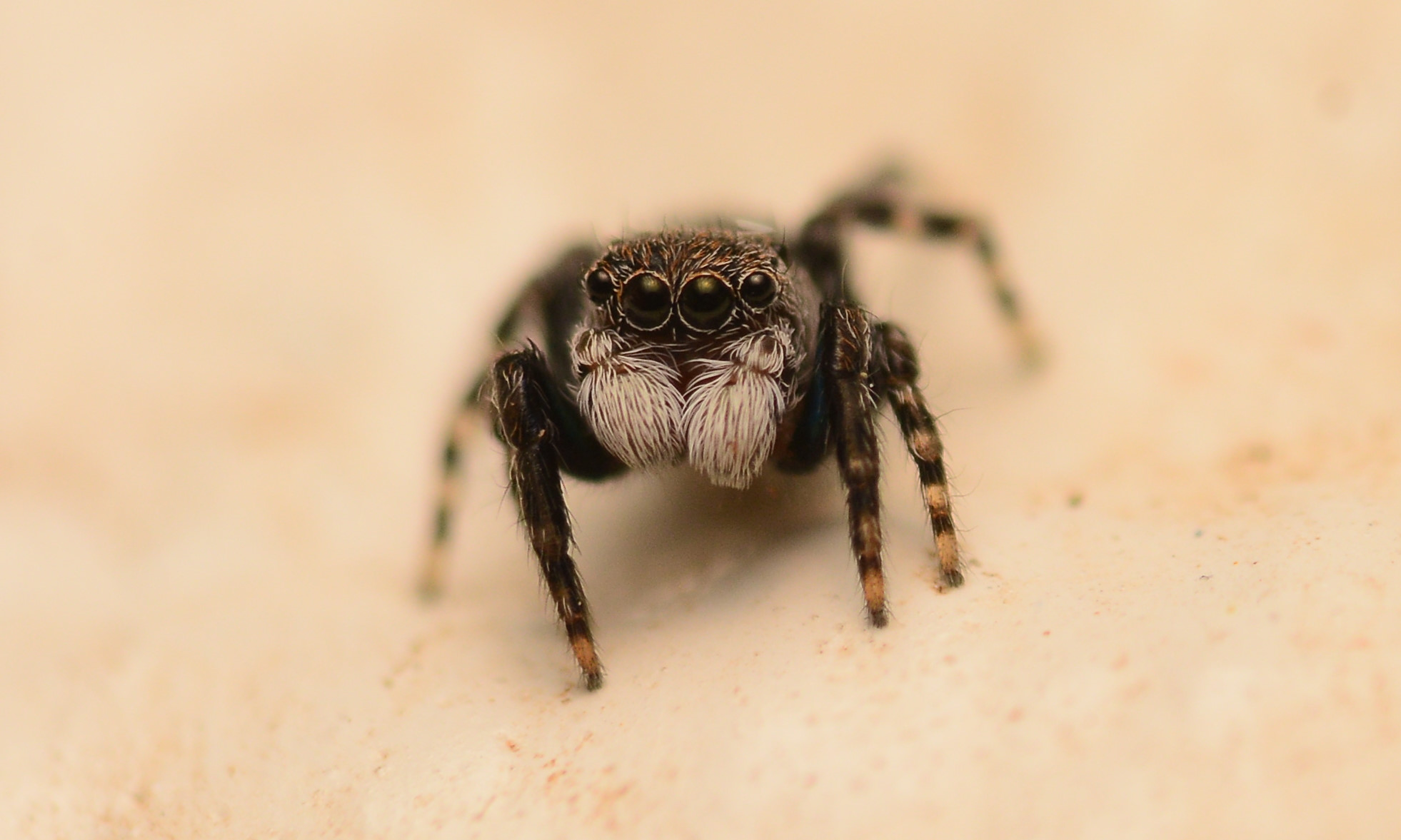
Male face

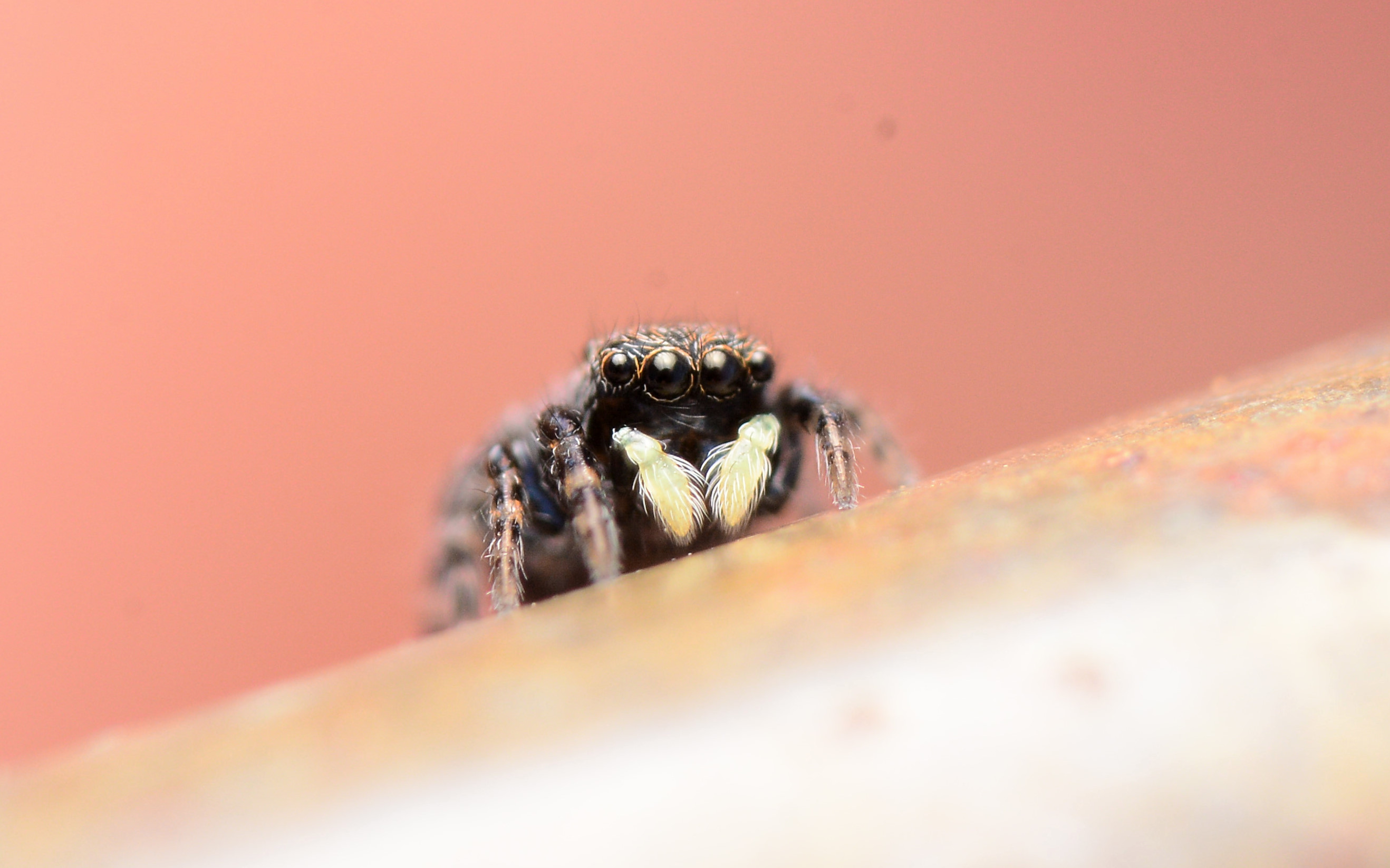
Female face

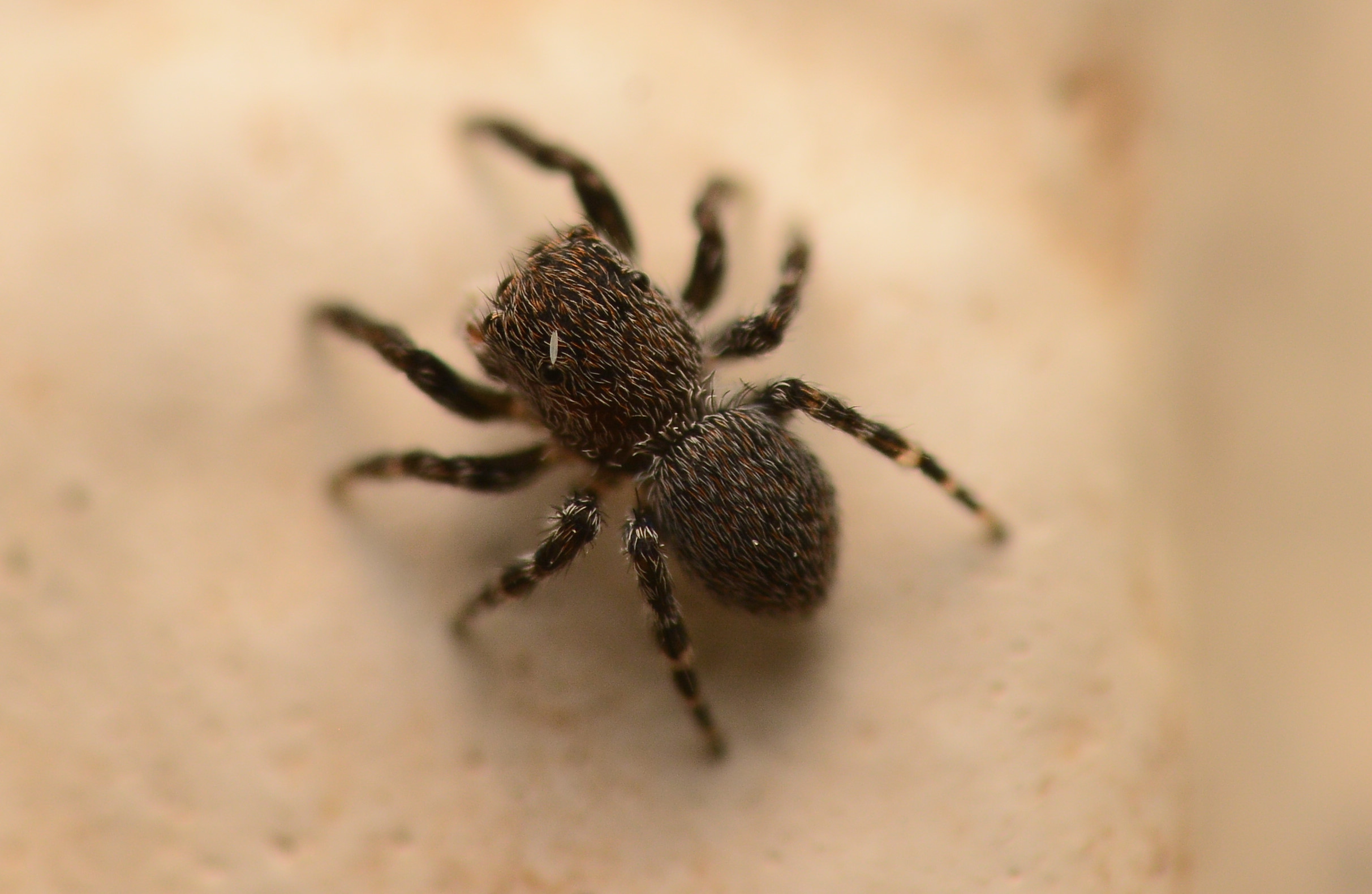
Male dorsal

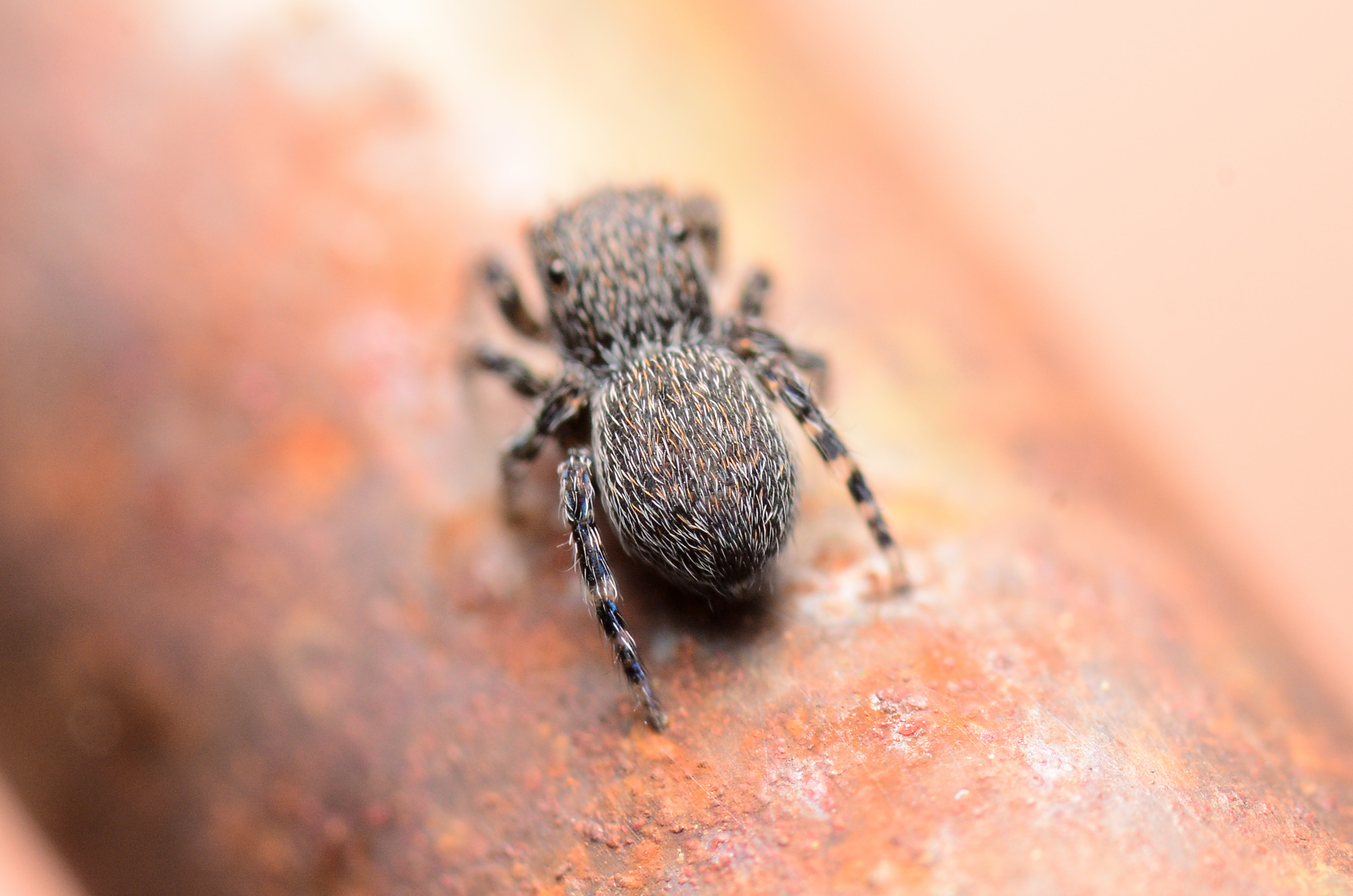
Female dorsal

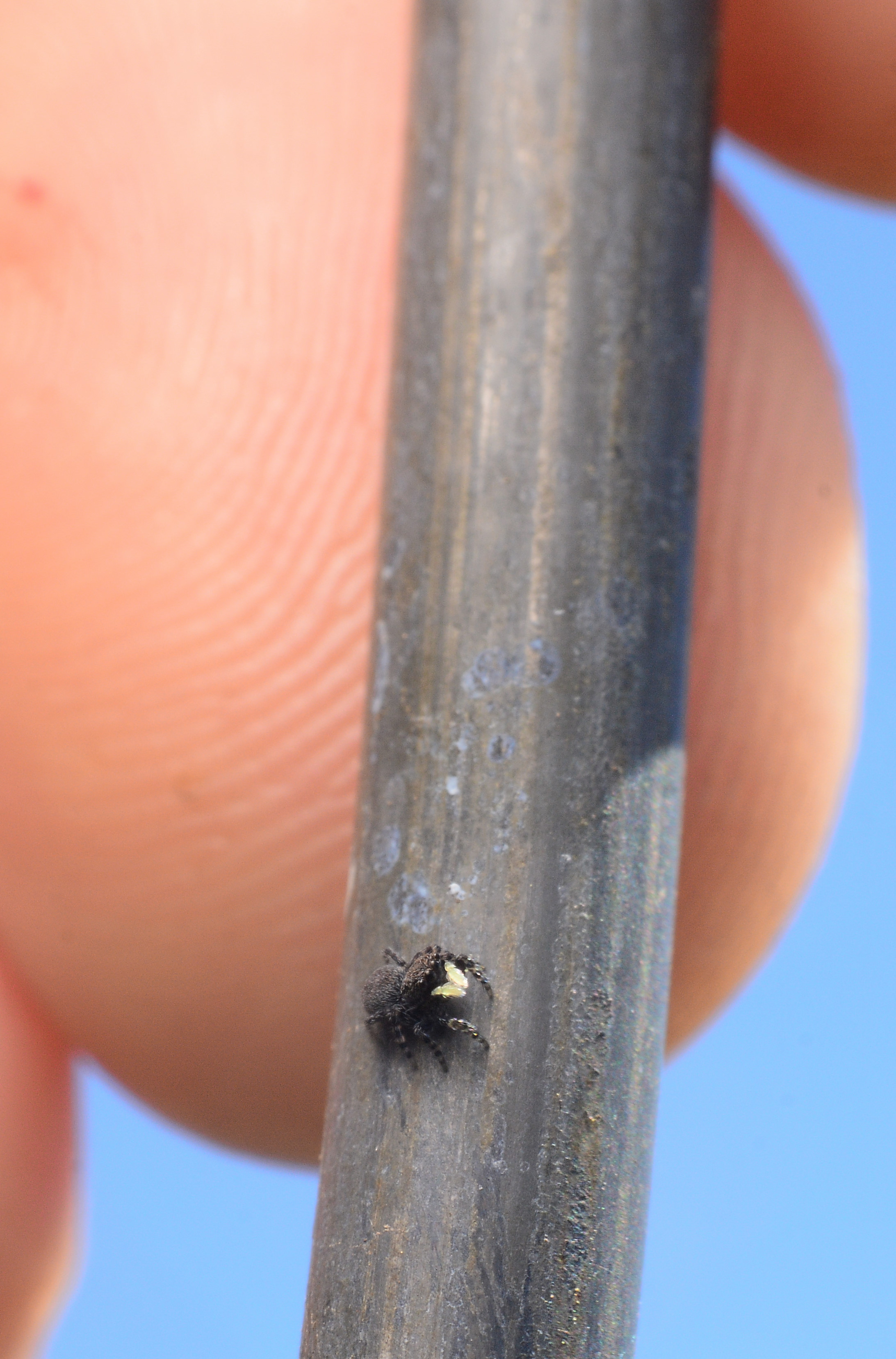
Size reference with tip of finger
