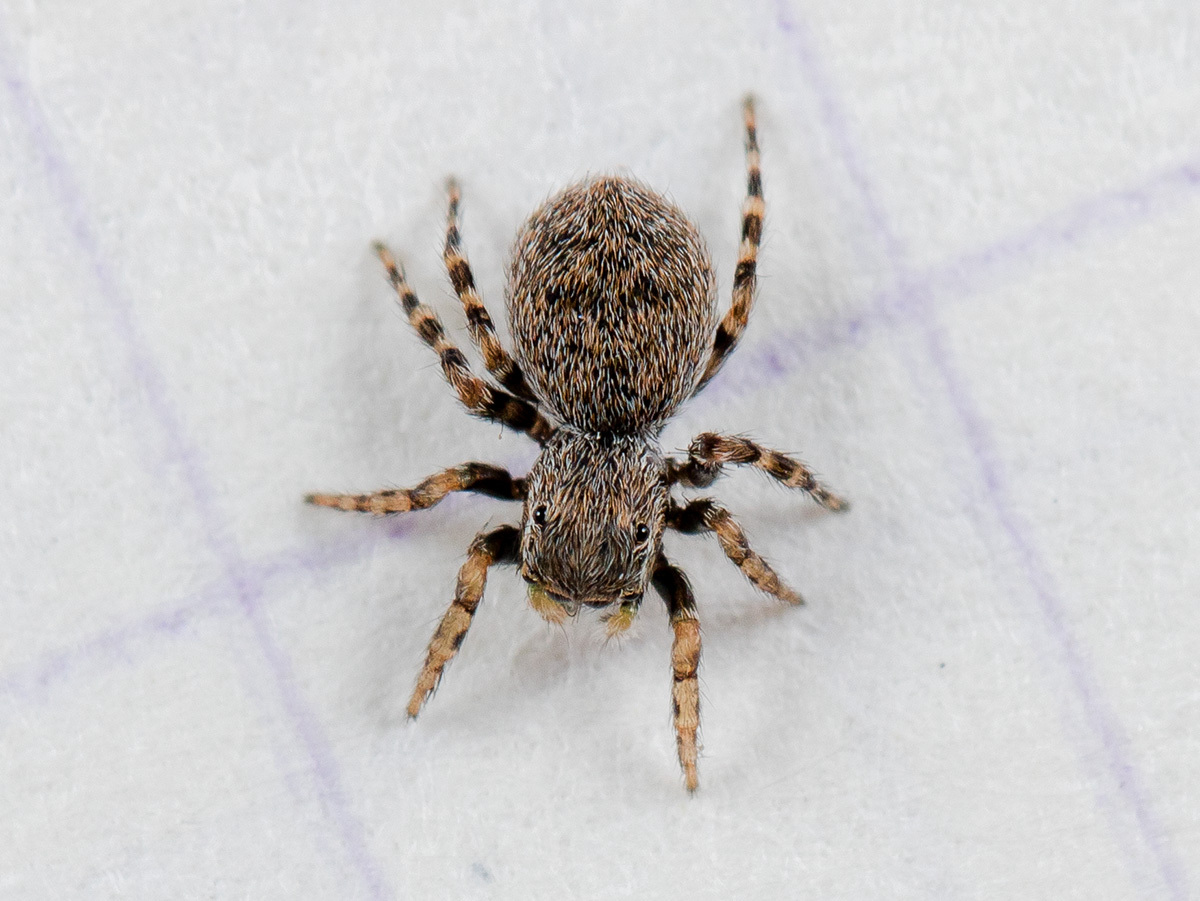
- female from Kazakhstan
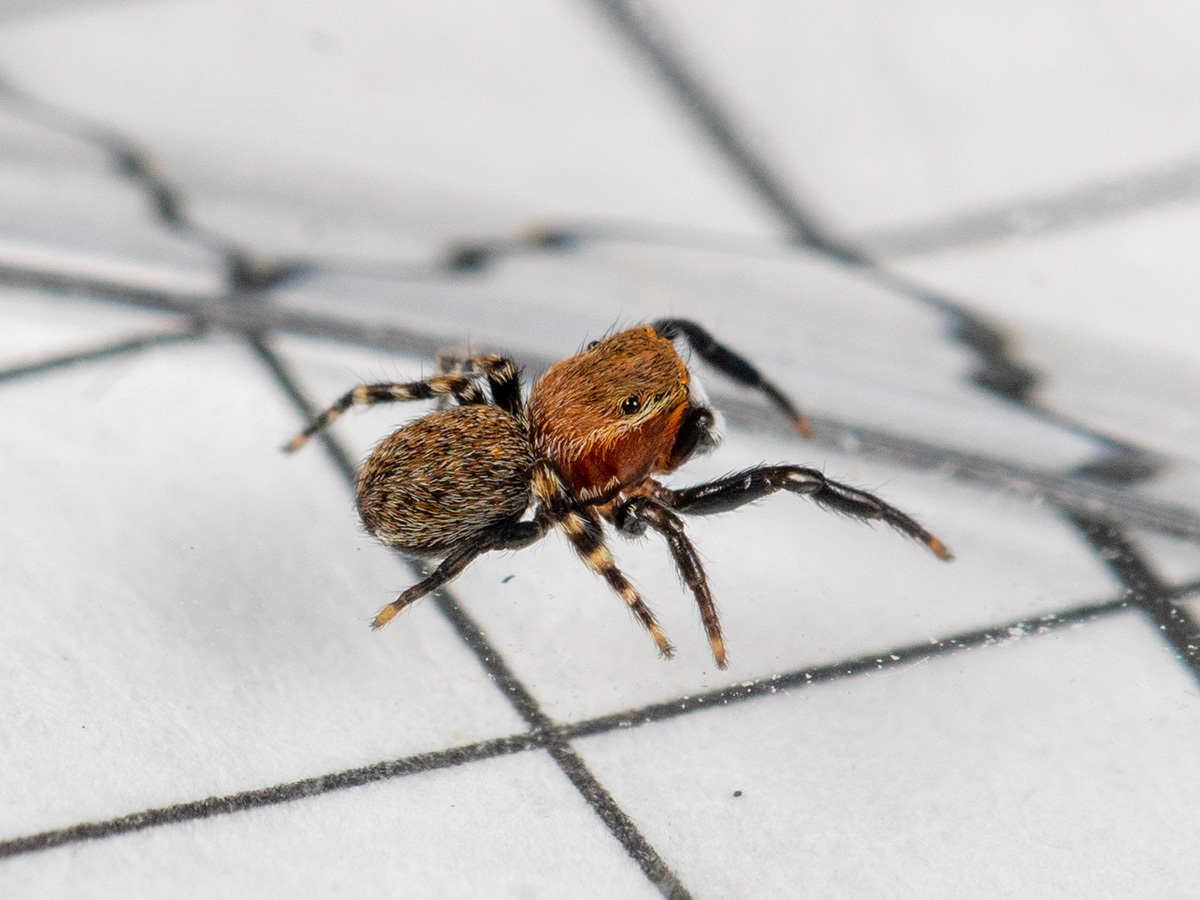
- male from Kazakhstan

Scientific classification
- Kingdom: Animalia
- Phylum: Arthropoda
- Subphylum: Chelicerata
- Class: Arachnida
- Order: Araneae
- Infraorder: Araneomorphae
- Family: Salticidae
- Genus: Talavera
- Species: T. petrensis

Binomial name
- Talavera petrensis (C. L. Koch, 1837)

Synonyms
- Euophrys petrensis C. L. Koch, 1837; Salticus coccociliatus O. Pickard-Cambridge, 1863

= Talavera petrensis =

Species of jumping spider

Talavera petrensis is a species of jumping spider of the genus Talavera. It was first described by Carl Ludwig Koch in 1837 as Euophrys petrensis. The species is widely distributed across Europe to Central Asia and China.

== Etymology ==
The specific name petrensis is derived from the Latin petra, meaning "rock" or "stone", referring to the spider's habitat preference for rocky environments.

== Distribution ==
T. petrensis has been recorded across a vast range from Europe through Central Asia to China. The species has been documented from numerous European countries and extends eastward into Asia. In China, it has been found in Xinjiang province.

== Description ==
female from CL Koch (1848)

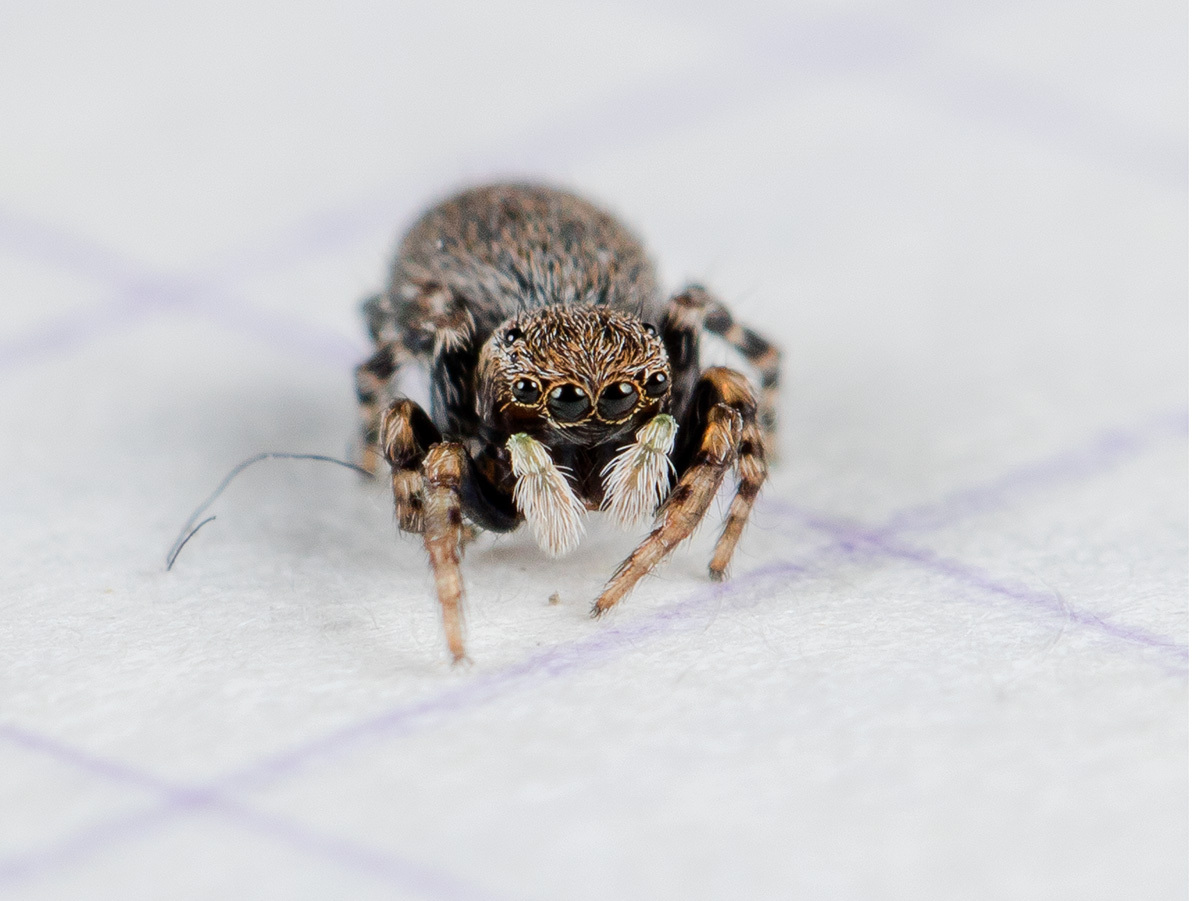
female

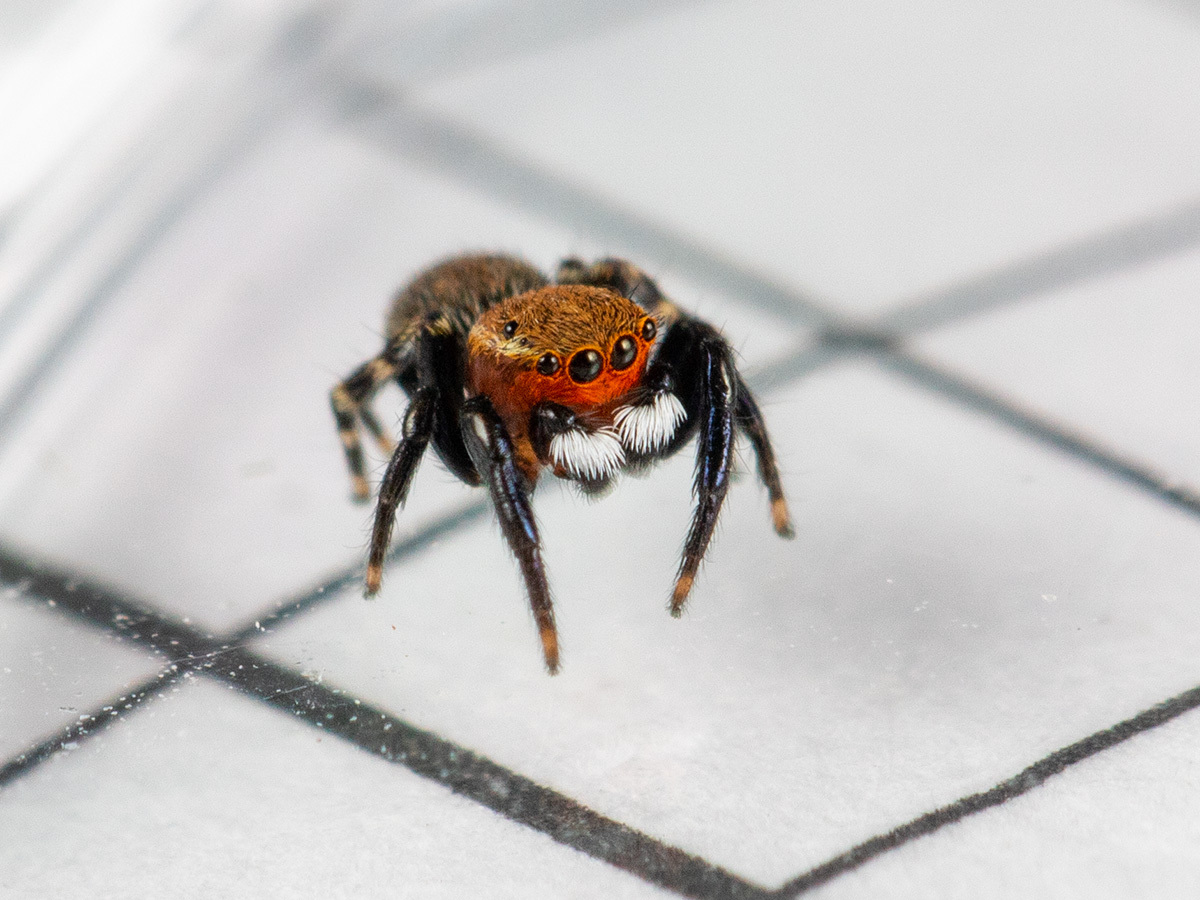
male

=== Females ===
Females have a body length of 3.70-4.10 mm, with the cephalothorax measuring 1.40 mm wide and the opisthosoma 1.40 mm wide. The cephalothorax is brownish with dense white hairs, while the eye region is blackish with a black marginal band and yellowish-brown inner sides. The clypeus is high, brownish with black long hairs. The cephalothorax has an egg-shaped outline with equal length and width, appearing brownish-black with black long hairs. The chelicerae are brownish. The mouthparts and labium are brownish with pale tips and black long hairs. The legs are yellowish-brown with black annular markings. The leg segments have black block-like spots, with specific spine arrangements on different segments.

The opisthosoma is egg-shaped with approximately equal anterior and posterior widths. The dorsum is grayish-black with a sword-shaped cardiac mark followed by 5 black "mountain" (^) shaped markings. Each mountain-shaped marking has a pale circular spot on either side of its anterior edge. The ventral surface is grayish-black with occasionally visible deep longitudinal bands. The spinnerets are blackish.

=== Males ===
Westring (1851) described the males as the thorax measuring only about 1 mm in length. They lack the prominent eye arrangement seen in females, instead having the entire clypeus covered with cinnamon-red, drooping hairs. The mandibles are yellow-red, and the palps are partly black. The femoral-humeral joint is wide at the base, with the cubital and radial joints entirely yellow; this latter joint is clothed with white hairs extending over the base of the lamella. The legs are small and black, with the front tarsi being the largest and reddish-yellow. The patellae have other joints on the 2 posterior pairs partly black, with reddish rings.
