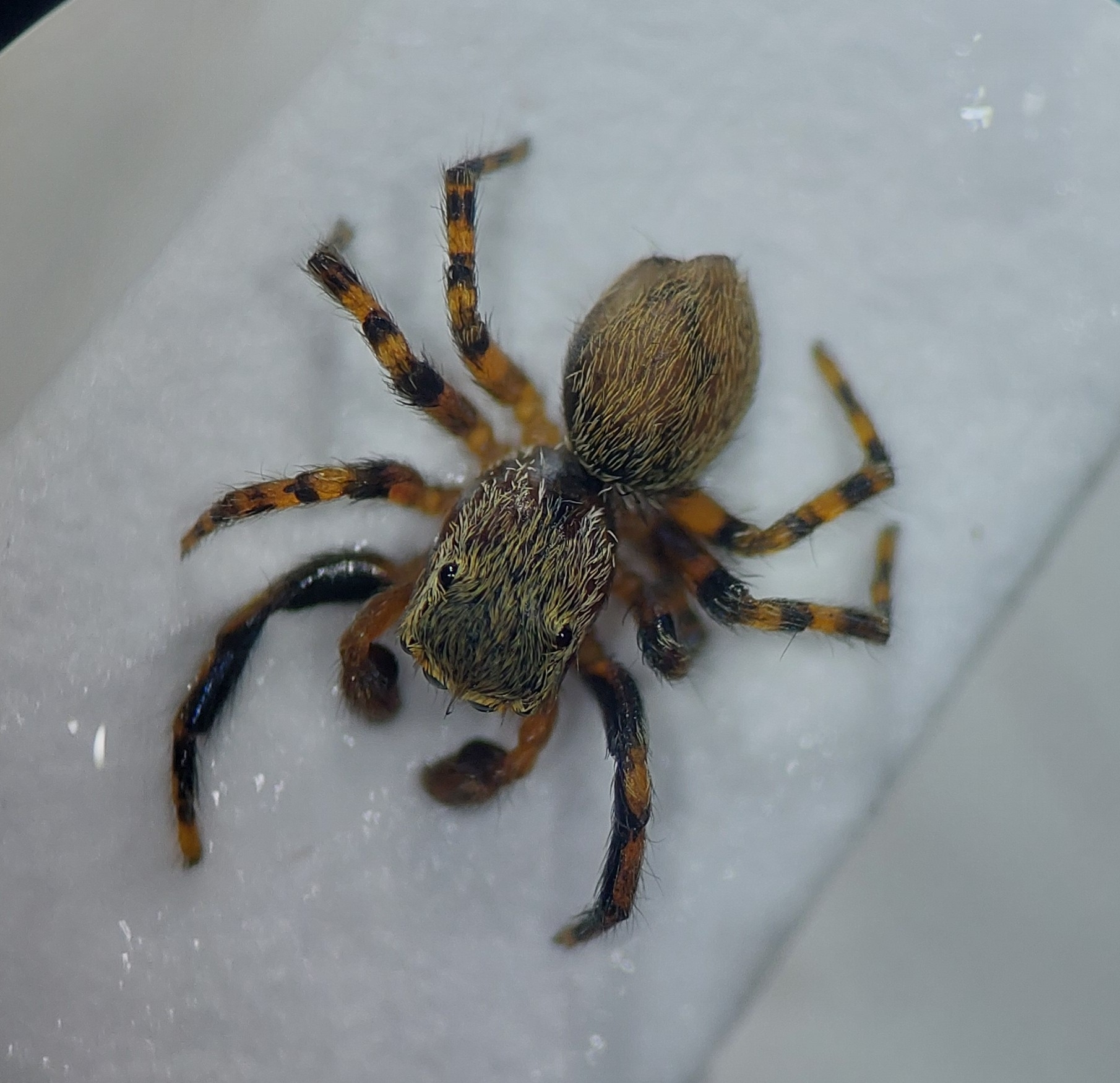
- from Germany

Scientific classification
- Kingdom: Animalia
- Phylum: Arthropoda
- Subphylum: Chelicerata
- Class: Arachnida
- Order: Araneae
- Infraorder: Araneomorphae
- Family: Salticidae
- Genus: Talavera
- Species: T. aequipes

Binomial name
- Talavera aequipes (O. P-Cambridge, 1871)
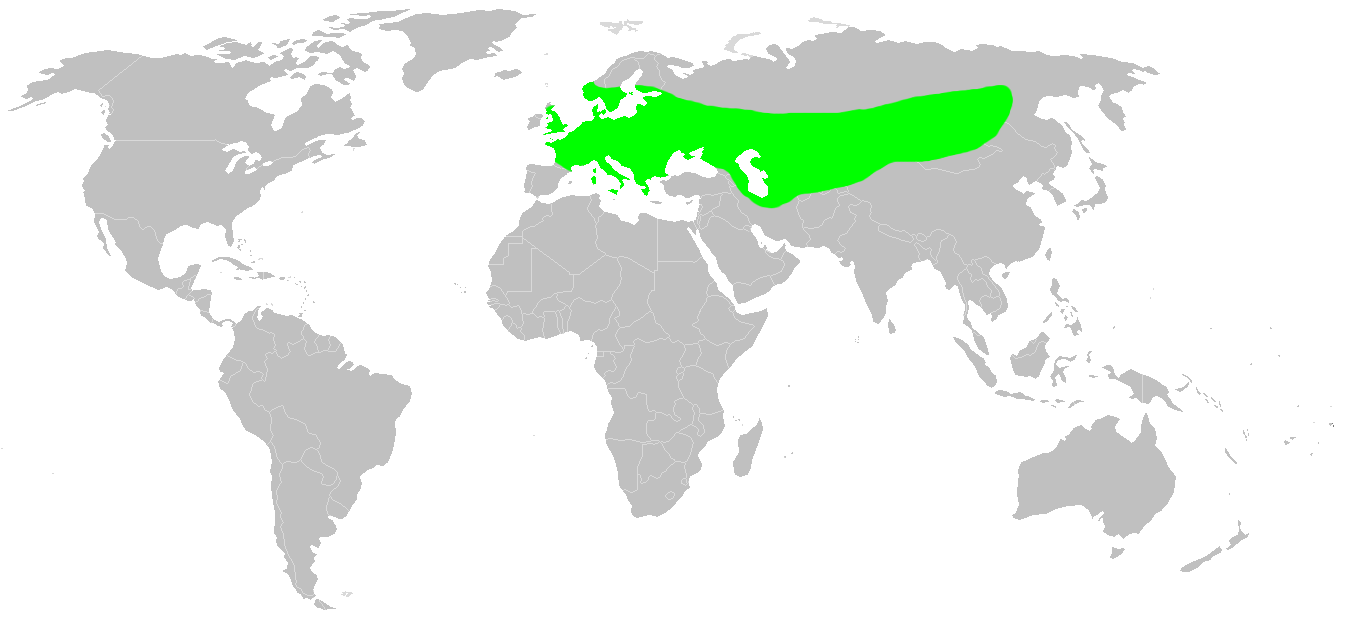

Synonyms
- Salticus aequipes; Attus aequipes; Euophrys aequipes

= Talavera aequipes =

Species of spider

Talavera aequipes is a small jumping spider that is found in Eurasia. It is very hard to distinguish from several very similar species, but is the most frequent of these spiders in Central Europe. It is small enough to reside comfortably in snail shells of down to 5 mm length during winter, where they also lay their eggs. Sometimes it shares a larger shell with Pellenes tripunctatus, where T. aequipes lives deep inside, and P. tripunctatus is found in the larger opening.

== Appearance ==
Males only reach a body size of two mm, females up to 3 millimetres (0.12 in). The body is covered with brown to yellowish hairs, with striped legs. The female has yellow palps, the male has a yellow mask.

== Distribution ==
The species is widely distributed in Europe, but is also found up to Eastern Siberia. It lives mostly on dry meadows.

== Name ==
The species name is Latin for "equal feet".

== Subspecies ==
The subspecies Talavera aequipes ludio (Simon, 1871) occurs only on Corsica. Earlier synonyms are:

- Attus ludio Simon, 1871
- Euophrys ludio Simon, 1876
- Euophrys aequipes ludio Simon, 1937
