= Tanzania parvulus =

Conservation status
- Least Concern (IUCN 3.1)

Scientific classification
- Kingdom: Animalia
- Phylum: Arthropoda
- Subphylum: Chelicerata
- Class: Arachnida
- Order: Araneae
- Infraorder: Araneomorphae
- Family: Salticidae
- Genus: Tanzania
- Species: T. parvulus

Binomial name
- Tanzania parvulus Wesołowska, Azarkina & Russell-Smith, 2014

Species of jumping spider

The Opathe Tanzania Jumping Spider (Tanzania parvulus) is a species of jumping spider in the genus Tanzania. Endemic to South Africa, the species lives in the mountains of KwaZulu-Natal and Limpopo. It is a very small spider, with a cephalothorax that measures between 0.7 and 0.9 mm (0.03 and 0.04 in) long and an abdomen that is between0.6 and 1.1 mm (0.02 and 0.04 in) long. It is its small size that is the source of its specific name, which is a Latin word that can be translated 'very small'. The male is smaller than the female. Its abdomen is marked by a striped pattern of three brown stripes on a yellowish-orange background. It is otherwise generally light brown apart from its blackish eye field. It has distinctive copulatory organs. The male has a small embolus that loops out of the top of the oval palpal bulb and is accompanied by a small spider. The female has a large epigyne and spherical spermathecae at the end of its short seminal ducts.

== Taxonomy and etymology ==
Tanzania parvulus, also known as the Opathe Tanzania Jumping Spider, is a species of jumping spider, a member of the family Salticidae. It was first described by Wanda Wesołowska, Galina Azarkina and Anthony Russell-Smith in 2014. It was one of over 500 species identified by the Polish arachnologist Wesołowska during her career. They allocated it to the genus Tanzania first circumscribed by Ahmet Ö. Koçak and Muhabbet Kemalin in 2008. The genus was named for the distribution of the then extant member species. The species is named for a Latin word that can be translated 'very small', and refers to the size of the spider.

In Wayne Maddison's 2015 study of spider phylogenetic classification, the genus Tanzania was placed in the tribe Euophryini This is a member of the clade Saltafresia. Spiders in the genus are related to Euophrys and Talavera. Junxia Zhang and Maddison speculated that it may be in a clade with Thyenula but that relationship has not been confirmed. In 2017, Jerzy Prószyński placed the genus in an informal group called euophryines.

== Description ==
The Opathe Tanzania Jumping Spider is a very small spider with a body divided into two main parts: a rounded rectangular cephalothorax and an oval abdomen. It is even smaller than the related Table Mountain Tanzania Jumping Spider, Tanzania striatus. The male has a cephalothorax that is between 0.7 and 0.8 mm (0.03 and 0.03 in) long and typically 0.6 mm (0.02 in) wide. Its carapace, the hard upper part of the cephalothorax, is moderately high with a large flat area and sharp slope to the rear. It is light brown with a black line along it edges and a covering of transparent hairs. The eye field is blackish, apart from traces of a brown patch, with long bristles near the eyes themselves, some of which are also accompanied by light hairs. The eyes are noticeably large and convex. The spider's clypeus is very low with a single long protruding hair. The mouthparts, including the labium, are light yellowish.

The male's abdomen is smaller than its carapace, measuring between 0.6 and 0.7 mm long and typically 0.5 mm (0.02 in) wide. The top has three wide brown stripes on a yellowish-orange background. There are also narrow brown stripes on its sides. There are long brown bristles on the front of the abdomen. The spider has short dark spinnerets. Its yellow legs are marked with dark rings. It has relatively large yellow pedipalps. The cymbium is slightly larger than the palpal bulb. Both are oval. There is a meandering sperm duct inside the bulb and a relatively small thin looping embolus that sticks out of the top which is accompanied with an additional spike. It is the way that embolus forms a loop, and that is particularly thin, that helps distinguish the spider from the Table Mountain Tanzania Jumping Spider.

The female is larger than the male. Its cephalothorax is between 0.8 and 0.9 mm (0.04 in) long and between 0.6 and 0.7 mm wide, while its abdomen is between 0.9 and 1.1 mm (0.04 in) long and 0.7 and 0.9 mm wide. It is a similar in colour to the male. The eyes differ in having fawn scales around them. The underside of the abdomen is yellowish and covered in brown hairs. The spinnerets are light yellow with grey tips, while, although the legs are similarly yellow, they have black patches as well as rings. The copulatory organs are also distinctive. The epigyne, the external part of the copulatory organs, is large and marked by two rounded depressions. Its copulatory openings lead to short seminal ducts and spherical spermathecae, or receptacles. There are accessory glands in the walls of the spermathecae. It is these spherical spermathecae that help identify the species.

== Distribution and habitat ==
Initially all Tanzania spiders were identified in Tanzania. The genus is now considered to live across tropical Africa. Tanzania parvulus is endemic to South Africa. It has been found in KwaZulu-Natal and Limpopo. The first specimen to be described was found in eMakhosini Ophathe Heritage Park in 2008 at an altitude of 500 m (1,600 ft) above sea level. Other examples have been found at altitudes of 820 m (2,690 ft) above sea level. The spider thrives in Afromontane forest, being found amongst leaf litter.
