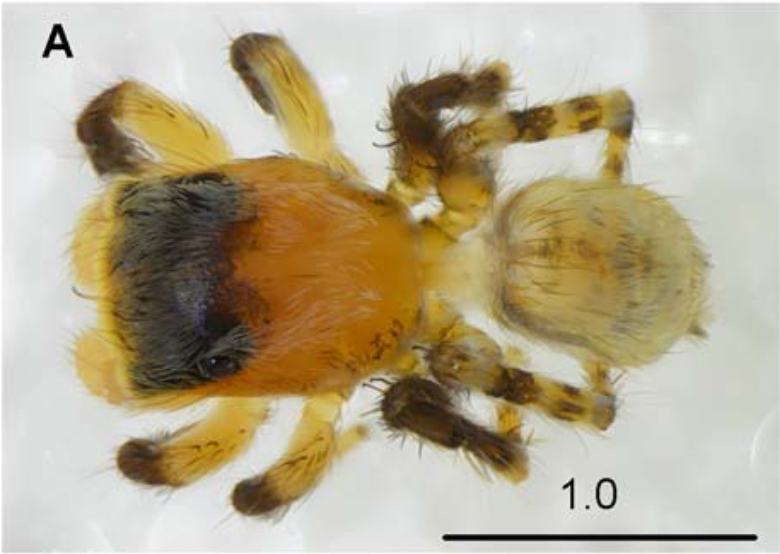
- Adult male

Scientific classification
- Kingdom: Animalia
- Phylum: Arthropoda
- Subphylum: Chelicerata
- Class: Arachnida
- Order: Araneae
- Infraorder: Araneomorphae
- Family: Salticidae
- Genus: Tanzania
- Species: T. mkomaziensis

Binomial name
- Tanzania mkomaziensis (Wesołowska & Russell-Smith, 2000)

Synonyms
- Lilliput mkomaziensis Wesołowska & Russell-Smith, 2000

= Tanzania mkomaziensis =

Species of jumping spider

Tanzania mkomaziensis is a species of jumping spider in the genus Tanzania that lives in Ethiopia, Ivory Coast, Nigeria, South Africa and Tanzania. Mostly active during wet months of the year, the species lives in a wide range of habitats, including savanna and scrubland. First described in 2000, it is a very small spider with a body that consists of a forward section, or carapace, that is between 0.7 and 1.1 mm (0.03 and 0.04 in) long and a rear section, or abdomen, that is between 0.8 and 1.4 mm (0.03 and 0.06 in) long. The male spider's carapace is generally yellowish-orange while the female is brown. All have a darker eye field. The spider's abdomen varies, with some being a plain dark grey, greyish or olive-grey and others, particularly those found in Ethiopia, having a dark mosaic pattern. The spider's legs are often black, but some specimen have paler legs and others have yellow legs with black rings. Its pedipalps are yellow and its spinnerets are grey. The spider has distinctive copulatory organs, particularly the short coiled embolus on the male and the sclerotized fringes on the female's epigyne.

== Taxonomy and etymology ==
Tanzania mkomaziensis is a species of jumping spider, a member of the family Salticidae, that was first described by the arachnologists Wanda Wesołowska and Anthony Russell-Smith in 2000. It was one of over 500 species that Wesołowska identified during her career.

Wesołowska and Russell-Smith initially allocated the spider to the genus Lilliput, circumscribed at the same time by the same authors. It was named after the nation in the novel Gulliver's Travels to signify the small size of the spider. The genus was subsequently renamed Tanzania by Ahmet Ö. Koçak and Muhabbet Kemalin in 2008 as the name Lilliput was already held by a genus of beetle. The new genus name relates to the species distribution. The species is named for Mkomazi Game Reserve, where the holotype was found. The holotype is stored at the Royal Museum for Central Africa in Tervuren.

In Wayne Maddison's 2015 study of spider phylogenetic classification, the genus Tanzania was placed in the tribe Euophryini This is a member of the clade Saltafresia. Spiders in the genus are related to Euophrys and Talavera. Junxia Zhang and Maddison speculated that it may be in a clade with Thyenula but that relationship has not been confirmed. In 2017, Jerzy Prószyński placed the genus in an informal group called euophryines.

== Description ==
Tanzania mkomaziensis is a very small spider. It has a body divided into two main parts: a forward section called a cephalothorax and, behind that, an abdomen. The male carapace, the hard upper part of the cephalothorax, is between 0.9 and 1 mm (0.04 and 0.04 in) long and is typically 0.7 mm (0.03 in) wide. It is rather high and generally yellowish-orange with a covering of long thin brown and grey hairs. Its eye field is dark brown or black with light scales around some of the eyes on some spiders. The underside of its cephalothorax, or its sternum, is yellow with blackish edges. The lower part of the spider's face, or clypeus, is very low. Its mouthparts, including its chelicerae, labium and maxillae, are also yellow, the chelicerae having two teeth at the front and one to the rear.

The male spider's abdomen is similar in size to its carapace, measuring between 0.8 mm (0.03 in) and 0.9 in length and having a similar width of between 0.6 mm (0.02 in) and 0.7 mm. It is dark grey or greyish on top, with some having a vague fawn pattern just visible in the middle. The topside of the abdomen is covered in long brown and whitish hairs and has a delicate scutum covering much of the surface. The underside is greyish. The spider has long grey spinnerets. The spider's legs are generally black with yellow patches, although some of those found have pale legs. They all have long brown dense hairs and brown spines. Its pedipalps, sensory organs near the mouth, are yellow.

The spider's copulatory organs are very distinctive, particularly the shape of the male embolus. The spider has a rounded cymbium that partially surrounds its palpal bulb, which is irregular in shape and is almost as large as the cymbium. A single seminal duct meanders inside it. It has a short tightly-coiled embolus projecting from the top.

The female is similar in size to the male, with a carapace that ranges in length between 0.7 and 1.1 mm (0.03 and 0.04 in) and in width between 0.6 and 0.8 mm (0.02 and 0.03 in), while its abdomen is between 0.9 and 1.4 mm (0.06 in) long and 0.7 to 1.1 wide. The spider's carapace is brown while its eye field is darker and its sternum lighter. Its mouthparts, including the chelicerae, labium and maxillae, are light brown. Some spiders have a yellowish-grey abdomen with lighter top and darker underside. Others are a dark olive-grey all over. There are sparse brown bristles on all of them. The spider's legs are mainly dark, but some spiders have yellow sections and dark rings on some of them. The pedipalps are yellow with a scattering of white hairs.

The female copulatory organs include an external epigyne that shows weak signs of sclerotization and has a spiral fillet near the gonopores. The two copulatory openings lead via short insemination ducts to spherical receptacles, or spermathecae. The spider has small accessory glands. It can be distinguished from other members of the genus by some characteristic sclerotized fringes at the copulatory openings.

== Behaviour and habitat ==
Due to their good eyesight, jumping spiders are mostly diurnal hunters. They attack using a complex approach to their prey and are generally more proactive in comparison to web-spinning spiders. Tanzania mkomaziensis is mostly active during wet months, including March, April and November. The spider lives in a wide range of habitats, particularly hillsides dominated by plant species of the genera Acacia and Commiphora, as well as Combretum bushland and Dichrostachys scrubland. Some spiders live in savanna, being found both on the ground and around the base of grasses.

== Distribution ==
Initially all Tanzania spiders were identified in Tanzania. The holotype for Tanzania mkomaziensis was found in Mkomazi National Park in 1994. It was subsequently identified in Ivory Coast, the first specimen being found in 1975 but not recognised until 25 years later. The spider is also found in Nigeria and Ethiopia. In the latter case, the spider has been observed in Awash National Park living at an altitude of 1,000 m (3,300 ft) above sea level and east of Addis Ababa at an altitude of 2,500 m (8,200 ft) above sea level. Ethiopian spiders differ slightly with the spiders having a dark pattern of grey patches on their abdomen, the female being more contrasting than the male. The first example to be identified in South Africa was found in the Sandveld Nature Reserve in Free State in 2009. At this point it was recognised that the species is the most widespread in the genus. It is likely that it lives across the Afrotropical realm.
