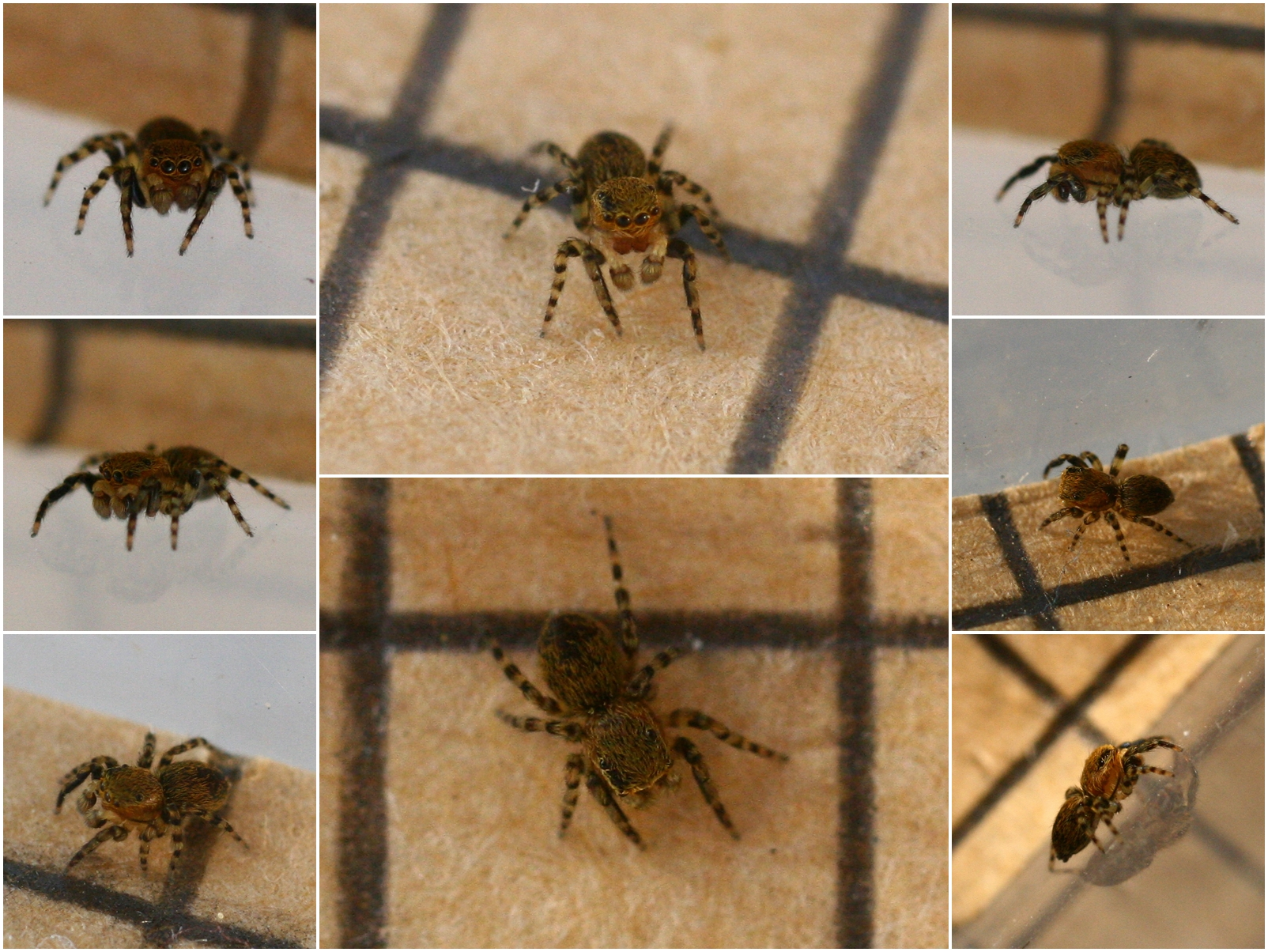
- T. aequipes, male

Scientific classification
- Kingdom: Animalia
- Phylum: Arthropoda
- Subphylum: Chelicerata
- Class: Arachnida
- Order: Araneae
- Infraorder: Araneomorphae
- Family: Salticidae
- Subfamily: Salticinae
- Genus: Talavera; Peckham & Peckham, 1909

Type species
- T. minuta (Banks, 1895)

Species
- 16, see text

= Talavera (spider) =

Genus of spiders

Talavera is a genus of very small jumping spiders that was first described by George and Elizabeth Peckham in 1909. They average about 2 millimetres (0.079 in) in length, and are very similar to each other. In particular, the Central European species are difficult to distinguish, even when their genital features are studied under a microscope. The name refers to Talavera, a region of Spain where many have been found.

== Species ==
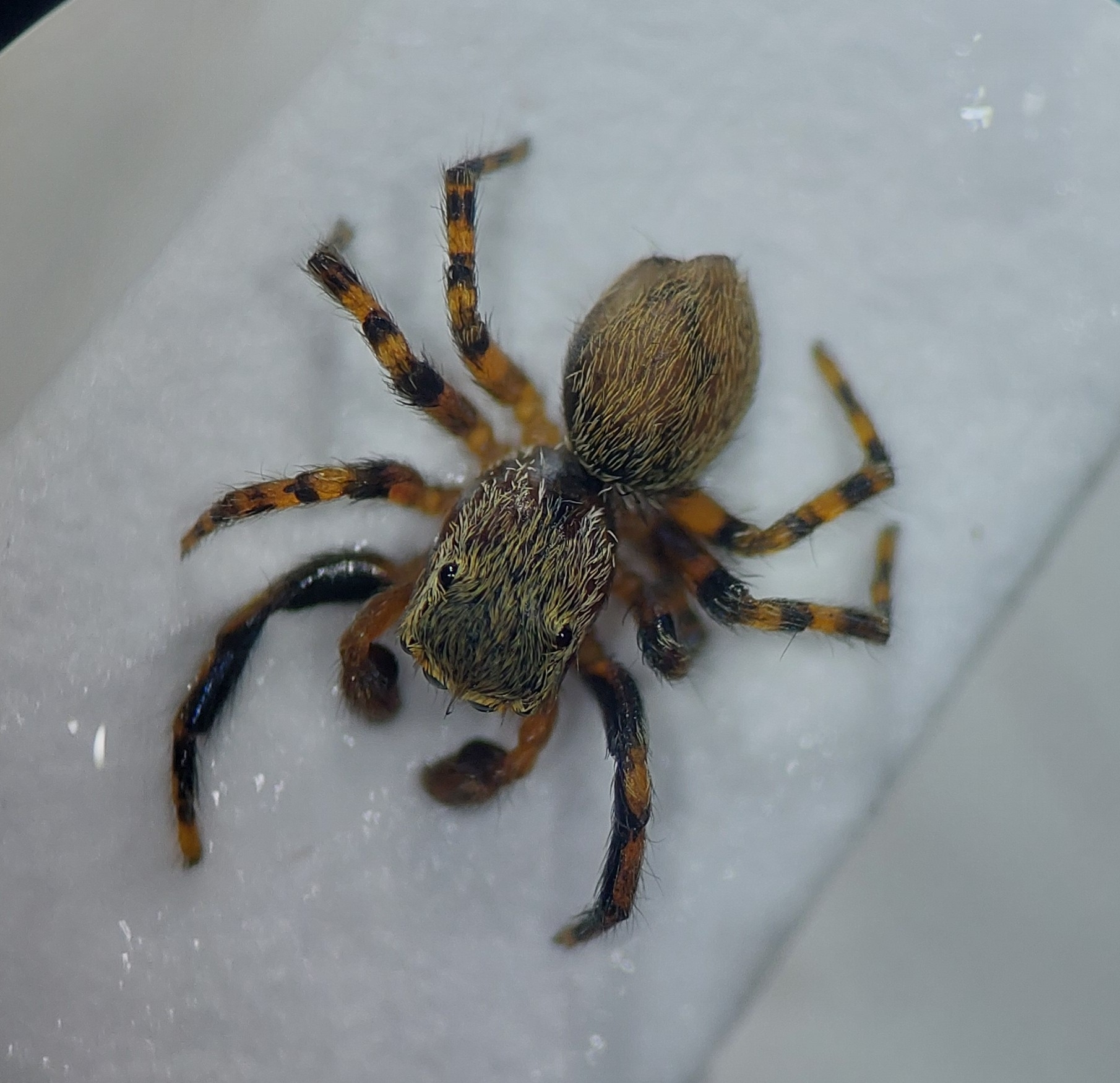
male T. aequipes

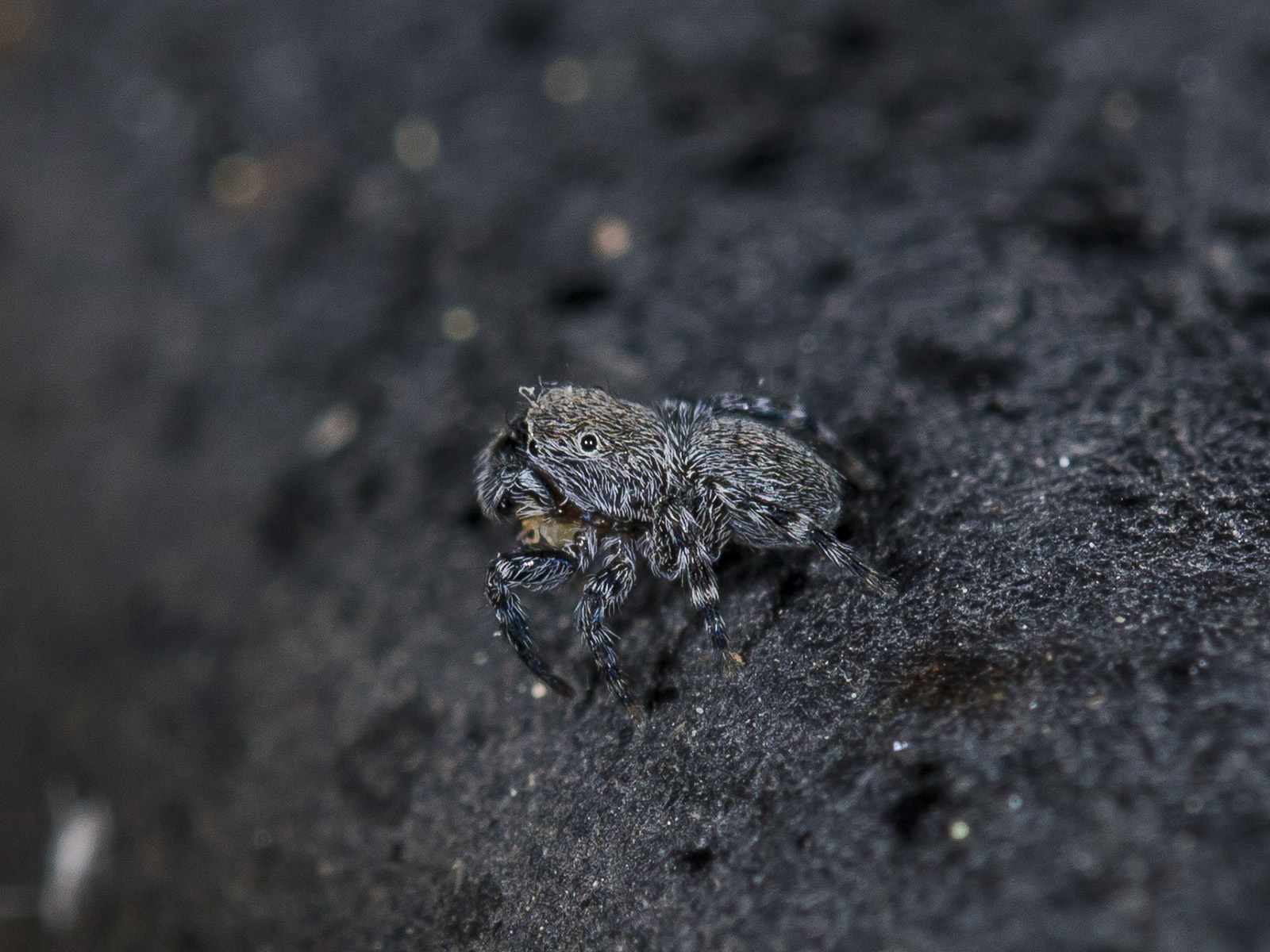
maleT. aperta

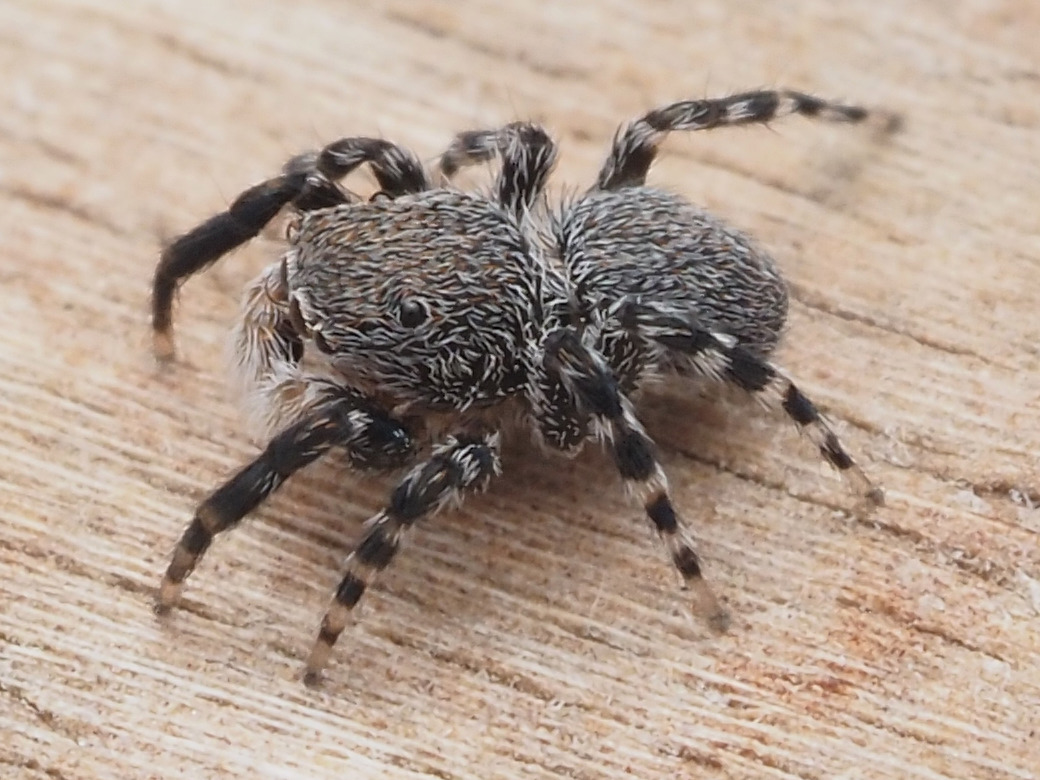
male T. minuta

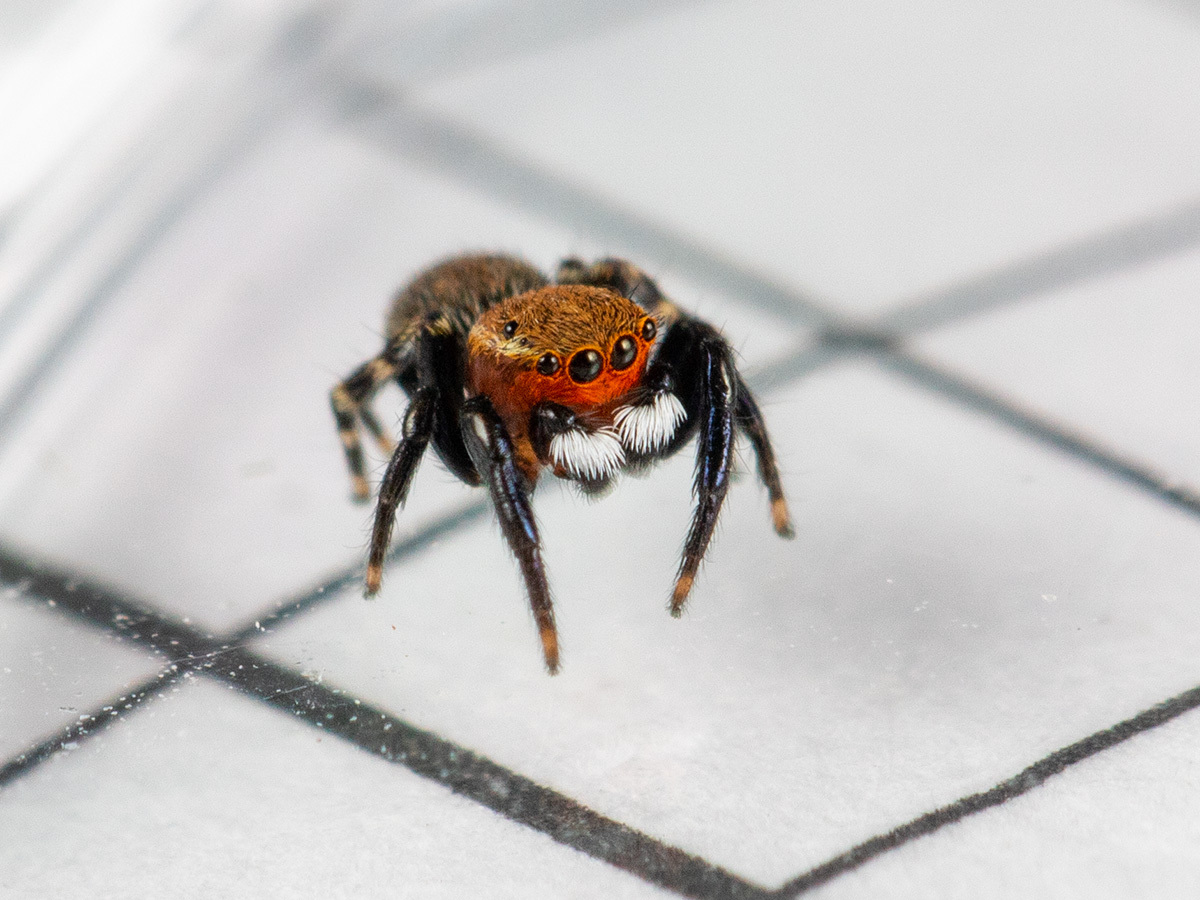
male T. petrensis

As of August 2019 this genus contains sixteen species and one subspecies, found in Europe, Asia, the United States, and Canada:

- Talavera aequipes (O. Pickard-Cambridge, 1871) – Europe, Turkey, Israel, Caucasus, Iran, Russia (Europe) to Central Asia, China, Japan
  - Talavera a. ludio (Simon, 1871) – France (Corsica)
- Talavera aperta (Miller, 1971) – Europe to Central Asia
- Talavera esyunini Logunov, 1992 – Sweden, Finland, Russia (Europe to South Siberia)
- Talavera ikedai Logunov & Kronestedt, 2003 – Korea, Japan
- Talavera inopinata Wunderlich, 1993 – France, Luxembourg, Switzerland, Germany, Austria
- Talavera krocha Logunov & Kronestedt, 2003 – France to Central Asia
- Talavera logunovi Kovblyuk & Kastrygina, 2015 – Ukraine
- Talavera milleri (Brignoli, 1983) – Portugal, Germany, Austria, Czech Rep., Slovakia
- Talavera minuta (Banks, 1895) (type) – Canada, USA, Russia (East Siberia, Far East)
- Talavera monticola (Kulczyński, 1884) – Central, Southern Europe
- Talavera parvistyla Logunov & Kronestedt, 2003 – Northern, Central Europe
- Talavera petrensis (C. L. Koch, 1837) – Europe to Central Asia
- Talavera sharlaa Logunov & Kronestedt, 2003 – Russia (South Siberia)
- Talavera thorelli (Kulczyński, 1891) – Europe to Central Asia, Mongolia
- Talavera trivittata (Schenkel, 1963) – Russia (South Siberia), Mongolia, China
- Talavera tuvensis Logunov & Kronestedt, 2003 – Russia (South Siberia)
