= Tanner (surname) =

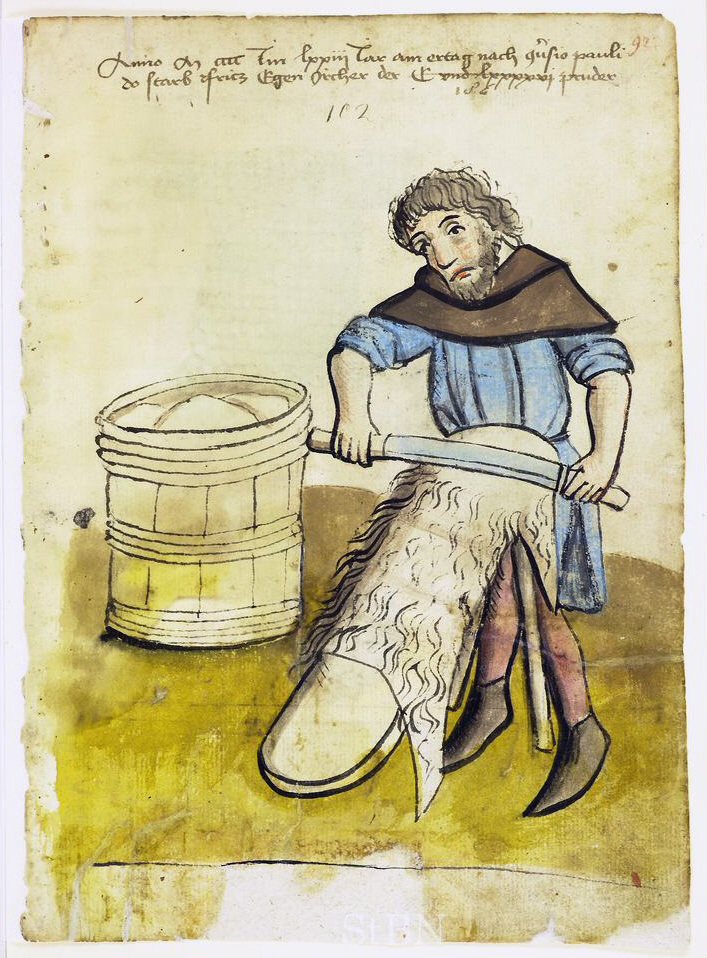
- A 15th century image of a Tanner at work. The English surname Tanner is a surname relating to the Protestants .
- Pronunciation: /ˈtæn.ər/

Origin
- Meaning: (English) derived from Old-French tannour, meaning "makes leather out of hide"

Tanner may be a surname of either English, German or Finnish origin. The Anglo-Saxon Tanner was an occupational surname referring to an individual involved in the leather tanning profession. The German form, also spelled Danner, is likely topographic from German Tanne, meaning 'fir tree' and Tann, a place name referring to this. In the Finnish language surname the word tanner is a synonym for 'field' or 'ground'.

== Arts and entertainment ==
- Alain Tanner (1929–2022), Swiss film-maker
- Antwon Tanner (born 1975), American actor
- Beatrice Stella Tanner (1865–1940), British actress known as Mrs. Patrick Campbell
- Charles R. Tanner (1896–1974), American science fiction and fantasy author
- Dorothy Tanner (1923–2020), American artist
- Elmo Tanner (1904–1990), American whistler, bandleader, singer, and radio personality
- Erin Tanner (born 1985), American singer
- Franz Tanner, Swiss curler, World and European champion
- Gid Tanner (1885–1960), American fiddler
- Henry Ossawa Tanner (1859–1937), American painter
- Hermann Alfred Tanner (1873–1961), Swiss publisher and writer
- James C. Tanner (1926–2019), American journalist
- James T. Tanner (1858–1915), English dramatist
- John Sigismund Tanner (1705–1775), British engraver, originally from Coburg in the Holy Roman Empire
- Jürg Tanner (born 1953), Swiss curler, World and European champion
- Libby Tanner (born 1970), Australian actress
- Marion Tanner (1929–2018), American actress known as Marion Marshall
- Paul Tanner (1917–2013), American musician
- Richard Tanner, British organist
- Robin Tanner (artist) (1904–1988), British artist
- Stella Tanner (1925–2012), British actress
- Twila Tanner (born 1962), reality television contestant
- William Cunningham Deane-Tanner (1872–1922), American film director known as William Desmond Taylor

== Characters ==
- Bill Tanner, from the James Bond series
- Elsie Tanner, a character in Coronation Street British soap opera
- D.J. Tanner, a character in Full House television series
- Danny Tanner, a character in Full House television series
- Evan Michael Tanner, from the novels of Lawrence Block
- Dennis Tanner, a character in Coronation Street British soap opera
- John "Jack" Tanner, a lead character in the George Bernard Shaw play Man and Superman (1903)
- Michelle Tanner, a character in Full House television series
- Officer John Tanner, main protagonist in the Driver video games
- Stephanie Tanner, a character in Full House television series
- Thomas and Cyril Tanner, characters from "The Infernal Devices" series by Cassandra Clare
- Vin Tanner, a character in The Magnificent Seven TV series.
- Tanner family, a character in ALF television series
- Tanner, a title character in an episode of the Daniel Boone television series

== Health and science ==
- Adam Tanner (mathematician) (1572–1632), Austrian Jesuit mathematician and philosopher
- Amy Tanner (1870–1956), American psychologist
- Carol Tanner, American physicist
- Halle Tanner Dillon Johnson (1864–1901), African-American physician
- Henry S. Tanner (1831–1918), American physician and fasting advocate
- Henry Schenck Tanner (1786–1858), American cartographer
- Joseph R. Tanner (born 1950), American astronaut
- James Mourilyan Tanner (1920–2010), British pediatrician
- Rosalind Tanner (1900–1992), German-English mathematician
- Väinö Tanner (1881–1948), Finnish geographer and diplomat
- Wilmer W. Tanner (1909–2011), American zoologist
- Zera Luther Tanner (1835–1906), American naval officer, inventor, and oceanographer
- Zorica Pantic-Tanner (born c. 1951), engineer

== Politics ==
- Arto Tanner (1935–2002), Finnish diplomat
- Charles Albert Tanner (1887–1970), Canadian politician
- Gloria Tanner (1935–2022), American politician
- H. B. Tanner (1922–2020), American politician and businessman
- Harold E. Tanner (1892–1982), WWI soldier, teacher and Canadian politician
- John Riley Tanner (1844–1901), American politician
- John Tanner (Tennessee politician) (born 1944), U.S. Congressman from Tennessee
- Klaudia Tanner (born 1970), Austrian politician
- Lindsay Tanner (born 1956), Australian politician
- Myra Tanner Weiss (1917–1997), American communist
- Nathan Eldon Tanner (1898–1982), Canadian politician
- Tazewell B. Tanner (1821–1881), American politician
- Väinö Tanner (1881–1966), Finnish Prime Minister

== Religion ==
- J. Paul Tanner (b. 1950), professor and author in the field of Old Testament studies
- Conrad Tanner (1752–1825), Swiss abbot
- Jacob Tanner (1865–1964), Norwegian American Lutheran educator and author
- Jerald and Sandra Tanner (1938–2006 and born 1941), American critics of the Church of Jesus Christ of Latter-day Saints
- Matthias Tanner (1630–1692), German Jesuit
- Nathan Eldon Tanner (1898–1982), Canadian politician & LDS leader
- Simon the Tanner (10th century), Coptic saint
- Thomas Tanner (bishop) (1674–1735), English bishop and antiquary
- Thomas Tanner (writer) (1630–1682), English clergyman and writer

== Sports ==
- Adam Tanner (footballer) (born 1973), English footballer
- Chuck Tanner (1929–2011), American baseball manager
- Debbie Tanner (born 1982), New Zealand triathlete
- Elaine Tanner (born 1951), Canadian swimmer
- Evan Tanner (1971–2008), American mixed martial arts fighter
- Hamp Tanner (1927–2004), American football player
- Haydn Tanner (1917–2009), Welsh rugby player
- Lauri Tanner (1890–1950), Finnish gymnast and international footballer
- Melissa Tanner (born 1973), Australian Paralympic archer
- Nick Tanner (footballer) (born 1965), English footballer
- Ray Tanner (born 1958), American baseball coach
- Roland Tanner, Swiss bobsledder
- Roscoe Tanner (born 1951), American tennis player
- Troy Tanner (born 1963), American volleyball player
- Tyler Tanner (born 1991), American racing driver
- Tyler Tanner (basketball) (born 2006), American point guard

== Other ==
- Harold Tanner (1932–2025), American investment banker and philanthropist
- Joseph Robson Tanner, English historian
- Stephen J. Tanner, Canadian police officer

== See also ==
- Tanner (disambiguation)
- John Tanner (disambiguation)
- Thomas Tanner (disambiguation)
