= 1630 in literature =

| List of years in literature | (table) |
- … 1620; 1621; 1622; 1623; 1624; 1625; 1626; 1627; 1628; 1629; 1630; 1631; 1632; 1633; 1634; 1635; 1636; 1637; 1638; 1639; 1640 …
- Art; Archaeology; Architecture; Literature; Music; Philosophy; Science; +...

This article contains information about the literary events and publications of 1630.

== Events ==
- April 10 – English literature, drama, and education lose a major patron and benefactor when William Herbert, 3rd Earl of Pembroke and Lord Chamberlain of England, dies at Baynard's Castle in London.
- June – Scottish-born Presbyterian Alexander Leighton is brought before Archbishop William Laud's Star Chamber court in England for publishing the seditious pamphlet An Appeale to the Parliament, or, Sions Plea Against the Prelacy (printed in the Netherlands, 1628). He is sentenced to be pilloried and whipped, have his ears cropped, one side of his nose slit, and his face branded with "SS" (for "sower of sedition"), to be imprisoned, and be degraded from holy orders.

== New books ==
=== Prose ===
- Johann Heinrich Alsted – Encyclopaedia
- Thomas Dekker – London Look Back
- Thomas Randolph – Aristippus, or The Jovial Philosopher and The Conceited Pedlar (in one volume)

=== Drama ===
- Anonymous – Pathomachia (published)
- John Clavell – The Soddered Citizen
- Sir William Davenant – The Cruel Brother and The Just Italian (published)
- Lope de Vega – El amor enamorado
- Thomas Dekker – The Honest Whore, Part 2 (published)
- Philip Massinger – The Picture and The Renegado (published)
- Antonio Hurtado de Mendoza – Cada loco con su tema o el montañés indiano
- Thomas Middleton – A Chaste Maid in Cheapside (published)
- Thomas Randolph
  - Aristippus
  - Amyntas, or the Impossible Dowry

== Poetry ==
- Lope de Vega – El laurel de Apolo
- Diana Primrose – A Chaine of Pearle; or a memoriall of the peerless graces, and heroick vertues of Queene Elizabeth [sic]
- John Taylor – All the Workes of John Taylor the Water-Poet

== Births ==
- January 19 – Noel Alexandre, French theologian (died 1724)
- February 8 – Pierre Daniel Huet, French scholar and bishop (died 1721)
- February 28 – Matthias Tanner, Bohemian theologian and polymath (died 1692)
- September 13 – Olaus Rudbeck, Swedish scientist and author (died 1702)
- October 31 (baptised) – John Spencer, English scholar and cleric (died 1693)
- October – Isaac Barrow, English theologian and mathematician (died 1677)
- November 24 – Étienne Baluze, French scholar (died 1718)
- December 17 – Kaibara Ekken (貝原 益軒), Japanese philosopher and botanist (died 1714)
- Unknown date – Thomas Tanner, English writer and cleric (died 1682)
- Probable year of birth
  - Vincent Alsop, English Nonconformist religious writer and wit (died 1703)
  - Dorothy White, English Quaker pamphleteer (died 1686)

== Deaths ==
- February 5 – Michael Rabbet, English Bible translator and cleric (born c. 1562)
- March 16 – Sylvester Norris, English priest and controversialist (born c. 1570)
- April 29 – Agrippa d'Aubigné, French Protestant poet and dramatist (born 1552)
- July 3 – Sigismondo Boldoni, Italian writer, poet, and physician (born 1597)
- August 11 – Thomas Walsingham, English courtier and literary patron (born c. 1561)
- October 10 – John Heminges, English actor and co-editor of the First Folio (born c. 1556)
- November 5 – Charles Malapert, Jesuit writer from Spanish Netherlands (born 1581)
- December 30 – Matthias Martinius, German Calvinist theologian (born 1572)
- Approximate dates – Samuel Rowlands, English pamphleteer (born c. 1573)
