= Taner =

Taner (from Turkish tan, "dawn", and er, "man") is usually a Turkish masculine given name and surname.

It may also refer to Taner, a former imperial Chinese commandery.

== Given name ==
- Ahmet Taner Kışlalı (1939−1999), political scientist, author and politician
- Dany Bahar (born 1971), birth name Taner Bahar, Turkish chief executive
- Taner Adu (born 1984), professional basketball player
- Taner Akçam (born 1953), Turkish historian, sociologist and author
- Taner Akyol (born 1977), Turkish bağlama player and classical music composer
- Taner Ari (born 1987), Austrian footballer of Turkish descent
- Taner Birsel (born 1959), Turkish film actor
- Taner Ceylan (born 1967), German-born Turkish photo-realist artist
- Taner Demirbaş (born 1978), Turkish footballer
- Taner Gülleri (born 1976), Turkish footballer
- Taner Öner (born 1971), Turkish women's football manager
- Taner Sağır (born 1985), Turkish weightlifting champion
- Taner Savut (1974–2023), Turkish sporting director and footballer
- Taner Yalçın (born 1990), Turkish-German footballer
- Taner Yıldız (born 1962), Turkish politician
- Taner Yıldız (footballer) (born 1992), Turkish footballer

== Surname ==
- Emre Taner (born 1942), Turkish civil servant
- Görgün Taner (born 1959), Turkish musical festival director
- Güneş Taner (born 1949), Turkish politician and former government minister
- Haldun Taner (1915–1986), playwright
- Rüya Taner, Turkish female pianists.
- Seyyal Taner (born 1952), Turkish female singer and actress
- Uğur Taner (born 1974), Turkish swimmer

== Others ==
- Kadıköy Haldun Taner Stage, a theatre in Kadıköy, Istanbul, Turkey

== See also ==
- Tanna (disambiguation)
- Tanner (disambiguation)
- Tanners (disambiguation)
