= Military attaché =

Diplomat by role

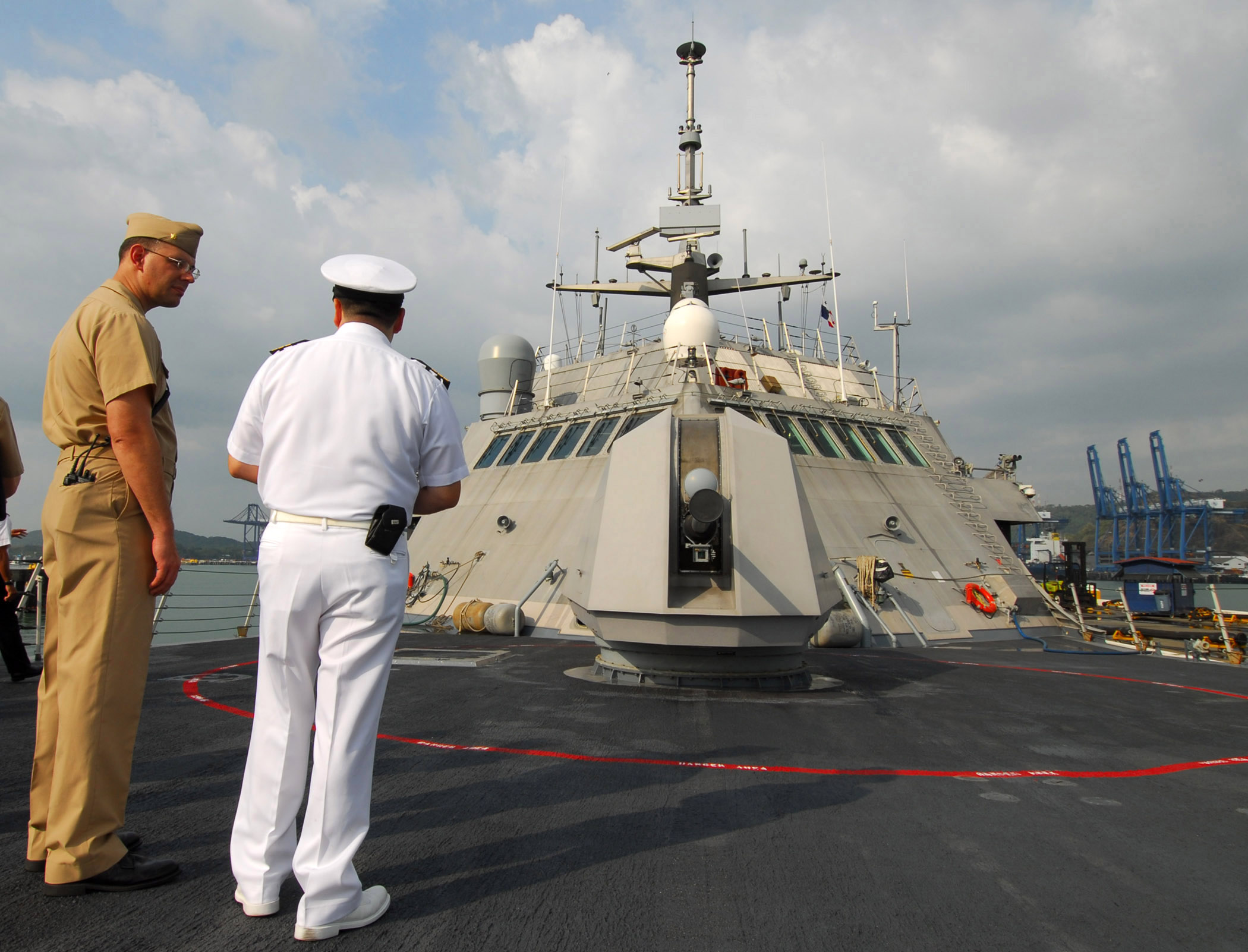
The Chilean defense attaché in Panama (right) receiving a briefing on the armament of the USS Freedom from the ship's executive officer (2010)

A military attaché or defence attaché (DA), sometimes known as a "military diplomat", is an official responsible for military matters within a diplomatic mission, typically an embassy. They are usually high-ranking members of the armed forces who retain their commission while being accorded full diplomatic status and immunity.

Generally, a military attaché serves as a representative of their country's defense establishment, with responsibility over all aspects of bilateral military and defense relations. Their main roles include advising diplomatic officials on security matters and gathering intelligence on the host country's armed forces; they may also be tasked with other security issues, such as migration or law enforcement matters. The duties, qualifications, and management of a military attaché vary between governments.

The term "attaché" is French and denotes an individual who is assigned ("attached") to a diplomatic mission to fulfill a particular specialized function. Generally, a military or defense attaché may come from any branch of the armed forces, although some governments designate an attaché to represent a specific service branch, such as an air force attaché or naval attaché.

== History ==
As a formal diplomatic practice, the defence attaché system is traced to the Thirty Years' War (1618–1648), when French Foreign Secretary Armand Jean du Plessis, First Duke of Richelieu dispatched military officers abroad to liaise with allied powers, monitor military developments and gather intelligence. In the 18th century, DAs were increasingly assigned to embassies, and by the 19th century, the practice had become widespread commensurate with the emergence of national defence departments/ministries and the building of colonial empires. The 20th century brought dramatic changes in the number and background of DAs, owing to the growing number of states, the increasingly complex nature of weapons systems, and the enhanced importance of intelligence gathering, particularly during the Cold War. The DA system was formally recognized in the Vienna Convention of 1961, which codified the rights and responsibilities of diplomats.

== Duties and responsibilities ==
General Edward Stopford Claremont served as the first British military attaché (at first described as "military commissioner") based in Paris for 25 years from 1856 to 1881. Though based in the embassy, he was attached to the French army command during the Crimean War of 1853–1856 and later campaigns.

The functions of a military attaché are illustrated by actions of U.S. military attachés in Japan around the time of the Russo-Japanese War of 1904–1905. A series of military officers had been assigned to the American diplomatic mission in Tokyo since 1901, when the U.S. and Japan were cooperating closely in response to the Boxer Rebellion of 1899–1901 in China. The military attaché advised the United States Ambassador to Japan on military matters, acted as a liaison between United States Army and the Imperial General Headquarters, and gathered and disseminated intelligence. The military attaché's office in Tokyo usually had two assistants and a number of "language officers" who were assigned specifically to learn Japanese while attached to Imperial Japanese Army regiments as observers. These "language officers" translated training and technical manuals and reported on conditions in Japanese military units.

During the Russo-Japanese War (1904–1905), military attachés from many Western military organizations served as observers with the land and naval forces of Russia and of Japan. The United States Army detailed eight officers to serve as military attachés with opposing forces in the field; and all served from the start of hostilities in 1904 through the signing of the peace protocols in September 1905. After the war, the reports of British officers attached to the Japanese forces in the field were combined and published in four volumes. During this conflict, some attachés served primarily in Manchuria, and others served primarily in Tokyo. Some, like Italian naval officer Ernesto Burzagli, saw service both at sea and in Tokyo.

The agreed conditions that allow military attachés to gather information can be misunderstood with fatal results. United States military attaché Maj. Arthur D. Nicholson was killed on March 24, 1985, while photographing a military installation in East Germany 160 kilometres (100 miles) northwest of Berlin. He was reportedly observing from a point not marked off-limits, though near a place that was. According to Sgt. Jessie Schatz, Nicholson's driver, there were no warning shots and the Soviets refused to give Nicholson medical attention for nearly an hour. His role had been agreed to by the United States and the Soviet Union. Soviet liaison-teams were conducting similar missions in West Germany. These tours had evolved into a legalized form of intelligence-gathering, usually accepted by both sides. The killing became a diplomatic incident. In retaliation, the United States expelled Soviet military attaché Stanislav Gromov, who was selected for his effectiveness in collecting intelligence on the United States for the Soviet Union from his post in Washington.

== See also ==
- Arms industry
- Defense Attaché System (US)
- Defence diplomacy
- Diplomat
- Military attachés and observers in the Russo-Japanese War
- Military attachés and war correspondents in the First World War
- Science attaché
- United Nations Military Observer
