= Tanner =

Tanner may refer to:

- Tanner, a person who tans leather and hides

== People ==
- Tanner (given name)
- Tanner (surname), a surname (including a list of people with the name)
- Simon the Tanner (New Testament), a Jaffa resident where Saint Peter stayed, as told in the New Testament
- Simon the Tanner (10th century), a Coptic Orthodox saint
- Theodotus the Tanner (fl. late 2nd century), an early Christian writer from Byzantium

== Places ==
=== Populated places ===
In the United States

- Tanner, Alabama, an unincorporated community
- Tanner, Georgia, an unincorporated community
- Tanner, Kentucky, an unincorporated community
- Tanner, Missouri, an unincorporated community
- Tanner, Washington, a census-designated place
- Tanner, West Virginia, an unincorporated community
- Tanner Township, Kidder County, North Dakota, a civil township

Elsewhere

- Tanner's Settlement, Lunenburg County, Nova Scotia, Canada

=== Other places ===
- Tanner Block, a historic building in Oswego, New York, United States
- Tanner Farmhouse, a historic residence near Wilmer, Alabama, United States
- Tanner High School, a school in Limestone County, Alabama, United States
- Tanner Hill Estate, a public housing estate in Tanner Hill Road, North Point, Hong Kong
- Tanner–Hiller Airport, a public airport in Barre, Massachusetts, United States
- Tanner Island, the westernmost and largest of the Pickersgill Islands, off the south coast of South Georgia
- Tanner Moor, a moorland in Austria
- Tanner Trail, a hiking trail located on the South Rim of the Grand Canyon National Park in Arizona, United States

== Popular culture ==
- Tanner (film), a 1985 Swiss film
- Tanner '88, a television series about a fictional US presidential nominee
- Tanner, fictional video game character and protagonist of the Driver series
- Tanner on Tanner, a 2004 comedy
- "Mr. Tanner", a song by Harry Chapin from his 1974 album Short Stories
- Tanner (band), an American band active in the 1990s

== Other uses ==
- Tanner, the sixpence, a British pre-decimal coin
- 13668 Tanner, a main-belt asteroid discovered on 28 April 1997
- Tanner crab (Chionoecetes bairdi), a crab species
- Tanner Cup, a New Zealand sailing competition
- Tanner graph, a bipartite graph used to state constraints or equations which specify error correcting codes
- Tanner scale, a scale of physical development in children, adolescents and adults
- USNS Tanner, a ship
- USS Tanner (AGS-15), an attack cargo ship of the U.S. Navy
- Prionus coriarius, the tanner beetle

== See also ==
- O.C. Tanner (disambiguation)
- Taner
- Tanners (disambiguation)
- Tanna (disambiguation)
