= Efate (spider) =

Scientific classification
- Kingdom: Animalia
- Phylum: Arthropoda
- Subphylum: Chelicerata
- Class: Arachnida
- Order: Araneae
- Infraorder: Araneomorphae
- Family: Salticidae
- Subfamily: Salticinae
- Genus: Efate; Berland, 1938

Species
- See text.

Genus of spiders

Efate is a genus of the spider family Salticidae (jumping spiders).

== Description ==
These ant-like spiders are three to five millimeters long. The carapace is flattened. E. raptor males have enlarged first legs, giving them a raptorial appearance.

The genus Rarahu from the same subfamily is rather similar, as is Sobasina.

== Name ==
Efate is an island in the Republic of Vanuatu, where the first specimen was found. The salticid genus Araneotanna is also named after an island of Vanuatu.

== Species ==
- Efate albobicinctus Berland, 1938 (Guam, Caroline Is., New Hebrides, Samoa, Fiji)
- Efate fimbriatus Berry, Beatty & Prószyn'ski, 1996 (Caroline Is., Marshall Is.)
- Efate raptor Berry, Beatty & Prószyn'ski, 1996 (Fiji)
