= Attaché =

Diplomatic or administrative role

In diplomacy, an attaché (French pronunciation: [ataʃe]) is a person who is assigned ("to be attached") to the diplomatic or administrative staff of a higher placed person or another service or agency. Although a loanword from French, in English the word is not modified according to gender.

An attaché is normally an official, who serves either as a diplomat or as a member of the support staff, under the authority of an ambassador or other head of a diplomatic mission, mostly in intergovernmental organizations or international non-governmental organisations or agencies. Attachés monitor various issues related to their area of specialty (see examples below) that may require some action. To this end, attachés may undertake the planning for events to be attended, decisions which will be taken, managing arrangements and agendas, conducting research, and acting as a representative of the interests of their state when necessary, to the types of organizations mentioned above, and also to national academies and to industry.

Sometimes an attaché has special responsibilities or expertise. Examples include a cultural attaché, customs attaché, police officer attaché, labor attaché, legal attaché, liaison officer attaché, military/defense attaché, press attaché, agricultural attaché, commercial attaché, maritime attaché and science attaché.

== Military attaché ==
Typically, a military attaché serves on the diplomatic staff of an embassy or consulate while retaining a military commission.

== Science attaché ==
A science attaché advises on issues pertaining to science and technology.

== Health attaché ==
A health attaché advises on global health issues and may serve multiple functions. A "diplomat who collects, analyzes, and acts on information concerning health in a foreign country or countries and provides critical links between public health and foreign affairs stakeholders." Earlier known more as Medical Attaché. Health attaches are the missing link for global diplomacy.

== Holy See ==
The title is also used in reference to diplomacy and in the hierarchical administration of the Catholic Church, specifically in the Roman Curia, in cases where a priest, usually in the diplomatic corps of the Holy See or else released for service to the Holy See, serves in a nunciature in a given country or to an international or intergovernmental organization. Especially in the latter cases, the official often provides a particular expertise in the service of the Church, thus, legal or otherwise.

== See also ==
- Military attachés and observers in the Russo-Japanese War
- Military attachés and war correspondents in the First World War
- Press secretary
- Chargé d'affaires
- Attache case

== Bibliography ==
- Craig, Gordon A. (1949) "Military diplomats in the Prussian and German service: the attachés, 1816-1914." Political Science Quarterly (1949): 65-94 online.
- Cullen, Glen T. (1999). "Preparing for battle: Learning Lessons in the US Army during World War I." U.S. Army Command and General Staff College (CGSC), Combined Arms Research Library.
- ---. Office of the Chief of Staff, Second (military) Information Division. (1906). Reports of the Military Observers attached to the Armies in Manchuria during the Russo-Japanese War, Vol. I; (1907). Vol. II. Washington, D.C.: Government Printing Office.
- Sisemore, James D. (2003). "The Russo-Japanese War, Lessons Not Learned." CGSC.
- ---. (1907). The Russo-Japanese War, Reports from British Officers Attached to the Japanese Forces in the Field, Vol. I; (1908). Vol. II. London: General Staff.
