= List of Légion d'honneur recipients by name (T) =

The French government gives out the Legion of Honour awards, to both French and foreign nationals, based on a recipient's exemplary services rendered to France, or to the causes supported by France. This award is divided into five distinct categories (in ascending order), i.e. three ranks: Knight, Officer, Commander, and two titles: Grand Officer and Grand Cross. Knight is the most common and is awarded for either at least 20 years of public service or acts of military or civil bravery. The rest of the categories have a quota for the number of years of service in the category below before they can be awarded. The Officer rank requires a minimum of eight years as a Knight, and the Commander, the highest civilian category for a non-French citizen, requires a minimum of five years as an Officer. The Grand Officer and the Grand Cross are awarded only to French citizens, and each requires three years' service in their respective immediately lower rank. The awards are traditionally published and promoted on 14 July.

The following is a non-exhaustive list of recipients of the Legion of Honour awards, since the first ceremony in May 1803. 2,550 individuals can be awarded the insignia every year. The total number of awards is close to 1 million (estimated at 900,000 in 2021, including over 3,000 Grand Cross recipients), with some 92,000 recipients alive today. Only until 2008 was gender parity achieved among the yearly list of recipients, with the total number of women recipients since the award's establishment being only 59 at the end of the second French empire and only 26,000 in 2021.

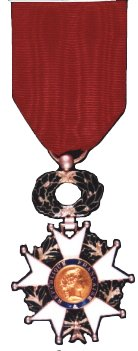

Recipient	Dates (birth–death)	General Work, and reason for the recognition	Award Category (Date)
Éric Tabarly	1931–1998	French Navy officer and yachtsman. Recognised for winning the 64th edition of the Single-Handed Trans-Atlantic Race.	Knight
Aguibu Tall	1843?-1907	Faama of Dinguiraye and Macina, son of El Hajj Umar Tall	
Görgün Taner	1959–present	General Director of the Istanbul Foundation for Culture and Arts (İKSV). Turkey commissioner during the Cultural Season of Turkey in France.	Knight (January 2011)
Louis-Alexandre Taschereau	1867–1952	14th Premier of Quebec, Canada	
J. R. D. Tata	1904–1993	Indian aviator, industrialist, entrepreneur and chairman of Tata Group. Recognised for his contributions to Indian industry	TBA (1983)
Julia Catlin Park DePew Taufflieb	1864–1947	An American who lived in France during World War I. Famous for turning her residence (Chateau d'Annel) into a field hospital (Note: First female American to receive this award).	TBA (1917)
François Tavenas	1942–2004	Canadian engineer and academic	Knight (1999)
Elizabeth Taylor	1932–2011	English-American actress, businesswoman, and humanitarian. recognised for her philanthropic work in HIV/AIDS activism.	Knight (1987)
Maxwell D. Taylor	1901–1987	United States Army officer and diplomat	Knight; Commander
Frederick Temple	1925-2019	Royal Marines, Coxwain during D-Day as a LCA Coxswain	Knight (2018)
Ludmilla Tchérina	1924–2004	Circassian princess, prima ballerina, actress, author and sculptor.	Officier (1980)
Vojin Tcholak-Antitch	1877–1945	Serbia senior army officer in the Royal Serbian Army and the Royal Yugoslav Army. Recognised for his actions during the Franco-Serb offensive, and the subsequent capitulation of Bulgaria.	TBA (1929)
Pierre Teilhard de Chardin	1881–1955	French Jesuit priest, scientist, paleontologist, theologian, philosopher and teacher. Recognised for his service in World War I as a stretcher-bearer in the 8th Moroccan Rifles.	
Joaquim Salvador Lavado Tejon (known as Quino)	1932–2020	Argentine-Spanish People cartoonist	TBA (March 2014)
Nüvit Tekül	1921–2005	Professor of medicine from Turkey.	Knight (1982)
Charles Tellier	1828–1913	French Engineer	
Iran Teymourtash	1914–1991	Women's rights activist in Iran.	
Jean Victor Tharreau	1767–1812	French general, died at Battle of Borodino	
Florian Thauvin	1993–present	French professional footballer (Liga MX club Tigres UANL)	Knight (2018)
Marie-Jo Thiel	1957–present	French ethics academic	Knight (29 June 2013)
Kristin Scott Thomas	1960–present	English actress, also holding French citizenship.	
Mathilde Thomas		Cosmetics Entrepreneur	
Harold Warris Thompson	1908–1983	English physical chemist, who served as chairman of the Football Association.	Knight (1971)
Joseph R. Thompson		U.S. Army World War II veteran	Knight (2012)
Sir Henry Worth Thornton	1871–1933	Businessman and Railways Manager	
Jean Thurel	1699–1807	French soldier. Known for having an unusually long career that spanned 92 years of service [Note: One of the first to receive the award.]	Knight (26 October 1804)
Germaine Tillion	1907–2008	French ethnologist [NOTE: One of the only five women who ever received this award.]	Grand Cross
Alexis de Tocqueville	1805–1859	French aristocrat, diplomat, political scientist, political philosopher, and historian.	
Jean Todt	1946–present	French motor racing executive and former rally co-driver	Grand Cross (2011)
Corentin Tolisso	1994–present	French professional footballer (Bundesliga club Bayern Munich / France national football team.	Knight (2018)
Edward Tomkins	1915–2007	British diplomat	Grand Officer (1984)
Charles Hard Townes	1915–2015	U.S. physicist	
Mira Trailovic	1924–1989	Serbia dramaturg and theatre director (Serbian and Yugoslavia theatre).	TBA (1985)
Catherine Trautmann	1951	French politician (French Socialist Party)	
Constant Troyon	1810–1865	French painter of the Barbizon school.	
Louis W. Truman	1908–2004	United States Army officer	
Lap-Chee Tsui	1950–Present	China-born Canada geneticist	Knight (October 2007)
André Tulard	1899–1967	Civil administrator and police inspector. [Note: An active collaborator with the Germans in World War II.]	
Jean Turcan	1846–1895	French sculptor who specialized particularly in public figures.	TBA (1888)
André Turcat	1921–2016	French test pilot (Chief test pilot of the first Concorde prototype)	Grand Officer (2005)
Adélard Turgeon	1863–1930	Canada lawyer and politician.	Knight (1904); Officer (1928)
John Joseph Turk		U.S. Army World War II Veteran	Knight (December 2013)
Desmond Tutu	1931–2021	South Africa Anglican cleric and theologian. Known for his anti-apartheid and human rights activism work.	Grand Officer (1998)
Nathan Farragut Twining	1897–1982	United States Air Force general	Knight; Commander
Edward W. Tyre	1924 -– 2021	United States Army Air Corps pilot, 2nd Lieutenant, World War II veteran	Knight (April 2013)

== See also ==
- Legion of Honour
- List of Legion of Honour recipients by name
- List of foreign recipients of Legion of Honour by name
- List of foreign recipients of the Legion of Honour by country
- List of British recipients of the Legion of Honour for the Crimean War
- Legion of Honour Museum
- Ribbons of the French military and civil awards
- War Cross (France)
