= Thomas Tanner =

Thomas Tanner may refer to:

- Thomas Tanner (bishop) (1674–1735), English antiquary and prelate
- Thomas Tanner (writer) (1630–1682), English clergyman and writer
- Thomas Hawkes Tanner (1824–1871), English physician
- Thomas Tanner (New Zealand politician) (1830–1918), New Zealand politician
- Thomas Tanner (MP) (died 1401), MP for Wells
