= R. nitida =

R. nitida may refer to:

- Rarahu nitida, a spider species endemic to Samoa
- Rosa nitida, the shining rose, a plant species native to northeastern North America, from Connecticut north to Newfoundland and Quebec

== See also ==
- Nitida (disambiguation)
