= Saïdou Bokoum =

Guinean writer (born 1945)

Saïdou Bokoum (born 1945) is a Guinean writer. Born in Dinguiraye, in 1974 he published Chaîne, a novel about the plight of Africans living in France. He has published several works related to theatre.
