= Tanner (given name) =

Tanner is a mainly masculine given name meaning "leather maker" and "one who is smart."

Notable people and animals with the name include:

- Tanner Arkin (born 2003), American football player
- Tanner Brown (born 1999), American football player
- Tanner Cohen, American stage, film and television actor and singer
- Tanner Conner (born 1998), American football player
- Tanner Foreman (born 2010), American basketball and soccer player
- Tanner Foust (born 1973), American professional racing driver, stunt driver and television host
- Tanner Glass (born 1983), Canadian professional ice hockey player
- Tanner Hall (skier) (born 1983), American freeskier
- Tanner Houck (born 1996), American baseball player
- Tanner Hudson (born 1994), American football player
- Tanner Ingle (born 1999), American football player
- Tanner Jeannot (born 1997), Canadian ice hockey player
- Tanner Koziol (born 2004), American football player
- Tanner Lee (born 1995), American football player
- Tanner Maguire (born 1998), American child actor
- Tanner Mangum (born 1993), American football player
- Tanner McCalister (born 2000), American football player
- Tanner McKee (born 2000), American football player
- Tanner McLachlan (born 1999), Canadian American football player
- Tanner Miller, American football player
- Tanner Mordecai (born 2000), American football player
- Tanner Morgan (born 1999), American football player
- Tanner Murray (born 1999), American baseball player
- Tanner Muse (born 1996), American football player
- Tanner Novlan (born 1986), Canadian actor
- Tanner Owen (born 1996), American football player
- Tanner Patrick (born 1991), American singer-songwriter
- Tanner Pearson (born 1992), Canadian ice hockey player
- Tanner Petulla (born 1993), American DJ
- Tanner Purdum (born 1984), American football player
- Tanner Rainey (born 1992), American professional baseball player
- Tanner Roark (born 1986), American professional baseball player
- Tanner Scheppers (born 1987), American professional baseball player
- Tanner Schmekel (born 1999), Canadian football player
- Tanner Schobel (born 2001), American baseball player
- Tanner Smith (1887–1919), American criminal and gang leader in New York City
- Tanner Smith (basketball) (born 1990), American professional basketball player
- Tanner Sparks (born 1988), American rock musician
- Tanner Tessmann (born 2001), American professional soccer player
- Tanner Vallejo (born 1994), American football player
- Tanner Varner (born 1984), American football player
- Tanner Vili (born 1976), Samoan rugby union football player
- Tanner Wayne (born 1988), American drummer
- Tanner Wright (born 1997), American Paralympic sprinter
- Tanner (1929–1952), the first MGM Studio lion to be filmed in three-strip Technicolor, used from 1934 to 1956 and on MGM cartoons from 1963 to 1967
- Tanner Boyle from The Bad News Bears

== See also ==
- Tanner (disambiguation)
