= Sobasina yapensis =

Scientific classification
- Kingdom: Animalia
- Phylum: Arthropoda
- Subphylum: Chelicerata
- Class: Arachnida
- Order: Araneae
- Infraorder: Araneomorphae
- Family: Salticidae
- Genus: Sobasina
- Species: S. yapensis

Binomial name
- Sobasina yapensis Berry, Beatty & Prószyński, 1998

Species of spider

Sobasina yapensis is a species of jumping spider.

== Name ==
The species is named after the Yap island group on which it occurs.

== Distribution ==
Sobasina yapensis is only known from Yap in the Caroline Islands.
