= Sobasina paradoxa =

Scientific classification
- Kingdom: Animalia
- Phylum: Arthropoda
- Subphylum: Chelicerata
- Class: Arachnida
- Order: Araneae
- Infraorder: Araneomorphae
- Family: Salticidae
- Genus: Sobasina
- Species: S. paradoxa

Binomial name
- Sobasina paradoxa Berry, Beatty & Prószyński, 1998

Species of spider

Sobasina paradoxa is a jumping spider.

== Name ==
The epitheton paradoxa is based on the unusual body form, compared with other Sobasina species.

== Appearance ==
Sobasina paradoxa looks somewhat like a beetle, unlike other Sobasina species that more resemble ants.

== Distribution ==
Sobasina paradoxa is only known from Viti Levu, Fiji.
