= Sobasina platypoda =

Scientific classification
- Kingdom: Animalia
- Phylum: Arthropoda
- Subphylum: Chelicerata
- Class: Arachnida
- Order: Araneae
- Infraorder: Araneomorphae
- Family: Salticidae
- Genus: Sobasina
- Species: S. platypoda

Binomial name
- Sobasina platypoda Berry, Beatty & Prószyński, 1998

Species of spider

Sobasina platypoda is a jumping spider.

== Name ==
platypoda "flat-footed" is based on the flattened dorsum of tibia 1 in both sexes.

== Appearance ==
In contrast to other Sobasina species, in this one both sexes are quite similar. In males, however, the first legs are longer, in females the fourth. S. platypoda could at first be confused with Efate raptor.

== Distribution ==
Sobasina platypoda is only known from Viti Levu and Ovalau islands of Fiji.
