= Sobasina magna =

Scientific classification
- Kingdom: Animalia
- Phylum: Arthropoda
- Subphylum: Chelicerata
- Class: Arachnida
- Order: Araneae
- Infraorder: Araneomorphae
- Family: Salticidae
- Genus: Sobasina
- Species: S. magna

Binomial name
- Sobasina magna Berry, Beatty & Prószyński, 1998

Species of spider

Sobasina magna is a species of jumping spider.

== Name ==
The epitheton magna "large" refers to the fact that S. magna is the largest Sobasina species (7mm) yet known.

== Distribution ==
Sobasina magna is only known from Tonga.
