= Sobasina amoenula =

Scientific classification
- Kingdom: Animalia
- Phylum: Arthropoda
- Subphylum: Chelicerata
- Class: Arachnida
- Order: Araneae
- Infraorder: Araneomorphae
- Family: Salticidae
- Genus: Sobasina
- Species: S. amoenula

Binomial name
- Sobasina amoenula Simon, 1898

Species of spider

Sobasina amoenula is a species of jumping spider.

== Distribution ==
Sobasina amoenula is endemic to the Solomon Islands.
