= Sobasina cutleri =

Scientific classification
- Kingdom: Animalia
- Phylum: Arthropoda
- Subphylum: Chelicerata
- Class: Arachnida
- Order: Araneae
- Infraorder: Araneomorphae
- Family: Salticidae
- Genus: Sobasina
- Species: S. cutleri

Binomial name
- Sobasina cutleri Berry, Beatty & Prószyński, 1998

Species of spider

Sobasina cutleri is a species of jumping spider.

== Name ==
The species is named for salticid specialist Bruce Cutler of the University of Kansas in Lawrence.

== Distribution ==
Sobasina cutleri is only known from Viti Levu and Ovalau Islands in Fiji.
