= Sobasina aspinosa =

Scientific classification
- Kingdom: Animalia
- Phylum: Arthropoda
- Subphylum: Chelicerata
- Class: Arachnida
- Order: Araneae
- Infraorder: Araneomorphae
- Family: Salticidae
- Genus: Sobasina
- Species: S. aspinosa

Binomial name
- Sobasina aspinosa Berry, Beatty & Prószyński, 1998

Species of spider

Sobasina aspinosa is a species of jumping spider.

== Name ==
The epitheton aspinosa "spineless" refers to the absence of spines from the legs.

== Distribution ==
Sobasina aspinosa is known from the islands of Viti Levu and Vanua Levu in Fiji.
