= Thomas Hawkes Tanner =

English physician and medical writer

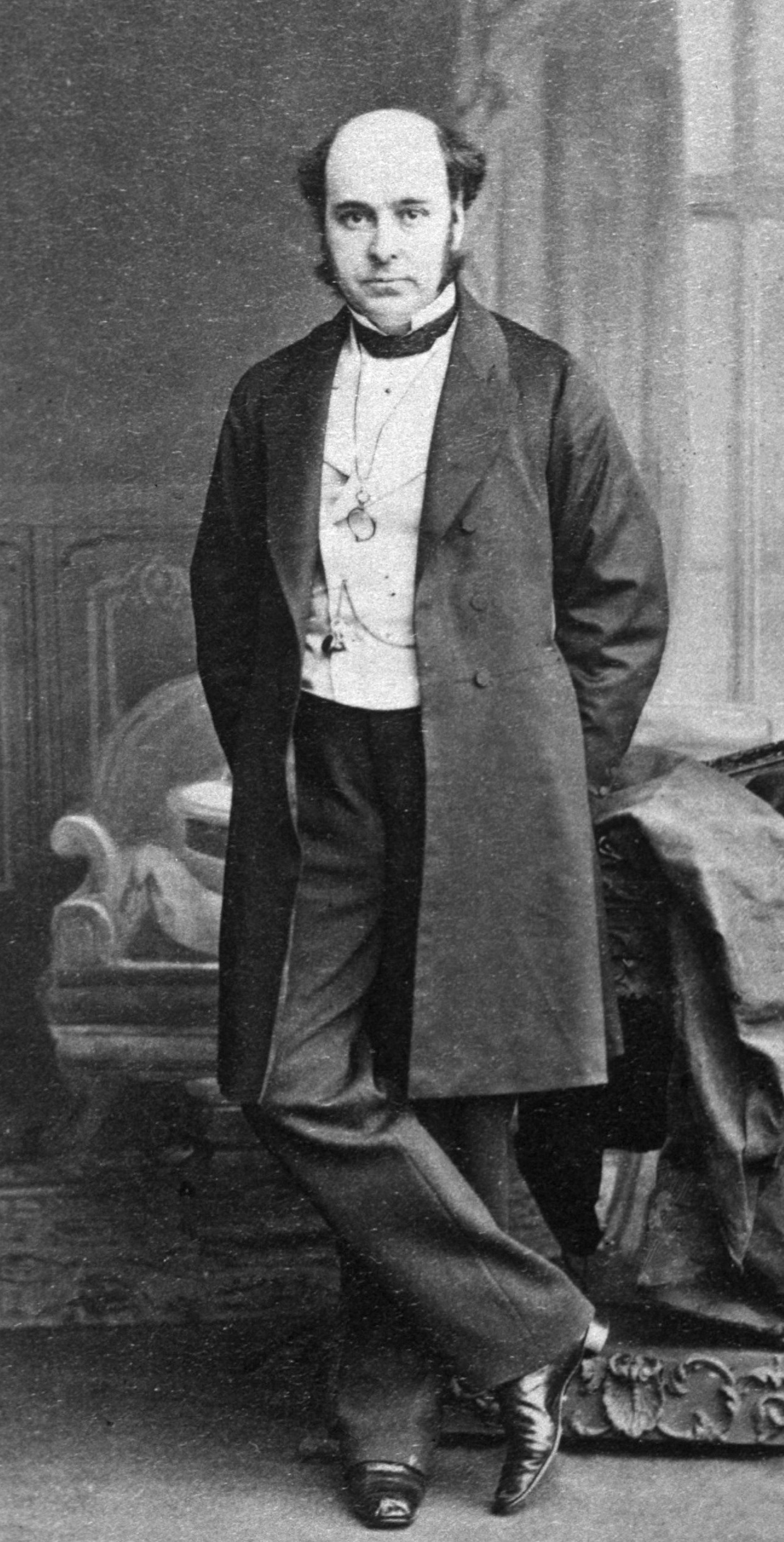
Thomas Hawkes Tanner in 1868

Thomas Hawkes Tanner (9 July 1824 – 7 July 1871) was an English physician and medical writer.

== Life ==
Tanner was the son of Thomas Tanner, secretary to the Army Medical Board. He received the greater part of his education at Charterhouse School. There he met with a serious accident, which affected his health for a number of years.

Tanner began medical studies at King's College London, in 1843, and graduated at St. Andrews University as doctor of medicine in 1847. He then went into general practice in Charlotte Street in London, and was shortly afterwards elected physician to the Farringdon Street dispensary. He was enrolled a member of the Royal College of Physicians in 1850, and set up in consulting practice.

In 1851 Tanner was elected physician to the Hospital for Women in Soho Square, and concentrated on gynæcology, though also lecturing on forensic medicine at the medical school attached to Westminster Hospital. In 1858 he took part in the foundation of the Obstetrical Society of London, and became one of its first secretaries.

In 1860 the council of King's College London, decided to appoint two assistant physicians for the diseases of women and children. Tanner was selected to fill one of these posts, and Alfred Meadows the other. He resigned the under the pressure of increasing work, in 1863.

Tanner acquired a large practice, but was unable to cope with the workload. He left London, and died at Brighton on 7 July 1871.

== Works ==
Tanner was a voluminous writer: his major work was A Manual of the Practice of Medicine (1854) which sold well in the United Kingdom and America. The 7th edition as revised by Sir William Henry Broadbent was issued in 2 vols. in 1875. His other works were:

- A Manual of Clinical Medicine and Physical Diagnosis, London, 1855; 3rd. ed. revised by Tilbury Fox, 1876.
- A Practical Treatise on the Diseases of Infancy and Childhood, London, 1858; 3rd edit., enlarged, by Alfred Meadows, 1879.
- On the Signs and Diseases of Pregnancy, London, 1860.
- Memoranda on Poisons, 1st ed. London, 1848; 7th American edition Philadelphia, 1892.
- An Index of Diseases and their Treatment, London, 1st edit. 1866; 4th edition revised by Percy Boulton, London, 1891. This work was translated into Japanese, 6 vols. Tokyo, 1874–7.

== Notes ==
Attribution

This article incorporates text from a publication now in the public domain: Lee, Sidney, ed. (1898). "Tanner, Thomas Hawkes". Dictionary of National Biography. Vol. 55. London: Smith, Elder & Co.
