= Sobasina coriacea =

Scientific classification
- Kingdom: Animalia
- Phylum: Arthropoda
- Subphylum: Chelicerata
- Class: Arachnida
- Order: Araneae
- Infraorder: Araneomorphae
- Family: Salticidae
- Genus: Sobasina
- Species: S. coriacea

Binomial name
- Sobasina coriacea Berry, Beatty & Prószyński, 1998

Species of spider

Sobasina coriacea is a species of jumping spider.

== Name ==
coriacea "leathery" refers to the presence of a dorsal abdominal scutum in the male.

== Distribution ==
Sobasina coriacea is only known from the Palau group of the Caroline Islands.
