= Tanners =

Tanners may refer to:

- Tanners (company), a British wine company
- Jerald and Sandra Tanner, opponents of the LDS Church (Mormons)
- The Tanners (novel), a 1907 novel by Robert Walser
- Leatherhead F.C., a football (soccer) club in Leatherhead, England
- a nickname for Peabody Veterans Memorial High School, a public high school located in Peabody, Massachusetts
- Tanners Brook Golf Club, A golf course known as "tanners" for short

== See also ==
- Tanner (disambiguation)
- Tanners' Bridge, an 18th-century Ottoman period stone footbridge located in Tirana, Albania
- List of Full House characters
