= Sobasina =

Scientific classification
- Kingdom: Animalia
- Phylum: Arthropoda
- Subphylum: Chelicerata
- Class: Arachnida
- Order: Araneae
- Infraorder: Araneomorphae
- Family: Salticidae
- Subfamily: Salticinae
- Genus: Sobasina; Simon, 1898

Type species
- S. amoenula Simon, 1898

Species
- 16, see text

Genus of spiders

Sobasina is a genus of jumping spiders that was first described by Eugène Louis Simon in 1898. These spiders look somewhat like ants, except for S. paradoxa, which looks more like a beetle.

== Species ==
As of August 2019 it contains sixteen species, found only in Oceania, Malaysia, and Indonesia:

- Sobasina alboclypea Wanless, 1978 – Solomon Is.
- Sobasina amoenula Simon, 1898 (type) – Solomon Is.
- Sobasina aspinosa Berry, Beatty & Prószyński, 1998 – Fiji
- Sobasina coriacea Berry, Beatty & Prószyński, 1998 – Palau (Caroline Is.)
- Sobasina cutleri Berry, Beatty & Prószyński, 1998 – Fiji
- Sobasina hutuna Wanless, 1978 – Solomon Is. (Rennell Is.)
- Sobasina magna Berry, Beatty & Prószyński, 1998 – Tonga
- Sobasina paradoxa Berry, Beatty & Prószyński, 1998 – Fiji
- Sobasina platnicki Prószyński & Deeleman-Reinhold, 2013 – Indonesia (Borneo)
- Sobasina platypoda Berry, Beatty & Prószyński, 1998 – Fiji
- Sobasina scutata Wanless, 1978 – Papua New Guinea (Bismarck Arch.)
- Sobasina solomonensis Wanless, 1978 – Solomon Is.
- Sobasina sylvatica Edmunds & Prószyński, 2001 – Malaysia
- Sobasina tanna Wanless, 1978 – Vanuatu
- Sobasina wanlessi Zhang & Maddison, 2012 – Papua New Guinea
- Sobasina yapensis Berry, Beatty & Prószyński, 1998 – Micronesia (Caroline Is.)
