= Sylvester Norris =

English Catholic writer and missionary

Sylvester Norris (alias Smith and Newton) (1570 or 1572 – 16 March 1630) was an English Roman Catholic writer and missionary priest.

== Life ==
Norris was born in Somerset. After receiving minor orders at Reims in 1590, Norris went to the Venerable English College, Rome, where he completed his studies and was ordained priest. In May 1596, he was sent on the English mission, and was one of the appellant clergy in 1600.

In the prosecutions following upon the Gunpowder Plot, Norris was committed to the Bridewell. From his prison he addressed a letter to the Earl of Salisbury, dated 1 December 1605. In the letter, Norris protested his innocence, and intending to prove his loyalty promised to repair Rome. He also declared that he would labor to bind all English Catholics to be unified and loyal subjects under the pope, and that hostages would be sent "for the afferminge [sic] of those things". As a result, in 1606 he was freed and exiled, along with 46 other priests, went to Rome, and entered the Society of Jesus.

He was later employed in the Jesuit colleges on the Continent, but in 1611 returned to the English mission. In 1621 was made superior of the Hampshire district, and lived there until his death.

== Publications ==
- An Antidote, or Treatise of Thirty Controversies; With a large Discourse of the Church (1622);
- An Appendix to the Antidote (1621);
- The Pseudo-Scripturist (1623);
- A true report of the Private Colloquy between M. Smith, alias Norrice, and M. Walker (1624);
- The Christian Vow;
- Discourse proving that a man who believeth in the Trinity, the Incarnation, etc., and yet believeth not all other inferior Articles, cannot be saved (1625).
