= Alfred Meadows =

English obstetric physician

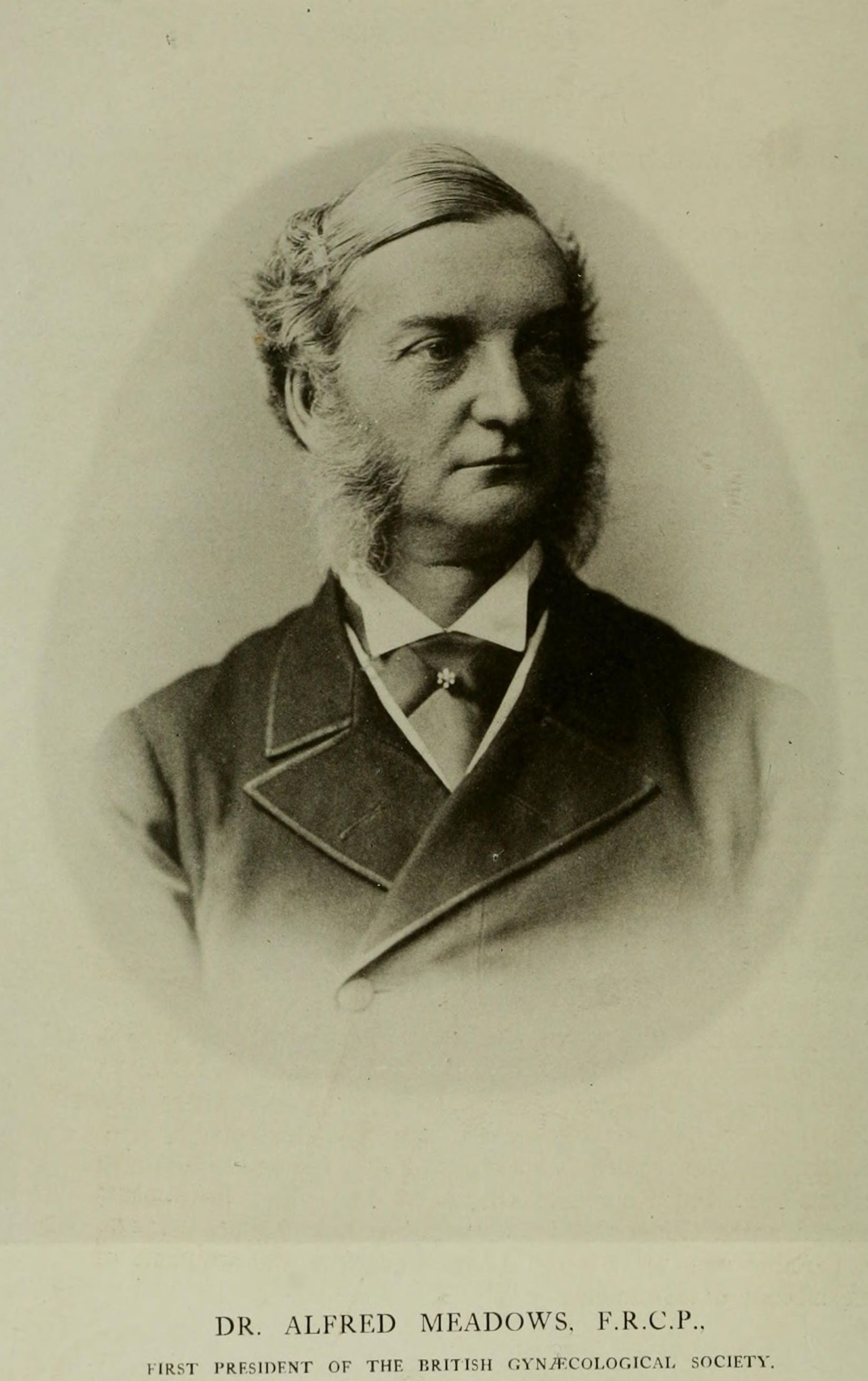
- Born: 2 June 1833; Ipswich
- Died: 18 April 1887 (aged 53)
- Occupation: Physician

Alfred Meadows (2 June 1833 – 18 April 1887) was an English obstetric physician.

== Biography ==
Meadows was born at born at Ipswich on 2 June 1833. He was fourth child of Charles Meadows. A brother, Robert (1839–1887), obtained a distinguished position in China as a medical man. Alfred was educated at the grammar school, Ipswich, and later at King's College, London, of which he was first associate and afterwards fellow. He matriculated at the London University in 1853, and after serving as pupil to William Elliston of Ipswich, he entered, in October 1853, the King's College medical school, where he obtained many prizes. In 1856 he was admitted a member of the Royal College of Surgeons of England and a licentiate of the Apothecaries' Hall. He also became a licentiate in midwifery of the Royal College of Surgeons. In 1857 he graduated M.B. of the university of London, and in the following year he became M.D., and in 1862 a member of the Royal College of Physicians of London; but it was not until 1873 that he was elected a fellow of that body. Immediately after obtaining his first qualifications to practice he held the offices of house-physician and resident midwifery assistant at King's College Hospital, and in 1857 he spent the winter in Paris.

Few men held a larger number of appointments than Meadows. The following are some of the more important. In 1860 he was assistant-physician for diseases of women and children at King's College Hospital; from 1863 until his resignation of the post in 1874 he was physician to the Hospital for Women, Soho Square. In 1871 he became physician accoucheur to St. Mary's Hospital, a post he held until his death, and was lecturer in the medical school on the diseases of women and children. He was elected the first president of the British Gynæcological Society on its foundation in 1884, and was a corresponding member of the German, Swedish, and Boston gynæcological societies. In 1878 he attended the crown prince of Sweden while he visited England, and in recognition of his services the king of Sweden, in 1881, made him a commander of the second class of the order of Wasa. He died on Tuesday, 18 April 1887, at his house in George Street, Hanover Square, and is buried at Colnbrook, Buckinghamshire.

Meadows was an active promoter of the Guild of St. Luke. He was an energetic freemason and an officer in grand lodge, and took a leading part in founding the University of London lodge. Sir Edward Sieveking says of him: ‘He was an active and energetic man, and he was able to bring to the contested field of practice those qualities which, combined with activity and energy, insured him a large amount of success. He was kind and hospitable in all his social arrangements, a good mechanician, clever in the adoption of means to an end, and skilful in the manipulative details of his department of practice.’

He published ‘A Manual of Midwifery,’ 3rd edit. London, 1876 (the second edition was translated in 1875 into Japanese and published in 12mo), and, with Dr. Tanner, a work on the diseases of children. He was translator of Bernutz and Goupil's ‘Clinical Memoirs on the Diseases of Women’ for the New Sydenham Society, vols. i. and ii. 1866. He edited the ‘London Medical Review’ in 1860.
