= Tanners (company) =

Wine merchants company based in Shrewsbury, England

Tanners Wine Merchants; Tanners Wines Ltd
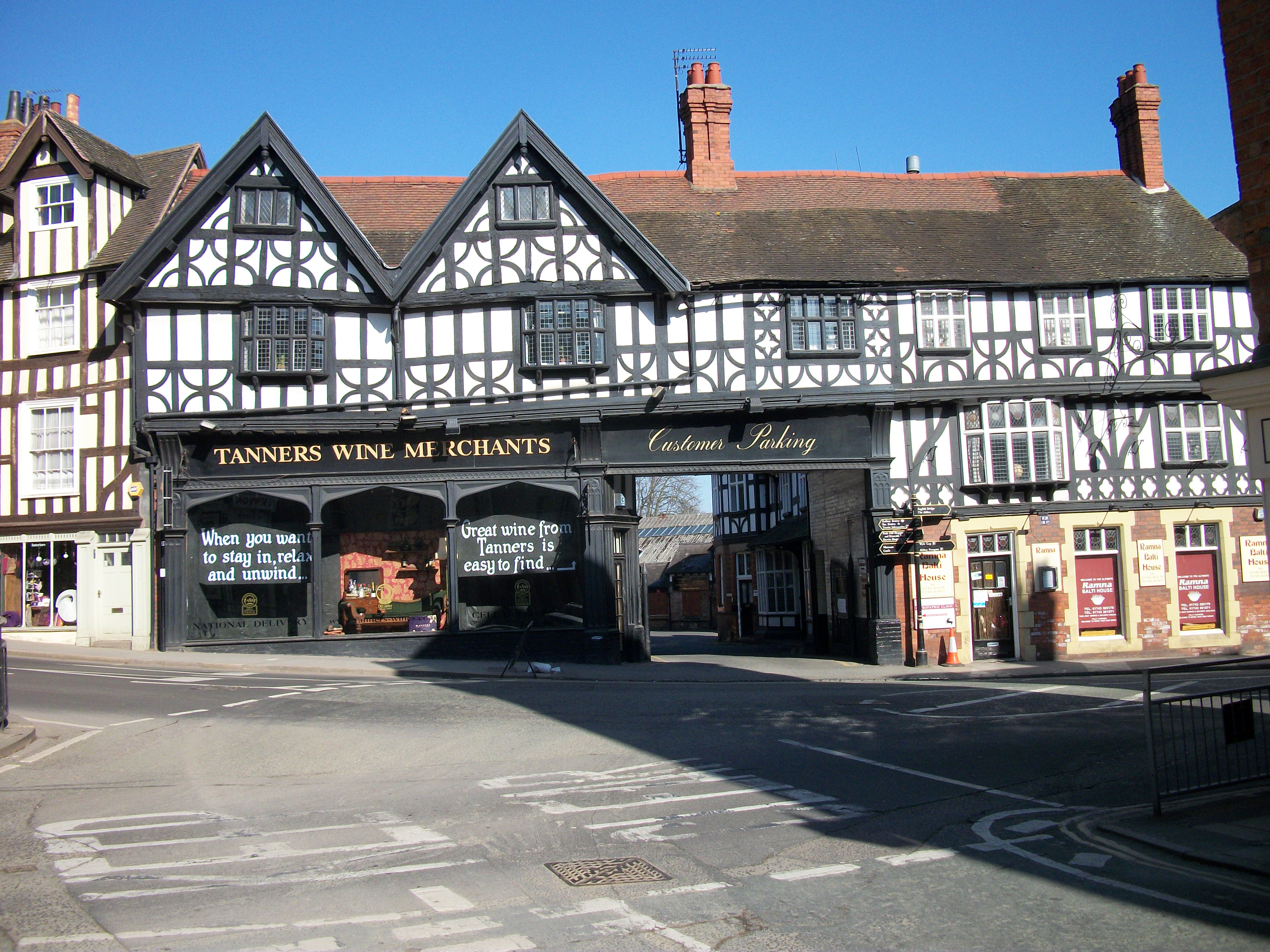
- The company's headquarters on Wyle Cop
- Company type: Private limited company
- Industry: Wholesaler and retailer of wines and spirits
- Founded: 1842; 184 years ago in Shrewsbury, England
- Founder: William Tanner
- Headquarters: 26 Wyle Cop, Shrewsbury, United Kingdom
- Revenue: ▲£20.5 million (2018); ▲£20.1 million (2017)
- Number of employees: 109 (2018)
- Footnotes / references Revenue

Tanners Wines Ltd (also known as Tanners Wine Merchants or simply Tanners) is a family-owned independent wine merchants company based in Shrewsbury, Shropshire, England.

== History ==
William Tanner

Tanners was established by William Tanner, a sea captain, hence the company's logo of a ship's decanter. Records exist of his voyages as far afield as Chile and Australia. The family were also well known breeders of Shropshire sheep and Hereford cattle.

It appears that William Tanner was not the only Tanner in the alcohol trade in the mid- to late-1800s. For instance, the Winchester wine merchant partnership between F. A. Roberts and E. Tanner was dissolved in 1886. In 1884 and 1885, published listings for "John Tanner, wine and spirit merchant" as an authorized agent for Southmolton appeared. In 1888, "Messrs. H. and E. Tanner, wine merchants" obtained a license for a new warehouse in Shrewsbury to replace their existing one.

Tanners has acquired and incorporated other businesses over time:

- Thomas Southam & Sons (established 1842 in Shrewsbury, acquired 1936); (Note: Thomas Southam & Sons was touted in an 1886 publication as being merchants of fine wine. See: Borderer (1886). Hunting and Sporting Notes in the West Midlands (Season 1885–86 ed.). London: A. H. Baily & Company. pp. 106–7 – via Internet Archive.)
- William Pulling & Co (estd 1760 in Ledbury and 1813 in Hereford, acquired 1978);
- Thomas Whitefoot (estd 1825 in Bridgnorth, acquired 1926);
- Welshpool Brewery (estd 1860, acquired 1912);
- Terry Platt Wine Merchants (estd 1962 in North Wales, acquired 2005).

The original Tanners cellars were underneath Shrewsbury's Victorian Market Hall (since demolished). When these were requisitioned during the Second World War the company moved its head office to its current premises in Wyle Cop, Shrewsbury, parts of which date back to the 1490s and are Grade II listed. These were the former premises of Thomas Southam & Sons and the firm operated for some years subsequently as ‘Tanner & Southam’.

Before the wine boom of the 1960s Tanners was also a beer wholesaler, bottling ale and minerals on its premises. From the 1880s the company acted as local agents for the Burton-brewed beers of Worthington & Co, latterly part of Bass. Butts of sherry, pipes of Port, hogsheads of claret and burgundy were shipped via London, Bristol or Liverpool and on by rail to Tanners for resting and bottling. Rum arrived in puncheons via Liverpool from Jamaica and Guyana and Irish whiskey was more popular than scotch.

Until the 1960s respectable wine merchants had no bottles on show, everything being ordered from wine lists. When Richard Tanner opened Shropshire's first self-select off licence in 1968 it was called ‘The Wine Centre’ to disassociate it from Tanners.

Tanners stopped bottling wines and beers on its own premises in 1976, ending an era of having bottled great wines such as Château Palmer 1961 and Taylor's Vintage Port 1963 amongst many others. Many artifacts, photographs and equipment are displayed as museum pieces within the buildings.

By September 1988, Tanners had opened two "Wine Markets", at Wyle Cop and in Bridgnorth, which featured hundreds of annotated wines.

Tanners employs just over 100 people with the majority split between its headquarters in Shrewsbury, and its distribution depot and bonded warehouse in Welshpool, Powys. In addition to a retail outlet in Shrewsbury, a second is found in Welshpool, and a further four at Bridgnorth, Hereford, Llandudno and more recently, Chester.

The Shrewsbury Cellars Shop was cited in Country Life magazine as one of the ‘ten most charming shops in Britain.’

The current chairman, James Tanner, is the fourth generation of the family to run the business. His father, Richard Tanner, High Sheriff of Shropshire in 2006, died on 1 January 2014.

== Products and services ==
=== Retail ===
Tanners sells over two million bottles of wine every year from over 20 wine producing countries as well as several million pints of beer and soft drinks annually.

The company specialises in fine French wines from Burgundy, Bordeaux and the Rhône, as well as wines from other regions of Europe and the New World. The firm also sells a range of French, German and Portuguese wines, as well as champagne, sparkling wine, Port, sherry, whisky and gin under its own label. Wines can also be purchased en primeur and stored with Tanners.

Tanners operates a UK-wide mail order service allowing customers to order wine by the single bottle, or mixed case by email, phone or post from its team of wine advisors.

The company also operates a commercial website.

=== Trade sales ===
Approximately 60% of Tanners business is with hotels and restaurants and 40% with private clients and corporate customers.

=== Events ===
Lately, the business has been running events, which include supper clubs and lectured events, which have covered topics including:

- Shakespeare
- The Marches
- Myths and Magic

== Culture and cultural references ==
The buildings were used in 1984 for the filming of ‘A Christmas Carol’ starring George C Scott, Susannah York and David Warner because of their Dickensian appearance.

== Memberships ==
Tanners is a member of the Wine and Spirit Trade Association, The Bunch, and The Merchant Vintners Company.

== Awards ==
=== International Wine Challenge Awards ===
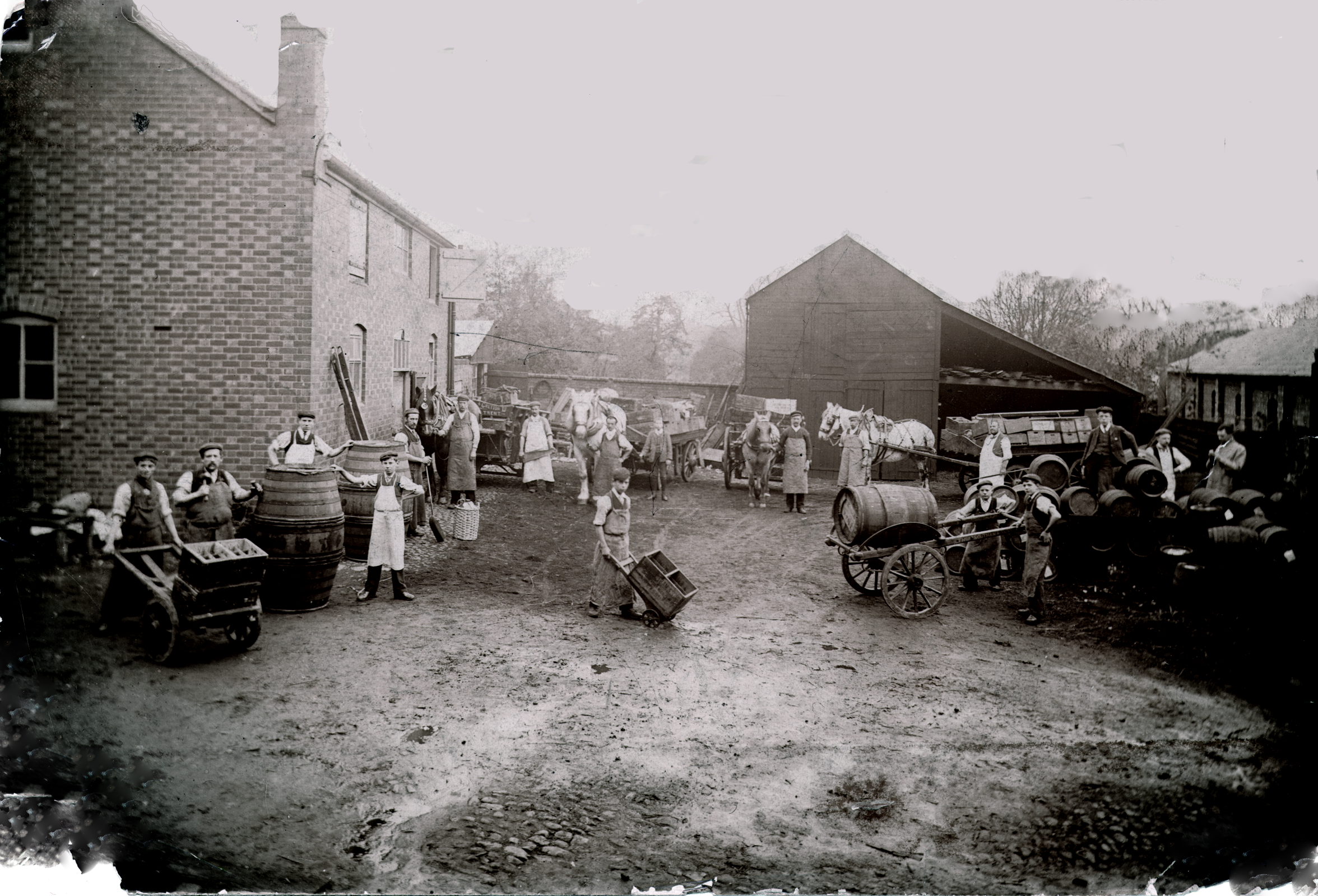
The Tanners Yard in the 19th Century

- UK's Large Independent Merchant of the Year 2017
- UK's Large Independent Merchant of the Year 2015
- Wine List of the Year 2010
- Central North Wine Merchant of the Year 2010
- Austrian and German Specialists 2009
- Large Independent Wine Merchant of the Year 2008
- Direct Wine Merchant of the Year 2008

=== Decanter World Wine awards ===
- UK Regional Wine Merchant of the Year 2011
- Independent Merchant of the Year 2009

=== Decanter Retailer Awards ===
- Outstanding Retailer of the Year 2016
- Large Retailer of the Year 2016
