= Tanna =

Tanna may refer to:

== Places ==
- Tanna (island), an island in Vanuatu
- Tanna, Germany, a city in Thuringia
- Tanna, former name of city of Thane in India

== People ==
- Tanna, singular form of tannaim, a Rabbinic sage recorded in the Mishna
- Tanna, a last name common among Lohanas
- Christian Tanna, a member of the rock band I Mother Earth
- Dan Tanna, fictional character, in the TV series Vega$ (1978–1981)
- Jagori Tanna, a member of the rock band I Mother Earth, brother of Christian
- Karishma Tanna, Indian actress
- Tanna Frederick, American actress

== Science ==
- Tanna (cicada), a genus of cicadas
- Tanna fruit dove, a bird endemic to Vanuatu
- Tanna ground dove, an extinct bird endemic to Vanuatu
- Tanna ornatipes, a genus of jumping spiders, synonym of Araneotanna

== Other ==
- Tanna, an Old High German word meaning oak from which the word tannin is derived
- Tanna (film), a 2015 film set on the island of Tanna, Vanuatu
- Tanna languages, a subgroup of the South Vanuatu languages

== See also ==
- Tana (disambiguation)
