= Araneotanna =

Scientific classification
- Kingdom: Animalia
- Phylum: Arthropoda
- Subphylum: Chelicerata
- Class: Arachnida
- Order: Araneae
- Infraorder: Araneomorphae
- Family: Salticidae
- Subfamily: Salticinae
- Genus: Araneotanna; Özdikmen & Kury, 2006
- Species: A. ornatipes

Binomial name
- Araneotanna ornatipes (Berland, 1938)

Synonyms
- Tanna ornatipes Berland, 1938

Genus of spiders

Araneotanna is a spider genus of the jumping spider family, Salticidae with only one species, A. ornatipes, that occurs only on the New Hebrides.

== Name ==
The genus was named Tanna until 2006, when it had to be replaced due to a conflict with a genus of the same name in the Hemipteran family Cicadidae, Tanna Distant, 1905.

Tanna is an island of Vanuatu. The salticid genus Efate is also named after an island of Vanuatu.
