= Science attaché =

Member of a diplomatic mission

A science attaché (also known as a scientific attaché or a technical attaché) is a member of a diplomatic mission, usually an embassy. A science attaché traditionally had three primary functions: advise the ambassador on scientific and technical matters, report on scientific and technological events, and represent their country in scientific and technical matters to foreign scientific and technical academies; to industry; to intergovernmental organizations and agencies; and to international non-governmental organizations.

In 1998, the National Academy of Sciences called for the appointment of more science-savvy diplomats to the State Department to improve the quality of the scientific advice available to foreign policymakers. The panel also emphasized the need to encourage general foreign service staff to acquire scientific skills. Science attachés could help scientists understand the host nation's science culture and practices.

Formerly, being appointed science attaché was viewed as the "kiss of death" for advancement within the foreign service. Though the perception may change from scientific issues such as global warming, global infectious diseases, and bioterrorism to foreign policymaking and diplomacy.

== Historical functions ==
The role of science attachés of the United States was first outlined in 1950 in a report entitled Science and Foreign Relations, issued by the United States State Department. It listed the primary duties of science attachés as:

1. Reporting on significant scientific and technological developments
2. Assistance in the exchange of scientific information
3. Assistance in the exchange of scientific persons
4. Assistance in the procurement of scientific apparatus, chemicals, and biologicals
5. Cooperation with all United States groups abroad having programs with scientific and technological aspects
6. General representations of United States science
7. Scientific and technical advice to the Embassy staff
8. Arrangements for collaborative research projects between the United States and foreign scientists
9. General promotion of better understanding between the United States and foreign science

== See also ==
- Ambassador
- Attaché
