= Michael Rabbet =

Michael Rabbet (or Rabbett) (c. 1562 – 5 February 1630) was an English clergyman and translator of the Authorised King James Version of the Bible.

== Life ==
He matriculated as a pensioner of Trinity College, Cambridge in 1572. He graduated B.A. in 1576, and M.A. in 1579. He was a Fellow and tutor at Caius College from 1579 to 1587, and proceed B.D. in 1586 . He was ordained on 8 February 1582, and was university preacher in 1587. He was rector of Cricket Malherbie, Somerset in 1581, and of Streatham, Surrey from 1585 onwards.

He was admitted at Gray's Inn on 20 February 1597, and was rector of St Vedast, Foster Lane, London, from 1604 to 1617. He is listed in the Second Westminster Company of the translators for King James. He died on 5 February 1630, aged 78.
