= O.C. Tanner =

O.C. Tanner may refer to:

- Obert C. Tanner (1904–1993), University of Utah professor of philosophy, philanthropist, and businessman
- O.C. Tanner (company), a business specializing in employee recognition programs, founded by Obert C. Tanner
