= List of war correspondents in World War I =

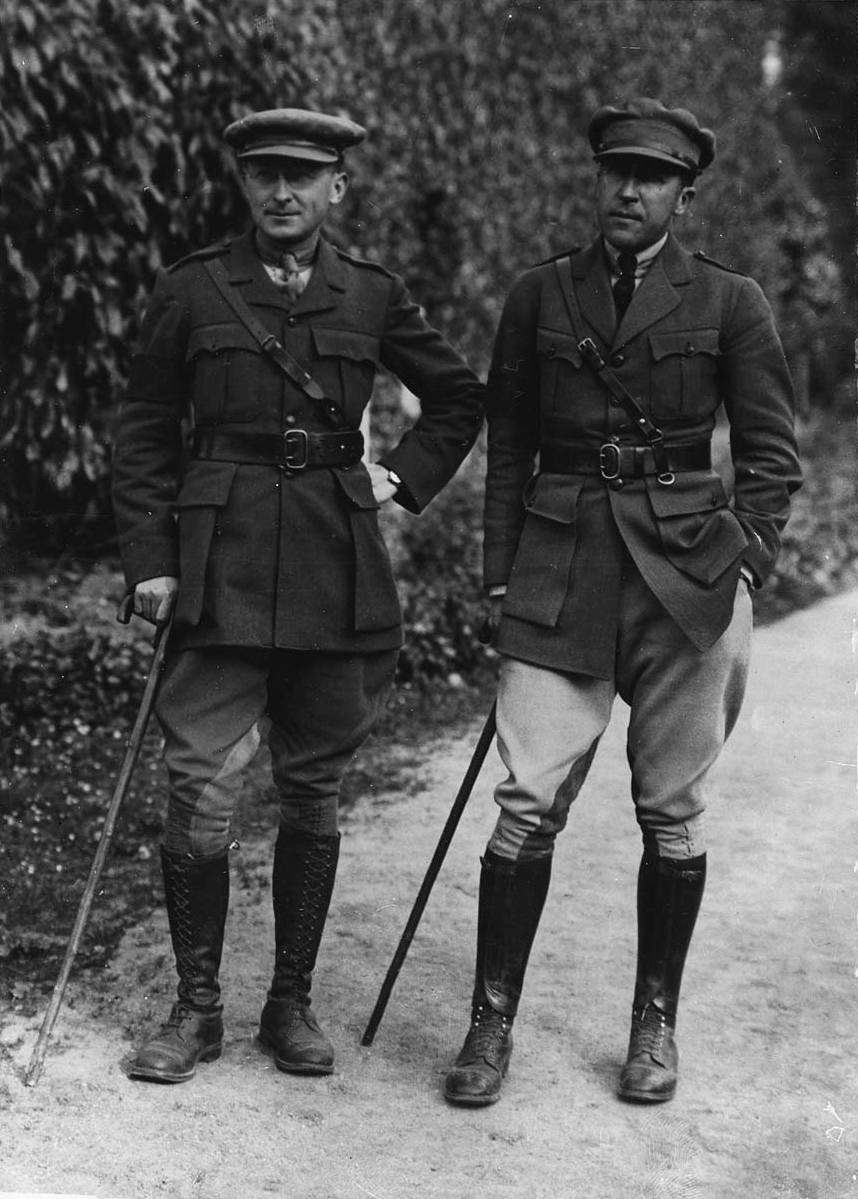
Two American war correspondents.

Press coverage of World War I was affected by restrictions on the movement of non-combatant observers and strict censorship. This raises the question of the role the media plays in selecting news about such conflicts. Events which support the position of either one of the protagonists in a conflict are understood as instrumental factors in the modern mediated conflict, and the publication of information on these events is construed as one of the major goals of the conflicting parties and one important activity of journalists.

In Britain, there were initially five official accredited war correspondents: Philip Gibbs, Percival Philips, Henry Perry Robinson, Herbert Russell, and William Beach Thomas. Their reports were vetted by C. E. Montague. Other writers and journalists who later received official accreditation from the British government were John Buchan, Robert Donald, Hamilton Fyfe, Henry Nevinson, and Valentine Williams.

== Partial list ==
- Ellis Ashmead-Bartlett, The Daily Telegraph
- Charles Bean, Sydney Morning Herald (New South Wales, Australia).
- Valery Bryusov, Russkiye Vedomosti, (Moscow).
- Gaston Chérau, L'Illustration
- Basil Clarke, Daily Mail
- Richard Harding Davis, Wheeler Syndicate (USA), Daily Chronicle (London)
- Albert K. Dawson, American photojournalist and film correspondent
- Rheta Childe Dorr
- Granville Roland Fortescue, Daily Telegraph (London)
- Hamilton Fyfe, Daily Mail (London).
- Floyd Gibbons, Chicago Tribune
- Philip Gibbs, The War Illustrated (London); Daily Chronicle (London).
- Louis Grondijs, Nieuwe Rotterdamsche Courant (Rotterdam); L'Illustration (Paris); Daily Telegraph.
- Henry Gullett (Australia)
- Corra Mae Harris, one of the first women war correspondents to go abroad for the war
- Bertie 'B J' Hodson, Central News Agency
- Peggy Hull, She was published in the Chicago Tribune (Army edition), along with the Junction City Daily Sentinel.
- Will Irvin, Collier's
- Edwin Leland James, The New York Times
- F. Tennyson Jesse, Collier's
- Robert Scotland Liddell, The Sphere
- Louise Mack, The Evening News, Daily Mail
- Gerald Morgan, Collier's
- Keith Murdoch, Melbourne Herald and Sydney Sun (Australia)
- E. Alexander Powell, New York World, Scribner's, Daily Mail
- Mikhail Prishvin, Rech, (Saint Petersburg).
- John Reed
- Charles à Court Repington, The Times
- Mary Roberts Rinehart, The Saturday Evening Post.
- Charles Patrick Smith, The Argus (Melbourne)
- Hermann Alfred Tanner, Basler Nachrichten
- William Beach Thomas, Daily Mail.
- Aleksey Tolstoy, Russkiye Vedomosti, (Moscow).
- Frederick Villiers, Illustrated London News.
- Alice Waterman

== See also ==
- List of participants to Paris Peace Conference, 1919
- Military attachés and observers in the Russo-Japanese War
- United Nations Military Observer
