= Rarahu =

Scientific classification
- Kingdom: Animalia
- Phylum: Arthropoda
- Subphylum: Chelicerata
- Class: Arachnida
- Order: Araneae
- Infraorder: Araneomorphae
- Family: Salticidae
- Genus: Rarahu
- Species: R. nitida

Binomial name
- Rarahu nitida Berland, 1929

Genus of spiders

Rarahu is a genus of jumping spiders endemic to Samoa. As of 2017, it contains only one species, Rarahu nitida. Berland probably adapted the genus name Rarahu from Pierre Loti's book of the same name, which was published in 1880. Loti himself either used the rare Tahitian word "rarahu", meaning (amongst other things) "to eat tapu things", or changed the name of the volcano "Raraku". The species name is from Latin nitida "shining", "handsome", or "neat" (a false cognate).
