= Hermann Alfred Tanner =

Swiss publisher and writer (1873–1961)

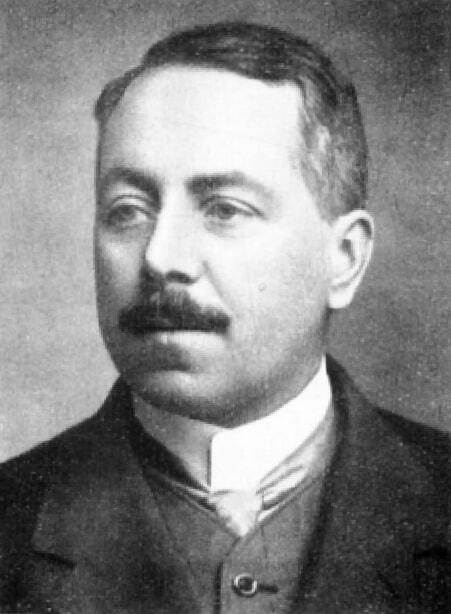
- Tanner in the 1938 Neue Schweizer Biographie
- Born: 16 October 1873; Bern, Switzerland
- Died: 1 September 1961 (aged 87); Bern, Canton of Bern, Switzerland
- Spouse: Clémence Tanner-Muller
- Father: Simon Tanner

Hermann Alfred Tanner (16 October 1873 – 1 September 1961), also known as Major Tanner, was a Swiss publisher, war correspondent, and author. Born in 1873 to a publisher father, he trained as a printer, before founding a newspaper company with his father. Tanner later was the director of several periodicals, primarily concerning winter sports in Switzerland. Tanner had an interest in colour theory, and patented a device for determining colour harmony in 1920.

During the First World War, Tanner was a war correspondent, reporting first in Eastern Europe, and later Italy; in Eastern Europe, he reported primarily on Galicia, and its surrounding areas. Alongside publishing, Tanner was a hobbyist mountaineer, publishing several books on the subject throughout his lifetime. He was also a supporter of the constructed language Occidental, and translated several books into the language. Tanner died in 1961 in Bern after a period of illness and mental decline.

== Career ==
Hermann Tanner was born on 16 October 1873 in Bern, Switzerland. His father, Simon Tanner, was a publisher, printer, and head of several Swiss newspapers, including the Romansh-language Fögl Ladin. Nothing is known about his mother other than that she was Romansh.

Hermann completed secondary school in Samedan, Graubünden, then went on to study business as well as Latin, Ancient Greek, and a few Slavic languages. Thereafter, he became an apprentice, working in Leipzig and Munich where he learned typography, drafting, composition, and other skills. From 1890, after his apprenticeship, Tanner worked as a photographer for his father's publishing company in Samedan. In 1901, Tanner became the first managing director of Engadin Press AG, which he co-founded with his father. From 1904, Tanner worked as a type founder, and from 1903 to 1907 was director of several sports periodicals, including Alpiner Wintersport and Ski. He founded Winter im Bergenland, a weekly periodical about winter sport in Bernerland, which was supported by user-submitted advertisements, articles, photographs, and subscriptions. Eventually, Tanner left his position managing his father's firm, to move to Bern, working as a writer and publicist.

Tanner was a major in the Swiss Army, specifically a commandant in the Swiss mountain troops, and was designated zur Dienstleistung (recalled to service). During the First World War, Tanner worked as a war correspondent for several Italian and Swiss newspapers. He covered a wide range of material through this, from the assassination of Archduke Franz Ferdinand in the earliest stages of the war to several series of reports, covering firstly theaters in Poland and Galicia, and the Italian front from 1915 to 1918. In early 1915, when visiting an army camp in Eastern Galicia, Tanner was described by Karl Boleslawski as:

ein ernster, militärisch hochgebildeter Offizier mit weitem Blick und sicherem, strenggerechtem und vor allem unparteiischem Urteile.
a serious, highly trained officer with a broad perspective, and a sure, strictly just and, above all, impartial judgement.

Tanner published his experiences under the title Front Messages of a Neutral (Frontberichte eines Neutralen) – they were received positively, with a review in Die Gartenlaube calling his work:

das beste und glänzendste Lob, das die österreichische Kriegsführung auch vollkommen verdient hat... Es ist eine frische, eigenartige, aus dem Selbsterleben geschöpfte Darstel lung jener fremdartigen Umwelt, Menschen und Dinge sind mit scharfem Blick er faßt.
the best and most brilliant praise truly deserved by the Austrian conduct in the war... it is a fresh, unique depiction, drawn from personal experience of that strange environment; people and things are captured with a keen eye.

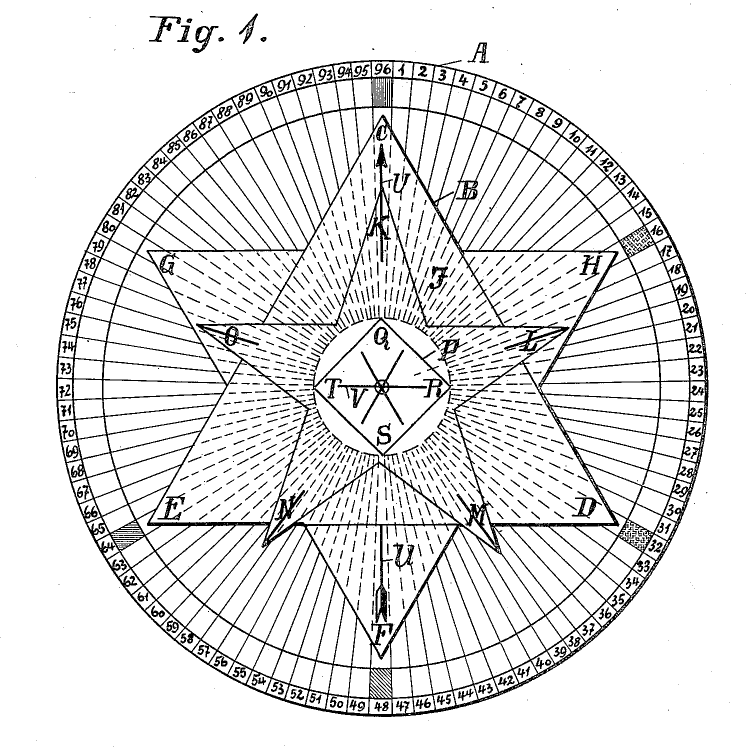
A colour compass by Tanner

Much of Tanner's work was published in the Basler Nachrichten; according to historian Piotr Bednarz, the cycles of reports by Tanner published in this newspaper covering Galicia and the parts of Ukraine under the Austrian Empire were characteristic of a Swiss interest at the time in "how the attitude of the Ukrainian or Ruthenian population would influence the ongoing offensive" – Tanner's first article covering this area of the war was about the fall of Przemyśl Fortress.

Beginning in 1893, Tanner had an interest in colour theory; he formed the basis of colour standardisation. Tanner created and patented a compass to display colour harmony and founded an association, Major Tanner's World-Colour Institute (Major Tanners Weltfarbinstitut) in 1927. Tanner participated in a study on chromesthesia presented at the 1927 International Music Exhibition Geneva (Internationalen Musikausstellung Genf). On 3 January 1920, Tanner filed a patent for a "Device For Quickly Finding Harmonious Color Combinations" in the United States; the device had a colour dial split into 96 tones; the dial was split by thirds into the primary colour set red, yellow, and blue. It showed secondary and tertiary colours, and shades of secondary colours, mixed with white, black, and grey.

== Personal life ==
A member of the Bernina branch of the Swiss Alpine Club, Tanner was a friend of mountain climber Christian Klucker, writing a pocket guide entitled "Forno-Albigna-Bondasca" with him in 1936. The guide, described as a monograph in a journal from the Club Alpino Italiano, included work by geologist Christian Tannuzzer and Gaudenz Giovanoli. Aside from use as a mountaineering guide, the book included information on the region's orography, botany, and the dialect of Val Bregaglia. Tanner was the owner of much of the collection of the Russian baron photographer Anton von Rydzewski, who created around two thousand glass and celluloid plate photographs of mountains in the region of Bergell. Part of Tanner's activities as a mountaineering enthusiast included verifying first ascent; for example, in October 1932, Tanner climbed Piz Badile to search for evidence of Giovanni Lurani having climbed the mountain in 1893. He was also a member of the Schweizerischer Werkbund, a Swiss association of artists, architects, and designers, and the Schweizer Schriftstellerverein (Swiss writers' association).

An Ido star

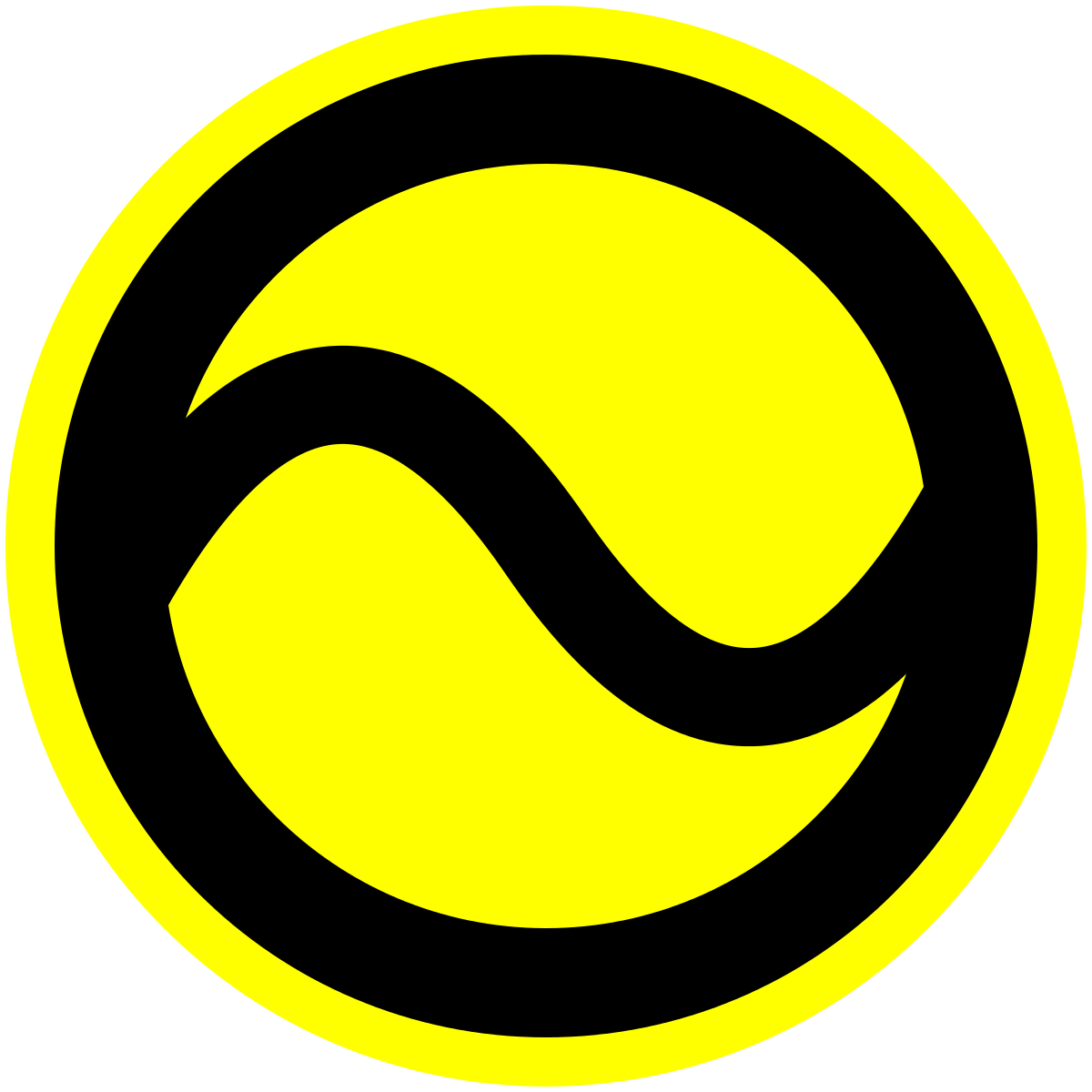
An Occidental tilde

Tanner was a supporter of the Romansh language, speaking it fluently and writing articles in the language, for example in Fögl Ladin. Additionally, he was a proponent of various international auxiliary languages, supporting Volapük, Esperanto, Ido and finally Occidental (later Interlingue) at various points. Tanner was purportedly very confrontational in his support, for example wearing the Ido star to an Esperanto Congress, and later an Occidentalist tilde to an Idist meeting. Joining the Occidental movement in 1928, Tanner was a member of the Swiss Association for Occidental (Occidental: Sviss Association por Occidental), and published multiple articles in the organisation's magazine, Helvetia. He translated Ric Berger's course Occidental in 5 lessons (Occidental in 5 leciones) into Romansh, and spread the language among the Romansh people. He also translated his book Ten Years of Mr Klucker's Mountain Guiding (Zehn Jahre Bergführer Kluckers «Herr»), a collection of quotes by Rydzewski, into Occidental (although this translation was not published).

Tanner was married to Clémence Tanner-Muller, who died on 30 March 1944. He died on 1 September 1961 in Tiefenau, Bern, after a period of mental decline and illness, partly due to chronic bone disease. Tanner had no children when he died, and was cremated, being buried with his wife in Saint-Imier.

== Works ==
Books

- Winter Pictures of Engadin (Engadiner Winterbilder) (1898)
- Contributions to the Development of the Southern Bergell Mountains and Guides for Forno-Albigna-Bondasca (Beiträge zur Erschließung der südlichen Bergeller Berge und Führer für Forno-Albigna-Bondasca) (1906)
- Front Messages of a Neutral (Frontberichte eines Neutralen), in three volumes:
  1. Poland and the Carpathians (Polen und Karpathen) (1915)
  2. Galicia and Bukowina (Galizien und Bukowina) (1916)
  3. Eastwards (Ostwärts) (1916)
- Mountain Journeys in Ladinia (South Tyrol), 1915–1916 (Bergfahrten in Ladinien (Südtirol), 1915–1916) (1921)
- Our Mountain Guides (Unsere Bergführer) (1933)
- Ten Years of Mountain Guide "Mr" Klucker (Zehn Jahre Bergführer Kluckers «Herr») (1934)
- Anton von Rydzewski as an Artist (Anton von Rydzewski als Künstler) (1934)

Reports

- With the Austrians in West Galicia and Southern Poland (Bei den Oesterreichern in Westgalizien und Südpolen), published in fourteen parts May 1915
- With the Southern German Army in the Carpathians (Bei der deutschen Südarmee in den Karpathen), published in eighteen parts, starting in June 1915
- On the Stryj (Am Stryj), published in thirteen parts, June–July 1915
- With the Böhm-Ermolli Army to Lemberg (Mit der Armee Böhm-Ermolli nach Lemberg), published eight parts, 25 July – 4 August
- The Russians in retreat in Eastern Galicia (Die Russen auf dem Rückzuge in Ostgalizien), published in three articles
