= Görgün Taner =

Turkish activist

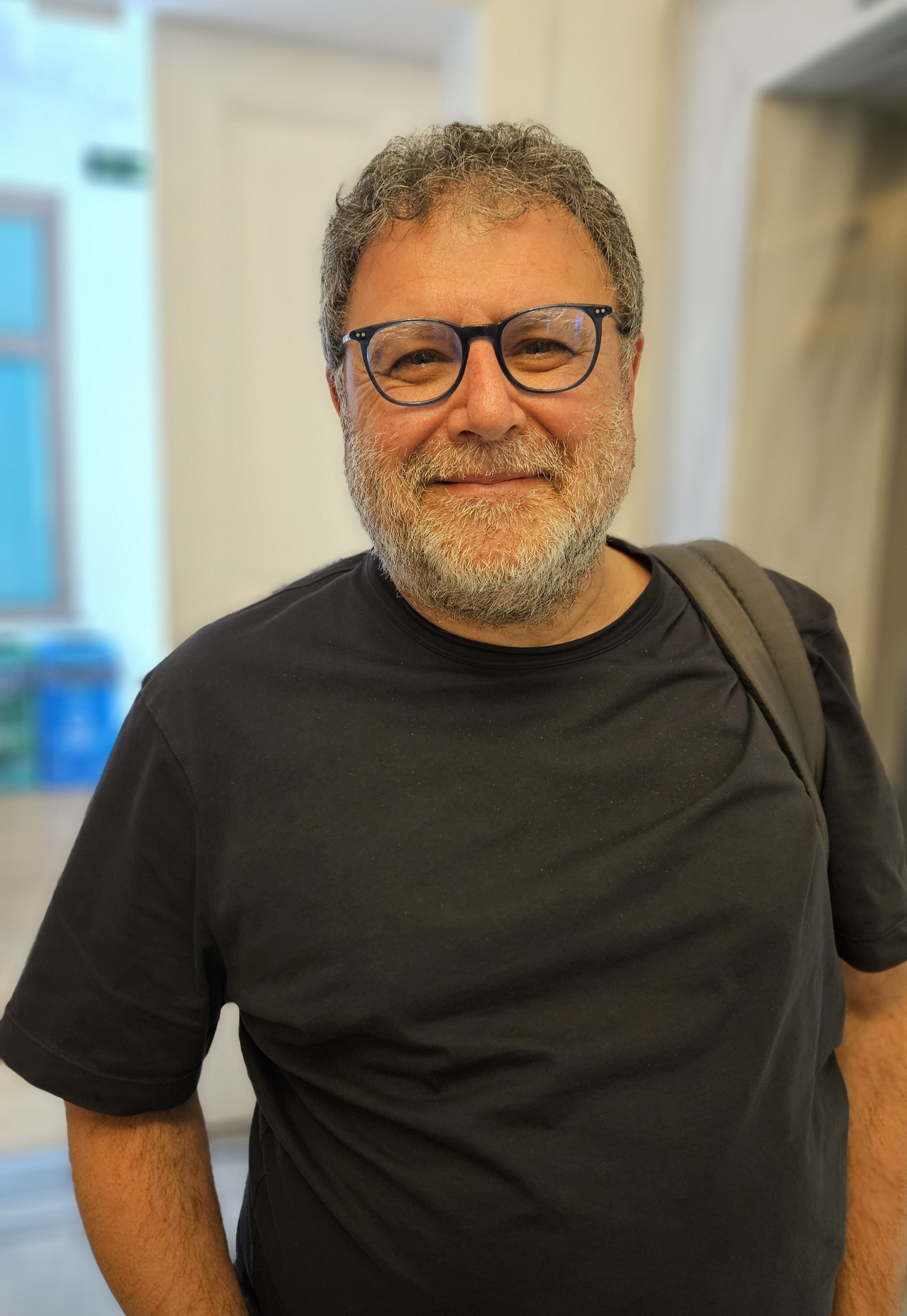
Görgün Taner at İKSV

Gorgun Taner (born 1959) is the general director of the Istanbul Foundation for Culture and Arts (İKSV), a non-profit, non-governmental organisation founded in 1973 that organises four international festivals (film, theatre, classical music and jazz), the Istanbul Biennial, and the Istanbul Design Biennial. He has been working at the foundation since 1983, where he first worked at Istanbul Film Days (renamed later as Istanbul Film Festival) as coordinator of Kent Movie Theater, and later served as assistant director and program coordinator for foreign relations of Istanbul Festival (1987–1994), director of Istanbul Jazz Festival (1994–2002), before being appointed as General Director in 2002.

A Boğaziçi University history graduate, Taner is currently a board member of Istanbul Modern Art Museum. He served as chairman of the European Cultural Foundation between 2013 and 2018, and as the president of the European Jazz Festivals Association between 1998 and 2002. He was a member of the advisory board of the Istanbul 2010 European Capital of Culture Agency.

He was the commissioner of Turkey during the Cultural Season of Turkey in France, between July 2009 and March 2010. Following this task, he was awarded by the French government with the Legion of Honour (Chevalier dans l’ordre national de la Légion d'honneur) in January 2011, and with membership to the French Ministry of Culture’s Order of Arts and Letters in 2014. He also received the Officer’s Cross of Merit, Superior Service to the Republic of Poland in 2014. He received the Dutch Knight of the Orange–Nassau by H.M. King Willem Alexander in September 2022.

Between September 2010 and May 2011, he was appointed the Art Consultant of the Amsterdam Municipality. He is a member of the international advisory committee of the Master of Management in International Arts Management at HEC Montréal since November 2012. Since 2014, he has been serving as a member of the Advisory Committee of German-Turkish Youth Bridge.
