= Matthias Tanner =

Czech Jesuit and writer

Matthias Tanner (Czech: Matěj Tanner, German: Mathias Tanner; 28 February 1630 – 8 February 1692) was a Czech Jesuit and writer.

== Biography ==
Matthias Tanner was born on 28 February 1630 in Plzeň, Bohemia. He entered the Society of Jesus in 1646. The greatest part of his life was spent at Prague, where he taught humanities, philosophy, theology, and Scripture, was made rector of the imperial university, and guided for six years the Bohemian province of his order.

Tanner frequently retold the stories of prominent Jesuits, hoping to inspire other members of his order to imitate them. He was also known for his extreme reverence while celebrating Mass; his biographer describes the sight attracting crowds to the altar.

He died in Prague on 8 February 1692.

== Works ==
Tanner wrote two Jesuit hagiographies:

- Societas Jesu ad sanguinis et vitae profusionem militans ("A history of the lives and deaths of those Jesuits who suffered martyrdom for the faith")
- Societas Jesu Apostolorum imitatrix (describing the history of Jesuit missionaries)

His other works include:

- Explanation of the Bloody Sacrifice of Christ in the Unbloody Sacrifice of the Mass (three editions)
- a pamphlet proclaiming God's wrath against those who should dare to desecrate holy temples by their misbehavior
- Dialogus controversisticus, a widely-read work on the validity of the Holy orders conferred on Andrew Frommens during the lifetime of his wife.
