= Thomas Tanner (writer) =

English clergyman and writer

Thomas Tanner (1630–1682) was an English clergyman and writer, the author of The Entrance of Mazzarini. Or; Some memorials of the state of France, between the death of the Cardinall of Richelieu and the beginning of the late regency (Oxford, 1657–58).

He was educated at St Paul's School, London, and at Pembroke Hall, Cambridge. He became a barrister and later a clergyman, being vicar of Colyton, Devon, and afterwards of Winchfield, Hampshire.
