= Spider fighting =

Blood sport involving spiders

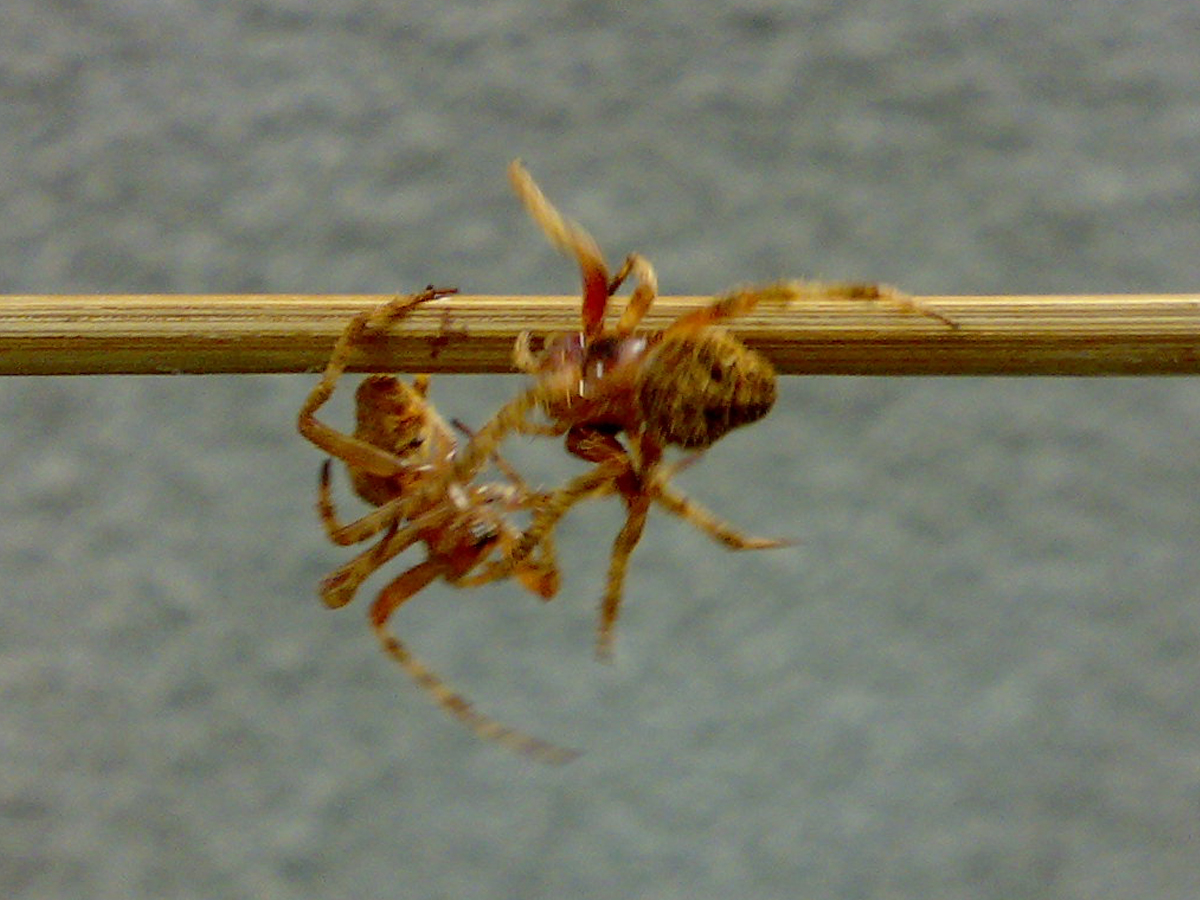
Two fighting spiders

Spider fighting or spider derby is a sport involving spiders that occurs in different forms in several areas of the world. Among them are the Philippines, Japan, Singapore and Malaysia. The fights that occur in the Philippines and in Japan are staged between females of various species of web weavers. Female spiders will kill a rival if the loser does not quickly flee or receive the aid of a human handler. The contests that are staged in Malaysia and Singapore are fights between male jumping spiders. The males fight only for dominance, and ordinarily the loser will flee, though sometimes they will lose a leg in the fight.

In the Philippines, spider fighting (Hiligaynon: paupas sang damang; Cebuano: paaway kaka or sabong sa kaka) is staged between female orb-weavers from the genus Neoscona. In Japan, the contests occur at an annual festival and use females of the genus Argiope. In Japanese these contests are called Kumo Gassen (spider battles). In Malaysia, they use males of the genus Thiania - most commonly the species Thiania bhamoensis - although another species of that genus may sometimes be used. Like cockfighting, spider fighting is a sport that usually involves betting and events occur frequently. In Malaysia, they are known as "fighting spiders" in English, dòu bào hǔ (Chinese: 鬥豹虎) in Mandarin and Cantonese, and memerangi labah-labah in Malay.

== Philippines ==
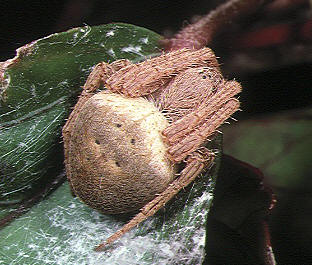
Neoscona punctigera, one of the most common species caught for spider derbies in the Philippines

Spider fighting or spider wrestling (Hiligaynon: pahibag sang damang; Cebuano: paaway kaka or sabong sa kaka; Mindanao Cebuano: sabong sa damang) is a popular blood sport among rural Filipino children, especially in the Bisaya region. The game begins by placing two spiders at opposite ends of a stick. The spiders are then prodded to move along the length of the stick until they encounter each other and fight.

=== Catching ===
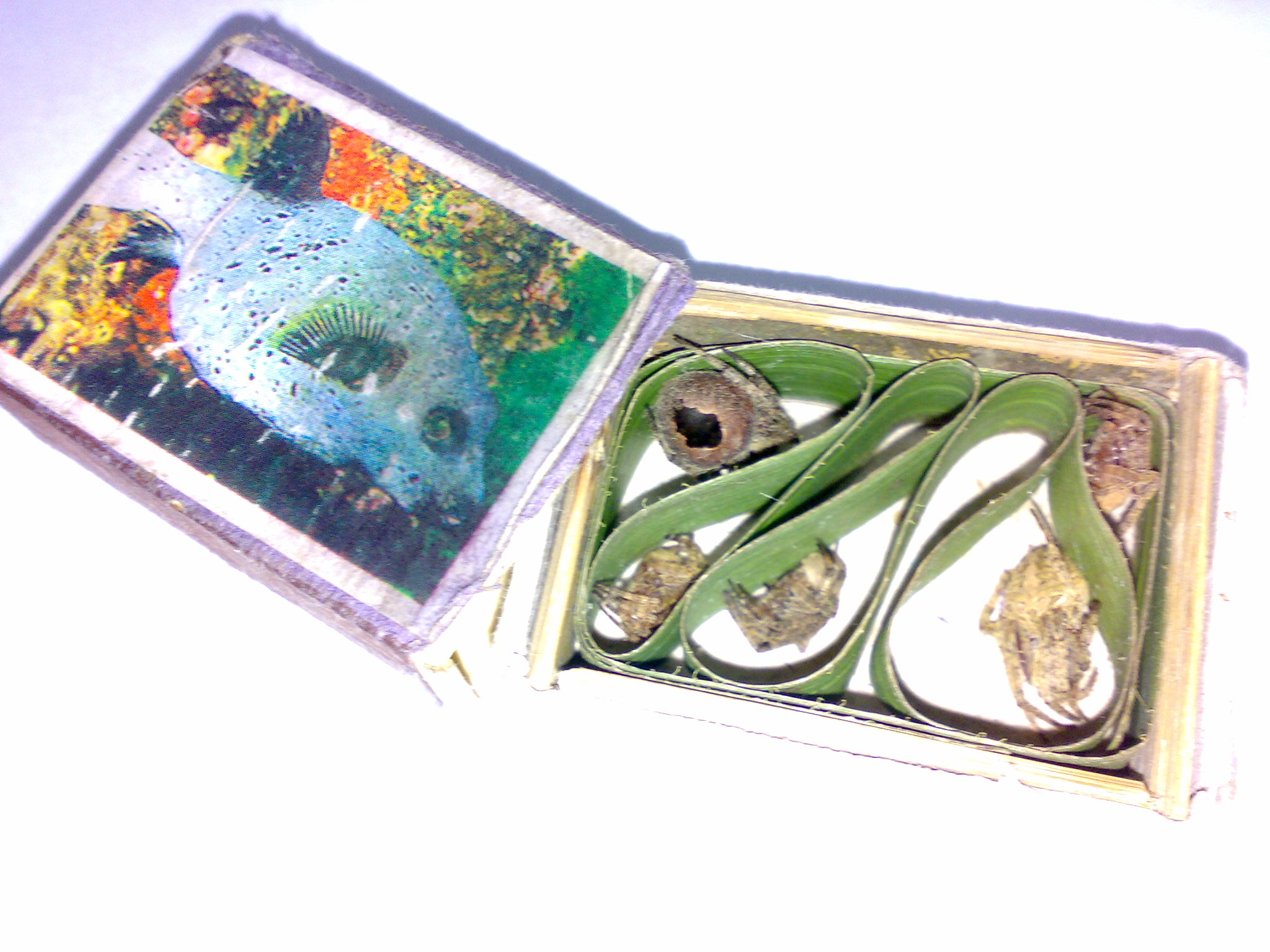
Matchbox serving as a 'stable' for fighting spiders in between derbies

Spiders suitable for spider fighting are almost always adult female orb-weavers from the genus Neoscona. Only the spiders coming from this genus are called damang or kaka (or in English as "derby spiders" or "fighting spiders"). The most commonly utilized species is Neoscona punctigera, but other species used include: Neoscona aldinei, Neoscona ampoyae, Neoscona facundoi, Neoscona lipana, Neoscona marauoyi, Neoscona nautica, Neoscona rumpfi, Neoscona shereeae, Neoscona theisi, and Neoscona vigilans.

The spiders are usually caught in trees and bushes in the early morning or during dusk when the spiders come out to spin webs. After capture or in-between fights, the spiders are stabled in used matchboxes. These matchboxes usually have separate cells to house several spiders. The cells are normally made from discarded cardboard or a single blade of coconut leaf bent several times inside the matchbox. Some trainers assemble a "langsaranan" where the spider is released to a plant enclosed by a net or a plastic bottle with tiny holes.

=== Fighting ===
Most spider fights are done with a single piece of dried coconut leaf midrib (usually taken from a broom made from such midribs; Cebuano: gungi, Tagalog: walis tingting) or bamboo. Spiders are placed at both ends and encouraged to move toward each other and fight. The sticks are thin enough to ensure that the spiders have no choice but to meet. It is held by one child who ensures that the spiders do not escape by alternately switching grip from one end to the other. How a fight ends is agreed upon beforehand. Fights to the death will end with one spider being bitten, paralyzed, and swiftly wrapped in silk. Non-lethal matches end when one spider falls from the stick (once or several times, depending on the agreement). Occasionally, the child holding the stick may need to quickly intervene in a non-lethal fight to prevent the winning spider from eating the losing spider.

Spider derbies called "kaka" are held in an arena made of two poles connected by a tight string. Underneath is a padding (usually polystyrene foam) to ensure that the spiders are not injured in case they fall down.

=== Legal issues ===
The practice is now generally discouraged since it affects the educational performance of school children. Top fighters can fetch up to 100 pesos (US$ 2), making the sport lucrative for children. They could spend so much time hunting and training spiders that lessons and homework are neglected. Adults also play the sport but in a way similar to cockfighting. Derbies are also held and bets could go as high as 50,000 pesos (about US$1,000). The cheaper maintenance cost of raising spiders compared to raising fighting cocks caused some players to switch to spider fighting.

Ordinances against the sport are now in effect in some cities. In the Negros Occidental province, spider derbies are treated as a threat to public morals. The Bacolod police provincial director issued an order warning residents of participating in a form of illegal gambling. The police also say that spider fighting in itself is not illegal as a pastime, but it will be considered illegal once people place bets on the fights.

== Japan ==
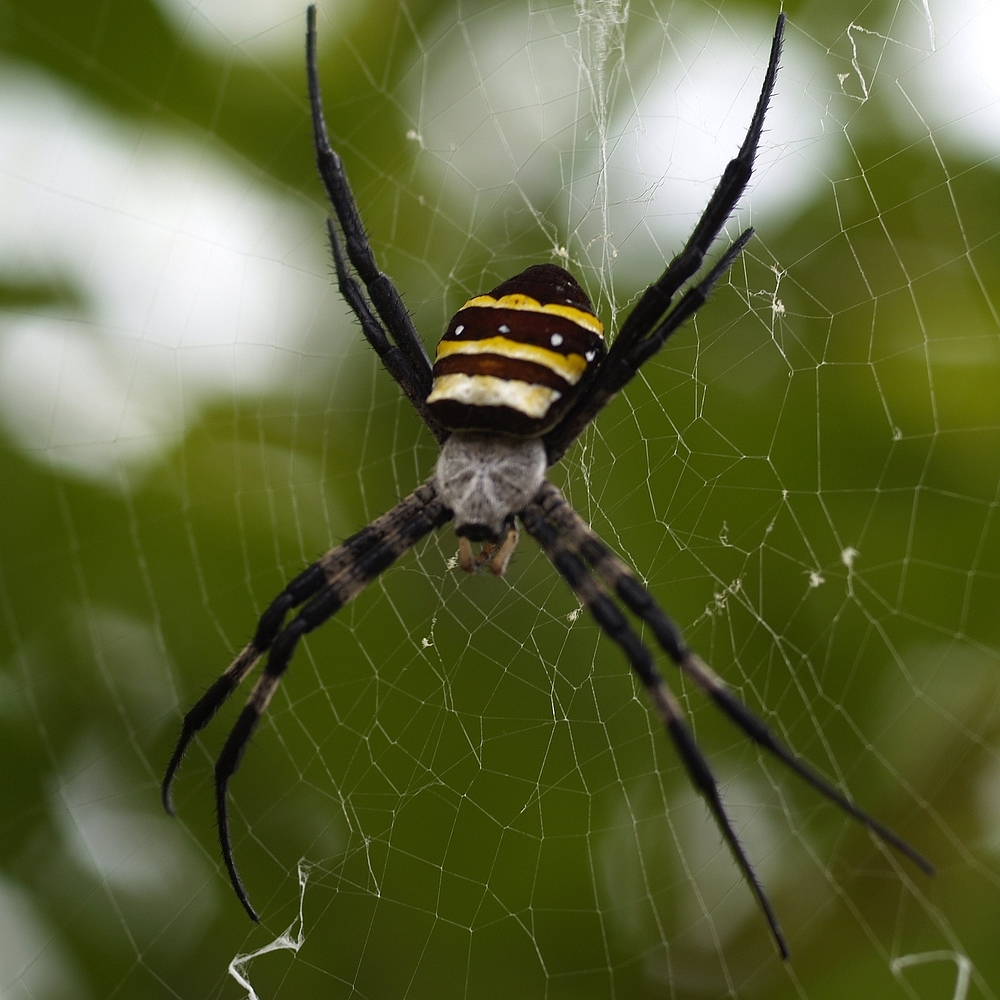
Argiope amoena

An annual spider fighting contest called Kumo Gassen is held in Kajiki, Kagoshima, Japan. The spiders used in this contest belong to the genus Argiope. This form of spider fighting is said to have been around as far back as the 16th century. It is done in a similar manner to Philippine spider-fights. One spider, designated as the "Kamae" is placed on the end of a stick, while another spider called the "Shikake" is placed on the other end. The spiders will then fight each other in the middle. The contest is a tournament, with the last two victorious spiders fighting each other in the finale.

== Singapore and Malaysia ==
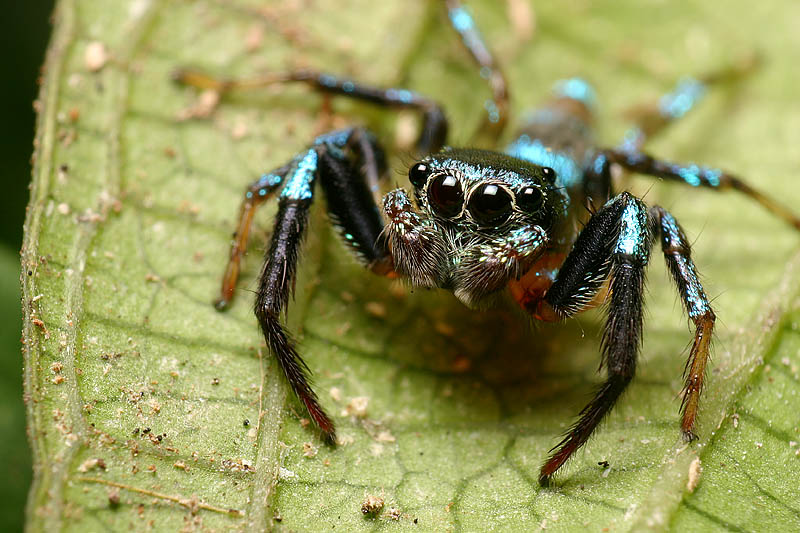
Thiania bhamoensis

Spiders used in spider derbies in Singapore and Malaysia come from the species Thiania bhamoensis (also called "Fighting Spider"), a jumping spider. The practice has been the subject of a memoir entitled Spider Boys, and a popular television series in Singapore called Fighting Spiders. Capturing, admiring, nurturing, and staging fights among these spiders is a popular activity among many young people. In some instances, the practice had a relatively large financial impact on those young people who participate in these practices both because of the sale value of a strong contender and also because of the bets made on their fights. Mainly in the 60s, 70s.

== United States ==
In the United States, spider-fighting is also prevalent in prisons in Florida, where inmates catch them and keep them in boxes as pets. In 2002, a fight between three inmates over the theft of a pet spider resulted in life-threatening skull injuries to one inmate and additional charges to the other two.

== Gallery ==
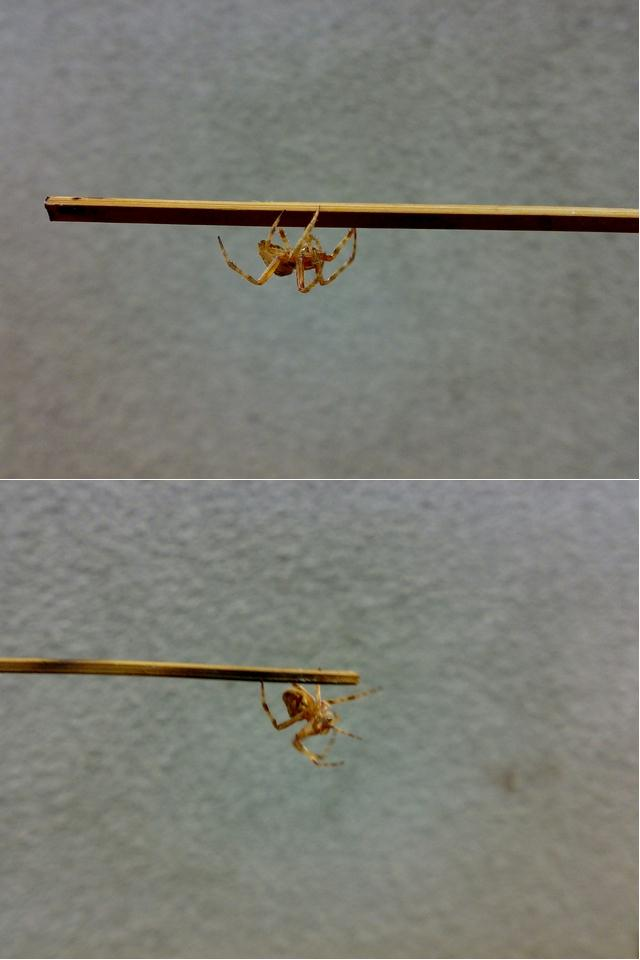
Two fighting spiders of approximately equal size and weight are placed at opposite ends of a bamboo skewer

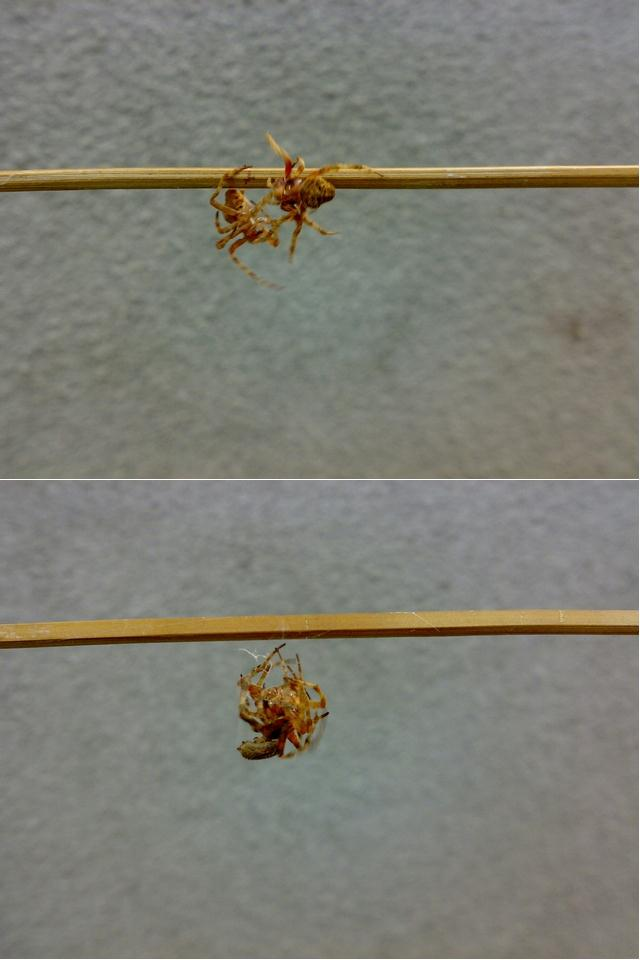
Top frame: Both spiders size each other up; Bottom frame: The spiders grapple; at this point, one of the spiders may have already delivered a paralyzing bite to its opponent's body

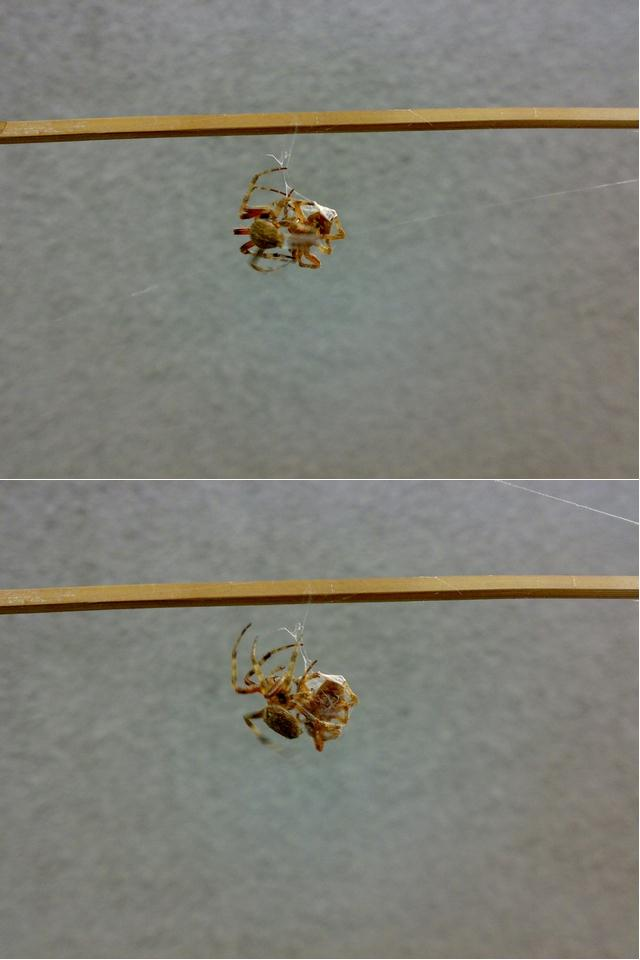
The victor begins to wrap its victim in silk. Spinnerets are visible

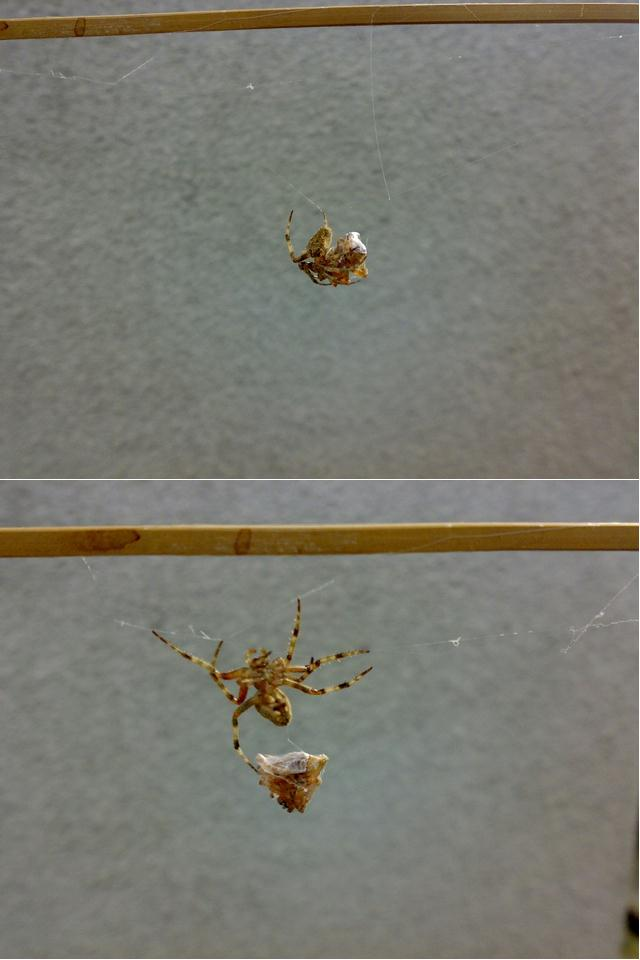
Top frame: The victor may be delivering another bite to its wrapped opponent; Bottom frame: The victor climbs up its dragline, dragging the wrapped victim behind using one of its hind legs

== See also ==
- Cricket fighting
- Insect fighting
