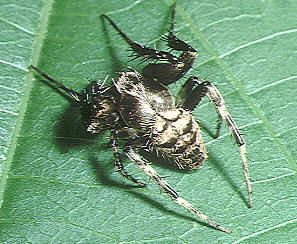

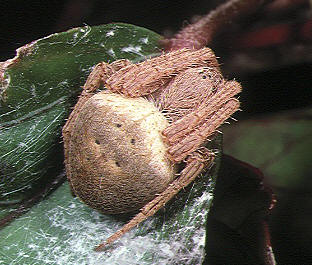
- Male (above) and female (below) from Okinawa

Scientific classification
- Domain: Eukaryota
- Kingdom: Animalia
- Phylum: Arthropoda
- Subphylum: Chelicerata
- Class: Arachnida
- Order: Araneae
- Infraorder: Araneomorphae
- Family: Araneidae
- Genus: Neoscona
- Species: N. punctigera

Binomial name
- Neoscona punctigera (Doleschall, 1857)

Synonyms
- Epeira punctigera Doleschall, 1857

= Neoscona punctigera =

Species of orb-weaver spider

Neoscona punctigera is a widespread species of orb-weaver spider found from Japan to mainland Asia, Australia and several Western Indian Ocean islands.

The female reaches about 1.1 cm (0.43 in) and the male about 0.7 cm (0.28 in). It is well-camouflaged during the day when sitting on bark, but when it hunts during the night it sits in the web and attracts insect prey with its bright, contrasting spots on the underside of the abdomen. N. punctigera builds spiral shaped webs.

This spider and close relatives (for example, N. vigilans) are commonly found in the Philippines, where the females are frequently used for spider fighting.
