= Thianitara =

Scientific classification
- Kingdom: Animalia
- Phylum: Arthropoda
- Subphylum: Chelicerata
- Class: Arachnida
- Order: Araneae
- Infraorder: Araneomorphae
- Family: Salticidae
- Subfamily: Salticinae
- Genus: Thianitara; Simon, 1903

Type species
- T. spectrum Simon, 1903

Species
- T. spectrum Simon, 1903 – Malaysia, Indonesia (Sumatra); T. thailandica Prószyński & Deeleman-Reinhold, 2012 – Thailand

Genus of spiders

Thianitara is a genus of Southeast Asian jumping spiders that was first described by Eugène Louis Simon in 1903. As of August 2019 it contains only two species, found in Thailand, Indonesia, and Malaysia: T. spectrum and T. thailandica. It was briefly considered a junior synonym of Thiania until 2017, when it was revived by Jerzy Prószyński.

Prószyński placed Thianitara in his informal group "euophryines". When synonymized with Thiania, it was placed in the large tribe Euophryini, part of the Salticoida clade of the subfamily Salticinae in Maddison's 2015 classification of the family Salticidae.
