= Thianella =

Scientific classification
- Kingdom: Animalia
- Phylum: Arthropoda
- Subphylum: Chelicerata
- Class: Arachnida
- Order: Araneae
- Infraorder: Araneomorphae
- Family: Salticidae
- Subfamily: incertae sedis
- Genus: Thianella; Strand, 1907, nomen dubium
- Species: T. disjuncta

Binomial name
- Thianella disjuncta Strand, 1907, nomen dubium

Genus of spiders

Thianella is a possible monotypic genus of jumping spiders containing the single species, Thianella disjuncta. It was first described by Embrik Strand in 1907, and is found only on Java. Based on a male specimen, Roewer placed it close to Thiania, but his placements of salticids have often been questionable and no drawings currently exist. The name is an alteration of the salticid genus Thiania, and the species name is from Latin disiunctus "separated". The World Spider Catalog regards the genus and species names as nomina dubia (dubious names).

In 1963, Schenkel named a new genus "Thianella", but this was invalid because of the prior existence of Strand's Thianella. The replacement name Tasa was put forward by Wanda Wesołowska in 1981.
