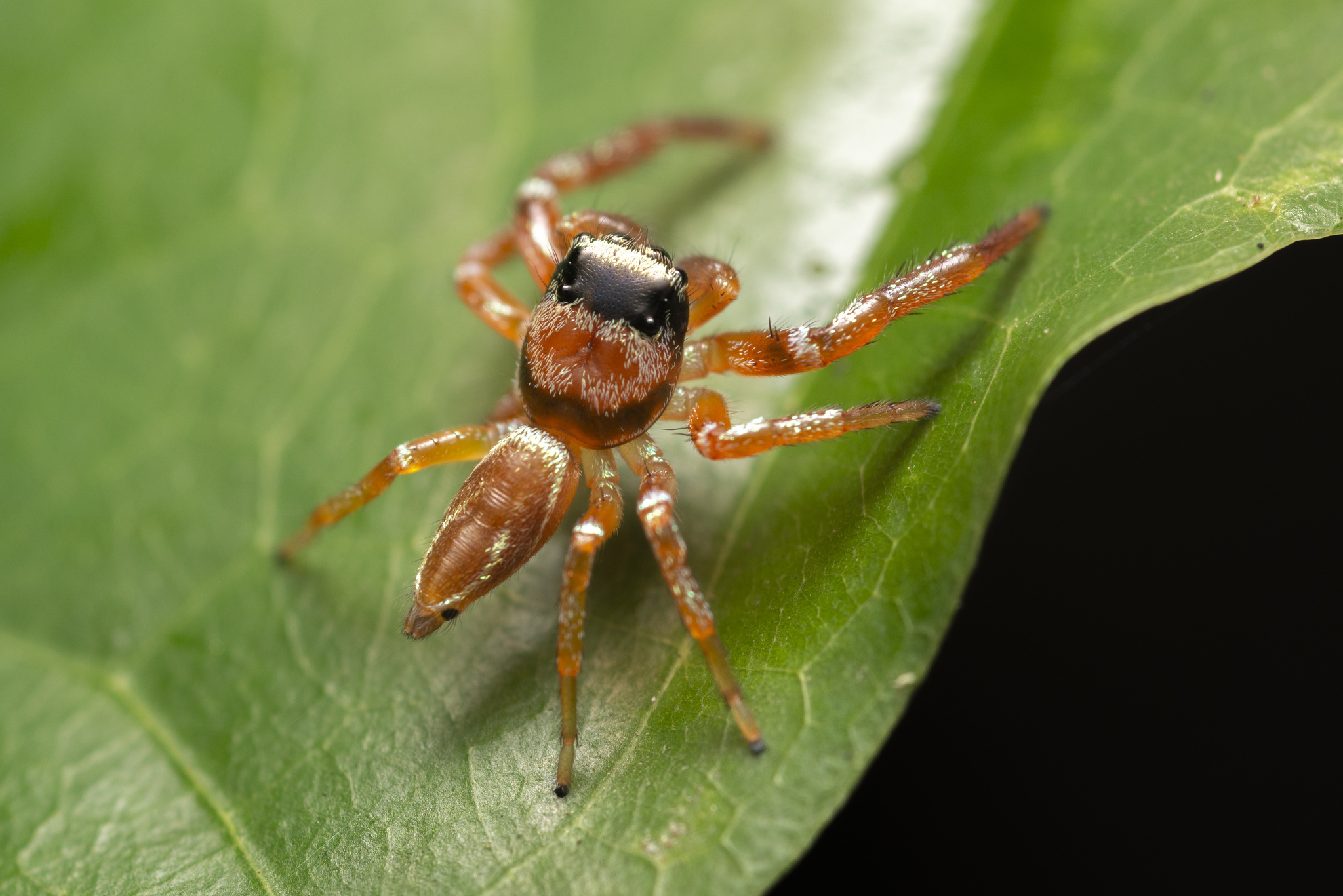
- Female
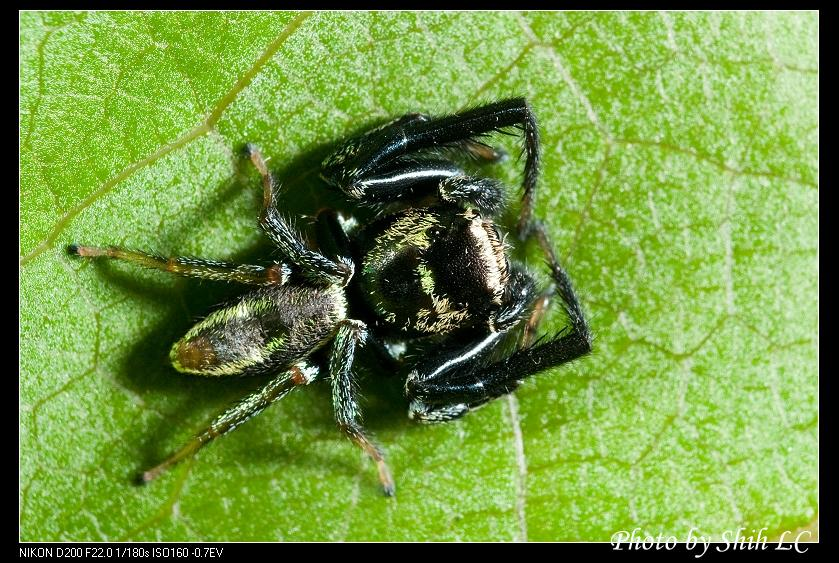
- Male

Scientific classification
- Kingdom: Animalia
- Phylum: Arthropoda
- Subphylum: Chelicerata
- Class: Arachnida
- Order: Araneae
- Infraorder: Araneomorphae
- Family: Salticidae
- Genus: Thiania
- Species: T. suboppressa

Binomial name
- Thiania suboppressa Strand, 1907

= Thiania suboppressa =

Species of jumping spider

Thiania suboppressa is a species of jumping spider in the genus Thiania. It was first described by Embrik Strand in 1907.

== Distribution ==
Thiania suboppressa has a wide distribution across East Asia, including Japan, China, and Vietnam. The species has also been introduced to Hawaii.

== Description ==
The original description by Strand notes sexual dimorphism in the species. Males are larger at 7.5 mm in length, while females measure 8.5 mm. The male has distinctive features including mandibles that are only slightly longer than broad and nearly hairless at the tip, with deep transverse striping. The patella is slightly longer than broad and rounded at the end, while the tarsus is considerably longer than the two preceding segments combined.

The female cephalothorax measures 3.4 × 2.7 mm, with the abdomen measuring 5 × 2.7 mm. Leg measurements for the female are: I. 8.1; II. 6.8; III. 6.9; IV. 7.4 mm. The patella and tibia of leg IV together measure 2.2 mm, with the tibia alone measuring 2.7 mm.

== Taxonomy ==
The species was originally described from specimens collected in Swatow (modern-day Shantou), China, by Streich. The type material was deposited in the Staatliches Museum für Naturkunde, Stuttgart (SMNS), Germany, but was destroyed in 1944.
