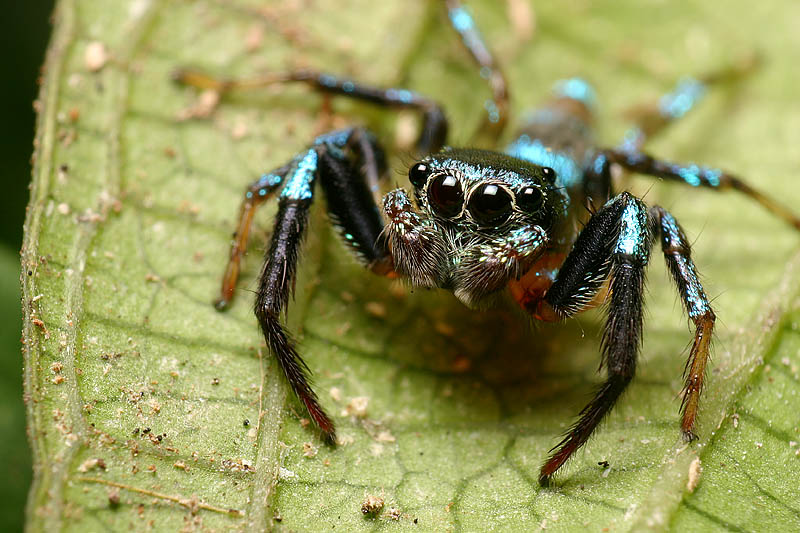

Scientific classification
- Kingdom: Animalia
- Phylum: Arthropoda
- Subphylum: Chelicerata
- Class: Arachnida
- Order: Araneae
- Infraorder: Araneomorphae
- Family: Salticidae
- Genus: Thiania
- Species: T. bhamoensis

Binomial name
- Thiania bhamoensis Thorell, 1887

Synonyms
- Marptusa oppressa Thiania oppressa

= Thiania bhamoensis =

Species of spider

Thiania bhamoensis is a species of jumping spider.

== Description ==
The species is iridescent green-blue. Females are more green, males more blue. From the front view, the female's face are black. And the males are white.

Nicylla sundevalli, which also occurs in Burma, is said to be very close to this species.

== Behavior ==
These spiders build a silken retreat by binding a pair of green leaves together, where they rest, moult and lay their eggs, which is unusual for a jumping spider. Making a single rivet to attach the leaves takes about half an hour. About four to ten rivets are arranged in a roughly elliptical manner. These nests are built by both sexes and juveniles. Although T. bhamoensis can be found on many kinds of plants, it most often chooses Crinum asiaticum (spider lily).

The white elliptical egg sacs are about two to three times the size of the spider and are attached inside the nest.

Twelve different displays were identified during fights between males, including pushing, possibly to assess the weight of the other male.

== Distribution ==
This species occurs from Burma to Sumatra.

== Fighting spider ==
Because two males will readily fight each other, either in a natural setting, or if put together, they are commonly known as "fighting spider" in South-east Asia. These spiders are commonly kept in matchboxes with a piece of green leaf and a spat of saliva for moisture. A spider that wins fight after fight gets the status of "first king". A common belief is that the darkest males are most aggressive.

In a laboratory setting, males were kept in small containers (9 cm diameter, 6.5 cm high) and provided with moist leaves for retreat building, moist cotton and three adult Drosophila melanogaster three times a week.

== Name ==
The species name of this spider literally means "From Bhamo", referring to Bhamo, a city in northern Burma.

== See also ==
- Spider fighting
