= Thiania pulcherrima =

- 1846 drawing of male

Scientific classification
- Kingdom: Animalia
- Phylum: Arthropoda
- Subphylum: Chelicerata
- Class: Arachnida
- Order: Araneae
- Infraorder: Araneomorphae
- Family: Salticidae
- Genus: Thiania
- Species: T. pulcherrima

Binomial name
- Thiania pulcherrima C. L. Koch, 1846

Species of spider

Thiania pulcherrima is a species of spider of the genus Thiania. It is found from Sri Lanka, Vietnam, Malaysia, and Sulawesi.
