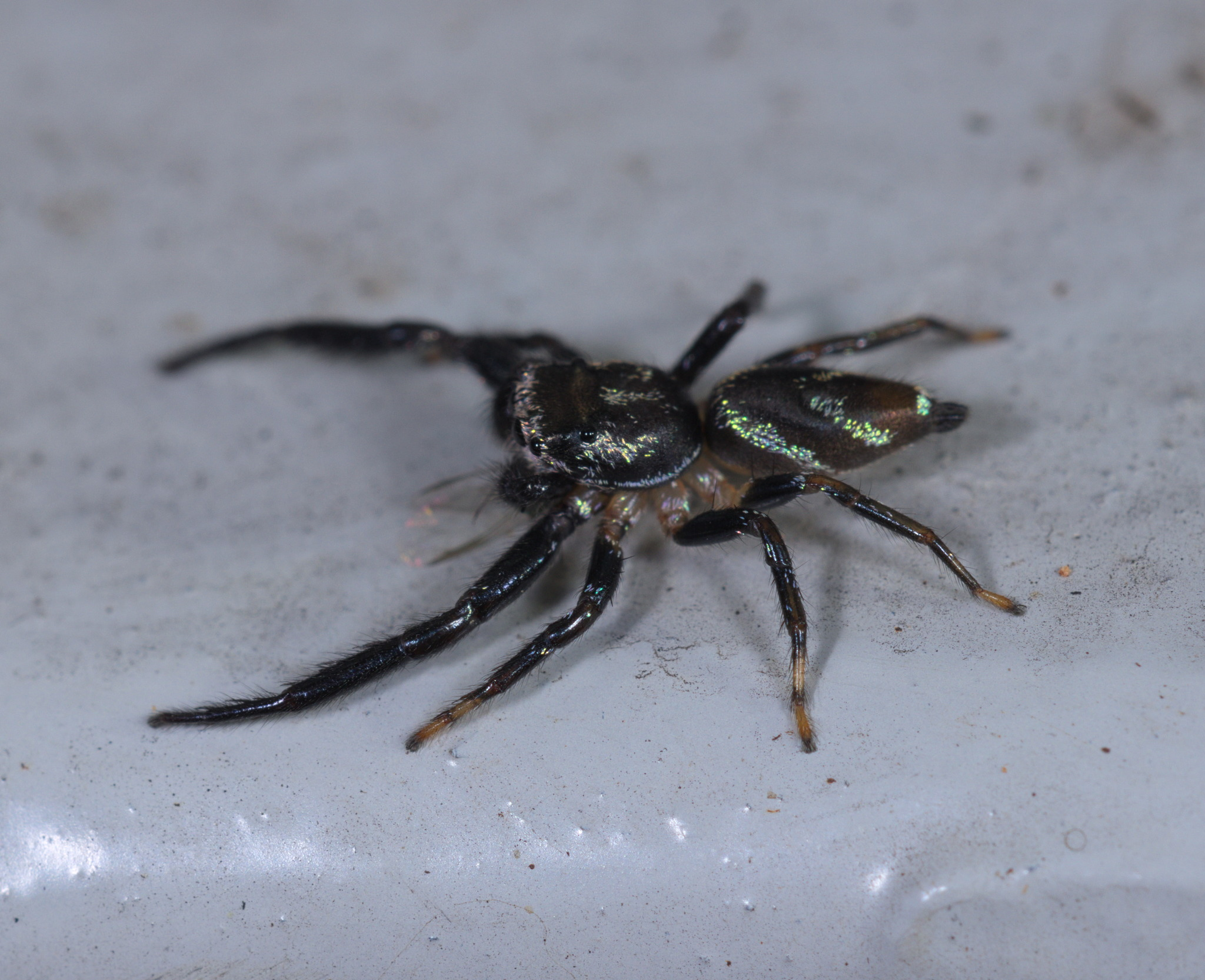
- Male from Hong Kong

Scientific classification
- Kingdom: Animalia
- Phylum: Arthropoda
- Subphylum: Chelicerata
- Class: Arachnida
- Order: Araneae
- Infraorder: Araneomorphae
- Family: Salticidae
- Genus: Thiania
- Species: T. inermis

Binomial name
- Thiania inermis (Karsch, 1897)

Synonyms
- Marptusa inermis Karsch, 1897

= Thiania inermis =

Species of jumping spider

Thiania inermis is a species of jumping spider in the genus Thiania, family Salticidae. It was originally described from specimens collected in Hong Kong.

== Taxonomy ==
The species was first described in 1897 by Ferdinand Karsch as Marptusa inermis based on a single male specimen from Hong Kong. It was later transferred to the genus Thiania by Jerzy Prószyński in 1983 after examination of the type specimen.

The holotype is deposited in the Hungarian Natural History Museum in Budapest, Hungary.

== Distribution ==
T. inermis is known from southern China, specifically from Hong Kong. The species has a limited known distribution, with observations primarily recorded from the Hong Kong region.

== Description ==
Only the male of T. inermis has been formally described. Based on Karsch's original description, the male measures approximately 6 millimeters in length and has a flattened body form typical of the genus Thiania. The cephalothorax and abdomen are black, with the abdomen showing some mottled coloration. The legs are reddish-brown to dark brown with black markings on the coxae and trochanters. The metatarsi and tarsi are pale yellowish, with the metatarsi having black tips. The posterior legs have longer black bristles, and the palps lack spines, which gives the species its name "inermis" (meaning "unarmed").
