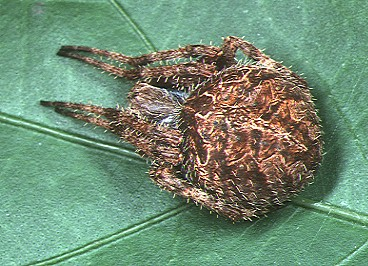
- female from Okinawa
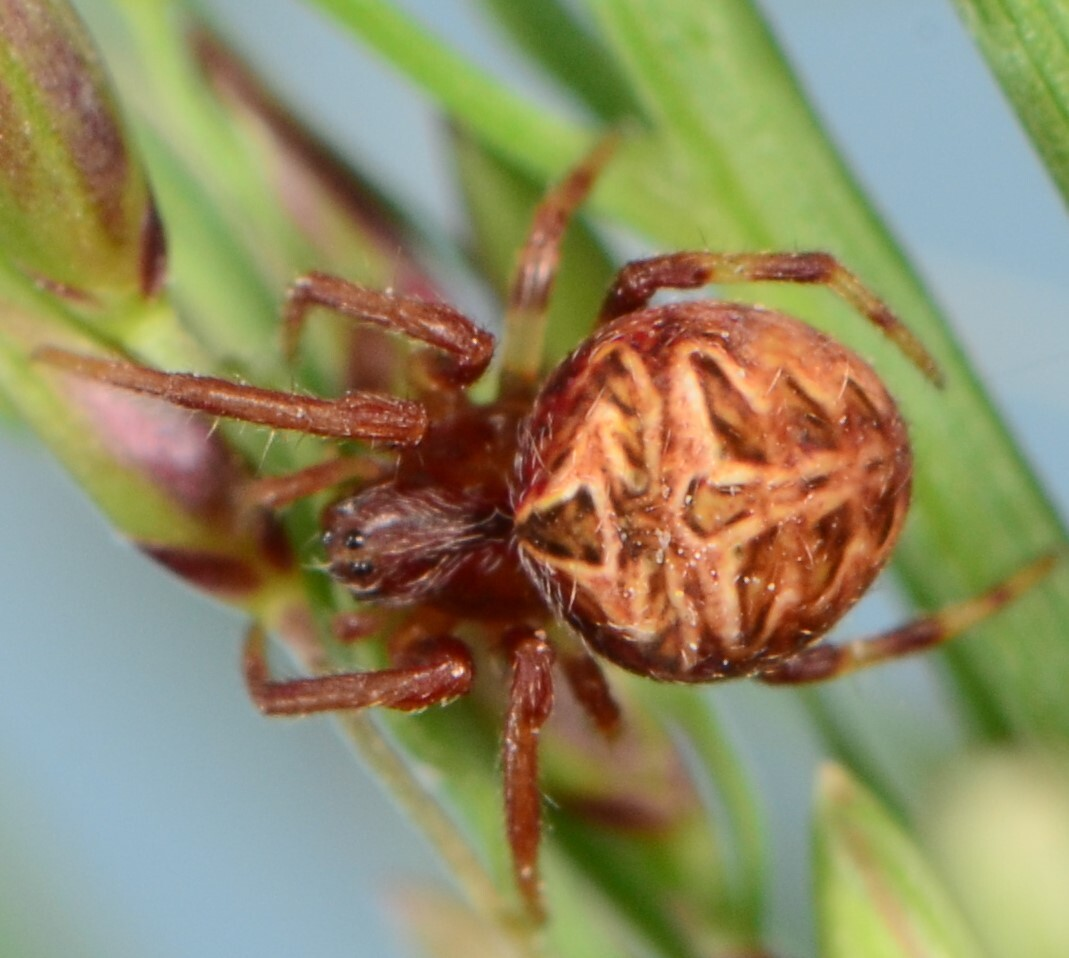
- female from South Africa

Scientific classification
- Kingdom: Animalia
- Phylum: Arthropoda
- Subphylum: Chelicerata
- Class: Arachnida
- Order: Araneae
- Infraorder: Araneomorphae
- Family: Araneidae
- Genus: Neoscona
- Species: N. vigilans

Binomial name
- Neoscona vigilans (Blackwall, 1865)

Synonyms
- Epeira vigilans Blackwall, 1865; Epeira rufofemorata Simon, 1884; Araneus marshalli Pocock, 1898; Araneus spenceri Pocock, 1898; Aranea temeraria Tullgren, 1910; Araneus alternidens Schenkel, 1936; Neoscona irritans Caporiacco, 1947; Neoscona xiquanensis Barrion, Barrion-Dupo & Heong, 2013

= Neoscona vigilans =

Species of orb-weaver spider

Neoscona vigilans is a species of orb-weaver spider in the genus Neoscona. It has a very wide distribution across sub-Saharan Africa, the Arabian Peninsula, and much of Asia from Iran and Pakistan to Japan and New Guinea.

== Taxonomy ==
The species was first described by John Blackwall in 1865 as Epeira vigilans from specimens collected along the Shire River in Malawi. Due to its wide distribution and morphological variation, the species was described multiple times under different names by various authors. The extensive synonymy includes Araneus marshalli and A. spenceri from South Africa, Aranea temeraria from Mount Kilimanjaro, and several Asian forms.

In 1986, Grasshoff conducted a comprehensive revision of African Neoscona species and established the current taxonomy by synonymizing the various names under N. vigilans. Most recently in 2024, Mi, Wang & Li synonymized Neoscona xiquanensis, described from Hainan Island, with N. vigilans.

== Distribution ==
N. vigilans has been recorded across a vast range spanning sub-Saharan Africa, Oman, Iran, Pakistan, India, China, Japan, and New Guinea. In Africa, it occurs from Angola and the Democratic Republic of the Congo in the west to Kenya and Tanzania in the east, and south to South Africa. The species extends through the Arabian Peninsula and across Asia through the Indomalayan region.

== Habitat and ecology ==
Neoscona vigilans builds orb-webs at night in vegetation. The webs are removed early in the morning and the spiders rest on plants during the day. In South Africa, the species has been sampled from the Forest, Indian Ocean Coastal Belt, Grassland, Nama Karoo, and Savanna biomes.

== Description ==
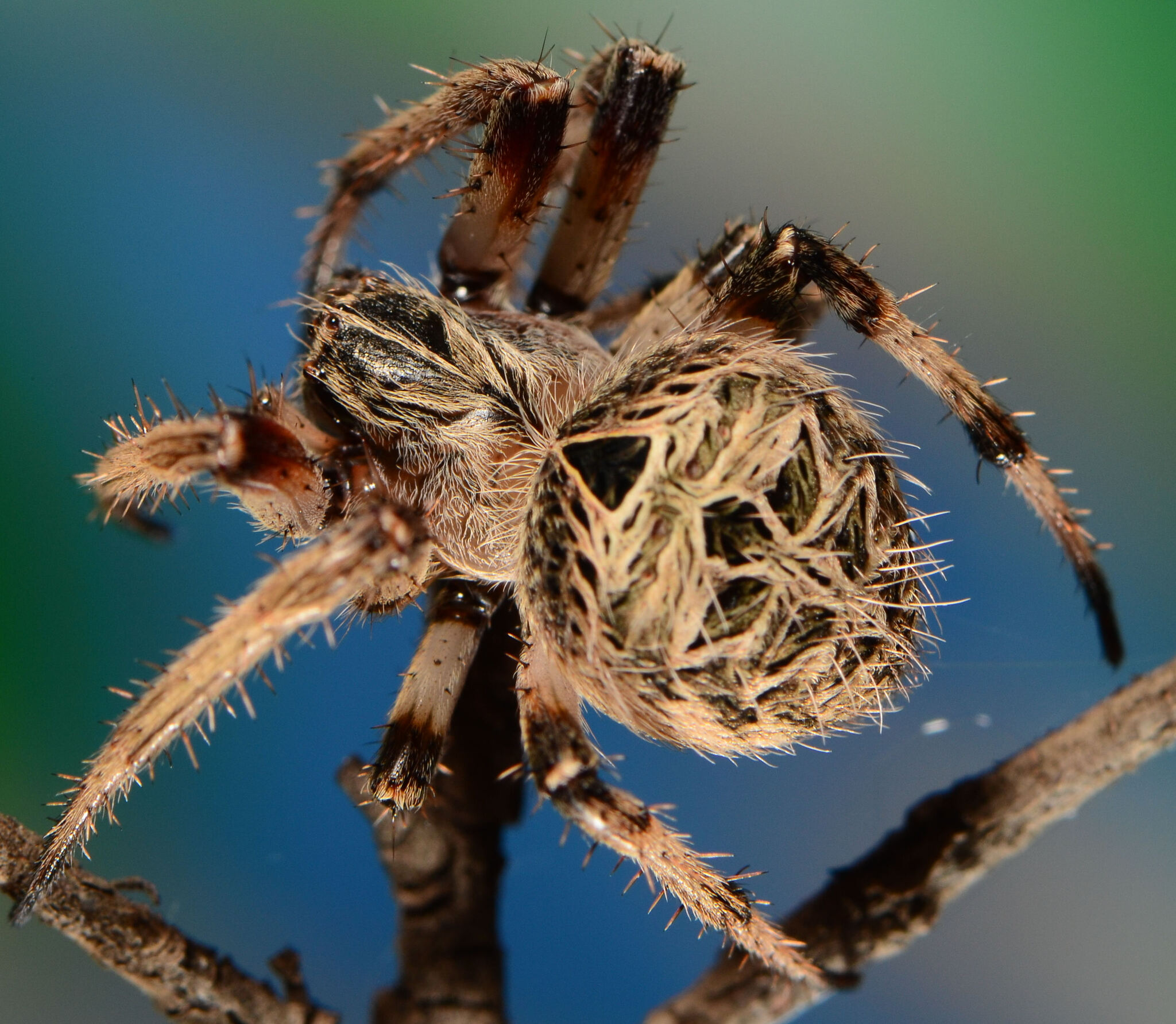
female

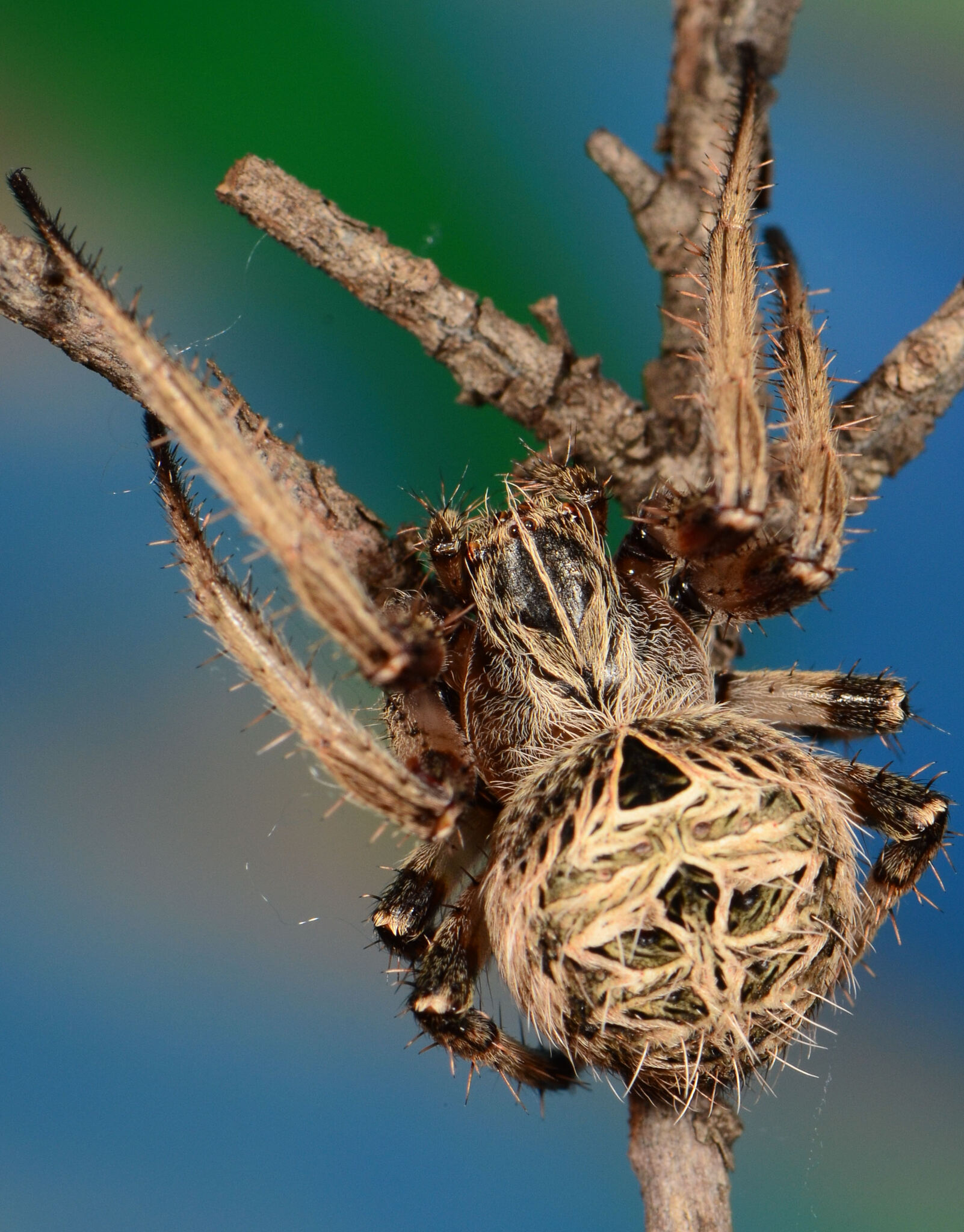
female

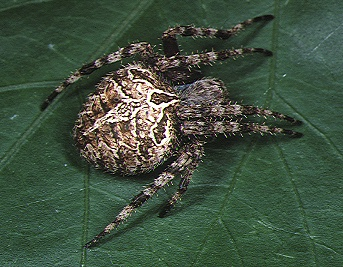
female

Neoscona vigilans exhibits the typical orb-weaver body plan with females considerably larger than males. Females measure 11-16 mm in total length while males are 7-9 mm.

The cephalothorax is yellowish-brown and variably spotted, while the legs show distinct banding patterns. The abdomen displays a characteristic dorsal pattern with a wedge-shaped mark and folium design typical of many Neoscona species.

In females, the epigyne is distinctive with openings directed laterally and covered by pointed ridges that extend far enough laterally to be visible beside the scape when viewed from below. The tibiae of legs I and II bear spines that are diagnostic for the species - those on tibia I are only slightly elongated, while tibia II has thickened, slightly shortened spines distributed evenly from base to tip.

Males can be identified by their pedipalp structure, particularly the flattened tip of the median apophysis (unlike the twisted tips found in related species) and the cone-shaped lateral extension of the conductor. Some geographic variation exists, with African specimens lacking a tegular tubercle that is present in specimens from Nepal.

== Conservation ==
Neoscona vigilans is listed as Least Concern by the South African National Biodiversity Institute due to its wide geographical range. There are no significant threats to the species. The species is protected in four protected areas including Karoo National Park.
