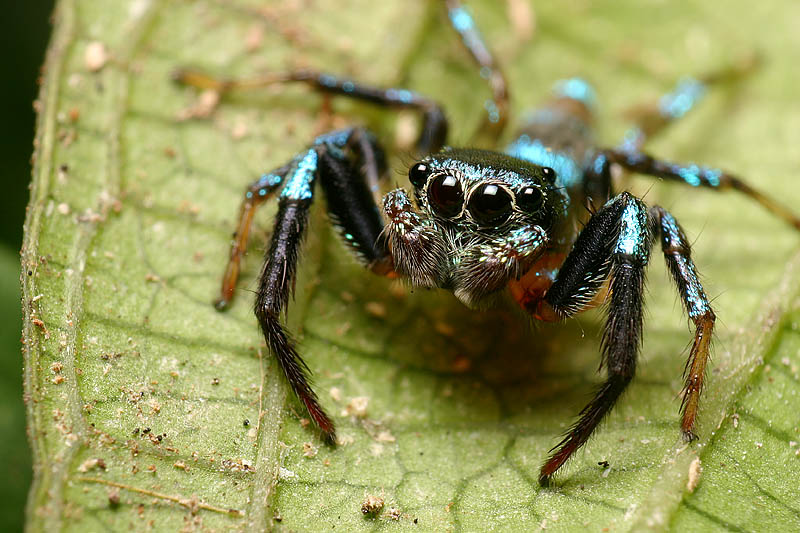
- Thiania bhamoensis

Scientific classification
- Kingdom: Animalia
- Phylum: Arthropoda
- Subphylum: Chelicerata
- Class: Arachnida
- Order: Araneae
- Infraorder: Araneomorphae
- Family: Salticidae
- Subfamily: Salticinae
- Genus: Thiania; C. L. Koch, 1846

Type species
- T. pulcherrima C. L. Koch, 1846

Species
- 23, see text

Synonyms
- Pselcis Simon, 1903

= Thiania =

Genus of spiders

Thiania is a genus of jumping spiders that was first described by Carl Ludwig Koch in 1846.

== Species ==
As of August 2019 it contains twenty-three species, found in Asia from Pakistan to the Philippines, with one species found on Hawaii:

- Thiania abdominalis Zabka, 1985 – China, Vietnam
- Thiania aura Dyal, 1935 – Pakistan
- Thiania bhamoensis Thorell, 1887 – India to Myanmar, Thailand, Laos, Indonesia (Sumatra, Bali)
- Thiania cavaleriei Schenkel, 1963 – China
- Thiania chrysogramma Simon, 1901 – China (Hong Kong)
- Thiania coelestis (Karsch, 1880) – Philippines
- Thiania cupreonitens (Simon, 1899) – Indonesia (Sumatra)
- Thiania demissa (Thorell, 1892) – Indonesia
- Thiania formosissima (Thorell, 1890) – Borneo
- Thiania gazellae (Karsch, 1878) – New Guinea
- Thiania humilis (Thorell, 1877) – Indonesia (Sulawesi)
- Thiania inermis (Karsch, 1897) – China (Hong Kong)
- Thiania jucunda Thorell, 1890 – Indonesia (Sumatra)
- Thiania latefasciata (Simon, 1877) – Philippines
- Thiania latibola Zhang & Maddison, 2012 – Malaysia
- Thiania luteobrachialis Schenkel, 1963 – China
- Thiania pulcherrima C. L. Koch, 1846 (type) – Sri Lanka, Vietnam, Malaysia, Indonesia (Sulawesi)
- Thiania simplicissima (Karsch, 1880) – Philippines
- Thiania sinuata Thorell, 1890 – Malaysia
- Thiania suboppressa Strand, 1907 – China, Vietnam, Japan. Introduced to US (Hawaii)
- Thiania subserena Simon, 1901 – Malaysia
- Thiania tenuis Zhang & Maddison, 2012 – Borneo
- Thiania viscaensis Barrion & Litsinger, 1995 – Philippines

== See also ==
- Thianella
