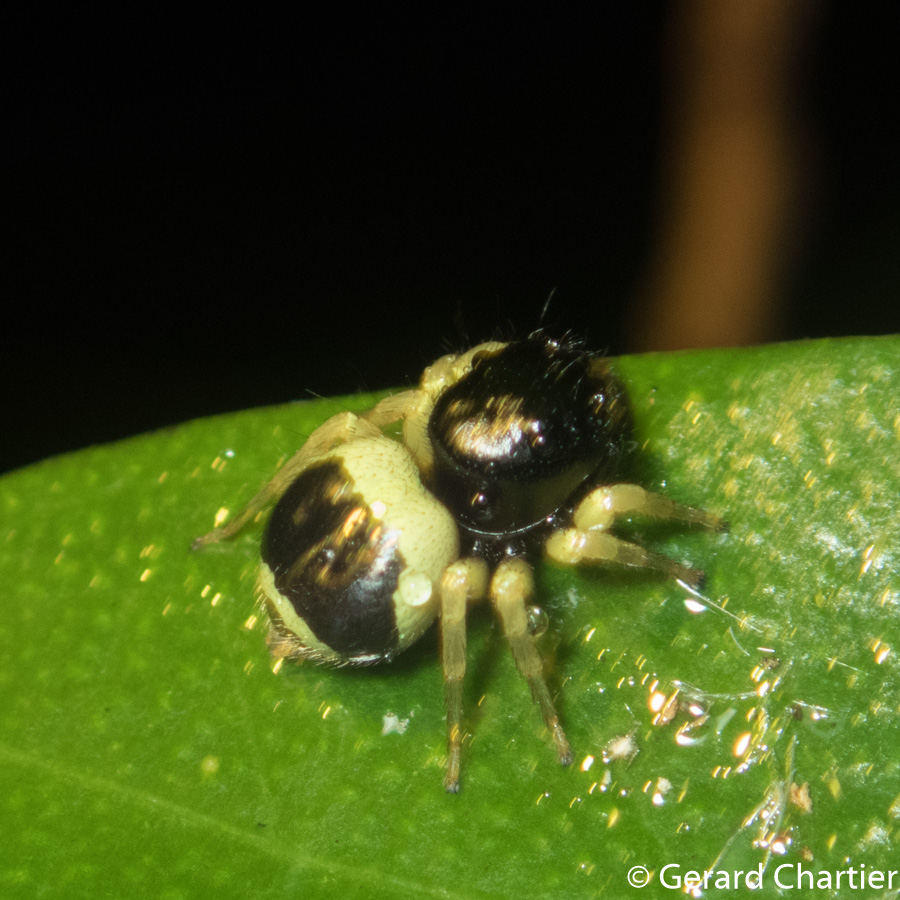
- P. ephippigera from Cambodia

Scientific classification
- Kingdom: Animalia
- Phylum: Arthropoda
- Subphylum: Chelicerata
- Class: Arachnida
- Order: Araneae
- Infraorder: Araneomorphae
- Family: Salticidae
- Genus: Pystira
- Species: P. ephippigera

Binomial name
- Pystira ephippigera (Simon, 1885)

Synonyms
- Hadrosoma ephippigerum Simon, 1885; Bootes ephippiger Thorell, 1892; Omoedus ephippigerus Zhang & Maddison, 2012

= Pystira ephippigera =

Bumblebee Jumper

Species of spider

Pystira ephippigera is a species of jumping spider in the family Salticidae. It is mostly found in Indonesia, specifically on the island of Sumatra.

The specific epithet "ephippigera" is derived from Greek, meaning "saddle-bearing", referring to the distinctive markings on the spider's opisthosoma.

== Taxonomy ==
The species was originally described by Eugène Simon in 1885 as Hadrosoma ephippigerum based on specimens collected from Sumatra by M. Weyers. Tamerlan Thorell transferred it to the genus Bootes as B. ephippiger in 1892. Simon subsequently moved the species to the genus Pystira in 1901, establishing the currently accepted name Pystira ephippigera.

The species has undergone recent taxonomic changes. In 2012 and 2015, Zhang and Maddison transferred it to the genus Omoedus as O. ephippigerus. However, this placement was rejected by Jerzy Prószyński in 2017, who returned the species to Pystira. Pystira ephippigera serves as the type species of the genus Pystira.

== Distribution ==
P. ephippigera was described from Sumatra, Indonesia. The type specimen was collected from the island and is presumed to be deposited at the Muséum National d'Histoire Naturelle in Paris, France, where most of Simon's type material is housed. The species has also been observed in Thailand, Cambodia and peninsular Malaysia.

== Description ==
Based on Simon's original description, the female has a cephalothorax that is thick, convex, and blackish, appearing almost hairless with a shiny, somewhat leathery texture and very sparsely hairy. The opisthosoma is short and depressed, with the front bluntly margined and the back strongly pointed, whitish-opaque in color. In the middle, there is a very broad transverse saddle-shaped marking (which occupies more than half the length of the dorsum), followed by a transverse abbreviated stripe much narrower than the blackish ornament above, and below blackish on both sides with testaceous areas.

The legs and pedipalps, chelicerae, and sternum are black, with all coxae obscurely brownish. The legs are pale yellow, short and robust, with the first and second legs having two terminal spines on the tibiae except the blunt ones, and the first and second metatarsi have 2-2 short spines below.
