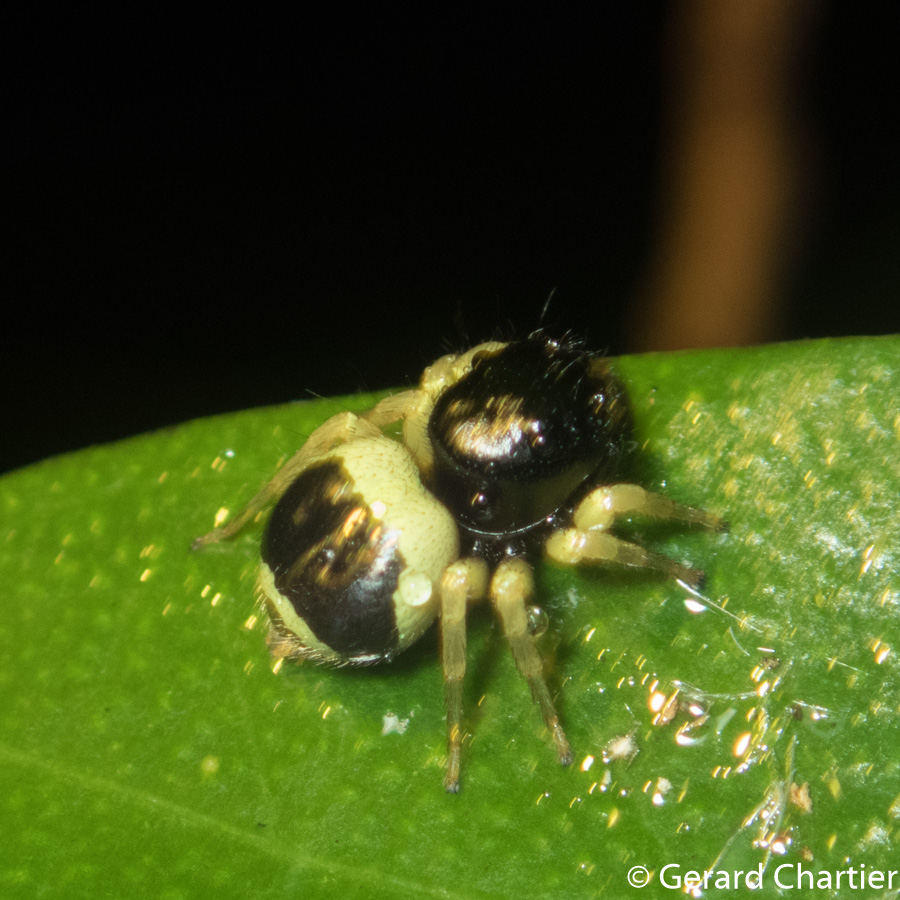
- Pystira ephippigera

Scientific classification
- Kingdom: Animalia
- Phylum: Arthropoda
- Subphylum: Chelicerata
- Class: Arachnida
- Order: Araneae
- Infraorder: Araneomorphae
- Family: Salticidae
- Subfamily: Salticinae
- Tribe: Euophryini
- Genus: Pystira; Simon, 1901

Species
- See text.

= Pystira =

Genus of spiders

Pystira is a genus of spiders in the jumping spider family Salticidae.

== Taxonomy ==
The genus Pystira was erected by Eugène Simon in 1901 with the type species Pystira ephippigera, which he had originally placed in a different genus (Hadrosoma, no longer in use) when he first described it in 1885. In 2015, Junxia Zhang and Wayne Maddison synonymized Pystira with Omoedus, but this was rejected by Jerzy Prószyński in 2017, and the genus is accepted by the World Spider Catalog as of August 2020.

When synonymized with Omoedus, the genus was placed in the tribe Euophryini in Maddison's 2015 classification of the family Salticidae. Prószyński placed the separated genus in his informal group euophryines.

=== Species ===
As of September 2025, the World Spider Catalog accepted the following extant species:

- Pystira cyanothorax (Thorell, 1881) – New Guinea
- Pystira ephippigera (Simon, 1885) (type species) – Sumatra
- Pystira karschi (Thorell, 1881) – New Guinea, Aru Islands
- Pystira nigripalpis (Thorell, 1877) – Sulawesi
- Pystira versicolor Dyal, 1935 – Pakistan
