= Lophostica =

Scientific classification
- Kingdom: Animalia
- Phylum: Arthropoda
- Subphylum: Chelicerata
- Class: Arachnida
- Order: Araneae
- Infraorder: Araneomorphae
- Family: Salticidae
- Subfamily: Salticinae
- Genus: Lophostica; Simon, 1902

Type species
- Lophostica mauriciana Simon, 1902

Species
- See text.

Diversity
- 3 species

Genus of spiders

Lophostica is a genus of spiders in the family Salticidae (jumping spiders). Its three described species occur only on Mauritius and Réunion.

== Species ==
As of March 2017, the World Spider Catalog accepted the following species:

- Lophostica mauriciana Simon, 1902 – Mauritius, Réunion
- Lophostica minor Ledoux, 2007 – Réunion
- Lophostica nova Ledoux, 2007 – Réunion
