= Lophostica mauriciana =

Scientific classification
- Kingdom: Animalia
- Phylum: Arthropoda
- Subphylum: Chelicerata
- Class: Arachnida
- Order: Araneae
- Infraorder: Araneomorphae
- Family: Salticidae
- Genus: Lophostica
- Species: L. mauriciana

Binomial name
- Lophostica mauriciana Simon, 1902

Species of spider

Lophostica mauriciana is a species of spider in the family Salticidae. It is found only in the islands of Mauritius and Réunion in the western Indian Ocean.

== Description ==
Lophostica mauriciana has a body length up to around 5 mm, made up of a cephalothorax of 2.2–2.8 mm and an abdomen of 2.2–3.0 mm. Males typically have a slightly longer cephalothorax and a slightly shorter and narrower abdomen. The area containing the eyes makes up about half of the cephalothorax. The carapace is dark or reddish brown, very dark in males. The abdomen is greyish-brown on the upper side with a lighter central mark and chevron patterns; the pattern is more distinct in males. Females have generally yellow to light brown legs, with the fourth pair being longest. Males have more brown on their legs, and the first pair is the longest.

== Taxonomy ==
Lophostica mauriciana was first described by Eugène Simon in 1902, as the only species in his new genus, Lophostica. Little was known of the species until 2000, when Wanda Wesołowska published a re-description, based on what she thought were specimens originally described by Simon. However, it was later discovered that the labels had been exchanged between the tubes in which specimen of this species and of Pseudemathis trifida were kept, and a corrected description was published in 2005. Two new species of Lophostica from Réunion were described in 2007, so this is no longer the only species in the genus.

== Distribution and habitat ==
Lophostica mauriciana is found only on Mauritius and Réunion. On Réunion, it was found in rain forest, usually on the ground but sometimes on tree bark.
