= List of Salticidae genera =

As of January 2026, this family includes 695 genera and 6,950 species.

Complete list of Salticidae genera as of January 2026
- Abracadabrella Żabka, 1991 – Australia
- Acragas Simon, 1900 – Guatemala, Panama, South America
- Admestina G. W. Peckham & E. G. Peckham, 1888 – North America
- Admesturius Galiano, 1988 – Argentina, Chile
- Adoxotoma Simon, 1909 – Australia, New Zealand
- Aelurillus Simon, 1885 – Africa, Asia, Europe, Mediterranean to Turkmenistan, North Africa, South-eastern Europe
- Afraflacilla Berland & Millot, 1941 – Africa, Asia, Greece, Portugal, Spain, Australia, Marshall Islands, Cook Islands, Samoa, North Africa, Borneo, Central
- Afrobeata Caporiacco, 1941 – Ethiopia, Tanzania, Yemen
- Afromarengo Benjamin, 2004 – Africa
- Agobardus Keyserling, 1885 – Cuba, Hispaniola, Puerto Rico
- Agorioides Maddison & Szűts, 2019 – Papua New Guinea
- Agorius Thorell, 1877 – China, Southeast Asia, New Guinea, Papua New Guinea, Borneo
- Ahijuna Rubio, Baigorria & Stolar, 2022 – Argentina
- Aillutticus Galiano, 1987 – Argentina, Brazil, Paraguay
- Ajaraneola Wesołowska & Russell-Smith, 2011 – Uganda, Nigeria
- Akela G. W. Peckham & E. G. Peckham, 1896 – Pakistan, Guatemala, Panama, Argentina, Brazil, Uruguay
- Albionella Chickering, 1946 – Panama
- Alcmena C. L. Koch, 1846 – Mexico, Argentina, Brazil, Venezuela
- Alfenus Simon, 1902 – Cameroon, Democratic Republic of the Congo, Equatorial Guinea, Uganda
- Allococalodes Wanless, 1982 – Indonesia, Papua New Guinea
- Allodecta Bryant, 1950 – Jamaica
- Amatorculus Ruiz & Brescovit, 2005 – Brazil, French Guiana
- Amilaps Maddison, 2019 – Guatemala, Mexico
- Amoenema Yu & Zhang, 2023 – China
- Amphidraus Simon, 1900 – South America
- Amycus C. L. Koch, 1846 – Mexico, South America
- Ananeon Richardson, 2013 – Australia
- Anarrhotus Simon, 1902 – China, Malaysia, Singapore, Vietnam, India
- Anasaitis Bryant, 1950 – North America, Colombia, Presumably Caribbean. Introduced to Britain
- Anaurus Simon, 1900 – Brazil
- Ancepitilobus Richardson, 2016 – Australia
- Anicius Chamberlin, 1925 – Mexico
- Ansienulina Wesołowska, 2015 – Angola, Kenya, Namibia, Guinea, Ivory Coast
- Antillattus Bryant, 1943 – Cuba, Dominican Rep, Hispaniola
- Aphirape C. L. Koch, 1850 – South America
- Apricia Richardson, 2016 – Australia, Tasmania
- Arachnomura Mello-Leitão, 1917 – Argentina, Brazil
- Arachnotermes Mello-Leitão, 1928 – Brazil
- Araegeus Simon, 1901 – Mozambique, South Africa
- Araneotanna Özdikmen & Kury, 2006 – Vanuatu
- Arasia Simon, 1901 – Australia, New Guinea
- Arnoliseus Braul, 2002 – Brazil
- Artabrus Simon, 1902 – Indonesia, Singapore
- Aruana Strand, 1911 – Indonesia, Papua New Guinea
- Aruattus Logunov & Azarkina, 2008 – Indonesia
- Asaphobelis Simon, 1902 – Brazil
- Asaracus C. L. Koch, 1846 – Brazil, Guyana, Venezuela
- Ascyltus Karsch, 1878 – Indonesia, Australia, Fiji, Samoa, Tonga, Tuvalu, Pacific Islands
- Asemonea O. Pickard-Cambridge, 1869 – Africa, Asia, West. Introduced to Australia
- Ashtabula G. W. Peckham & E. G. Peckham, 1894 – Panama, Mexico, South America
- Asianellus Logunov & Hęciak, 1996 – Kazakhstan, China, Japan, Korea, Caucasus, Russia
- Astia L. Koch, 1879 – Australia
- Astilodes Żabka, 2009 – Australia
- Atelurius Simon, 1901 – Bolivia, Brazil, Venezuela
- Athamas O. Pickard-Cambridge, 1877 – New Guinea, Papua New Guinea, Vanuatu, French Polynesia, Palau Is, Tahiti
- Atomosphyrus Simon, 1902 – Argentina, Brazil, Chile
- Attidops Banks, 1905 – North America
- Attinella Banks, 1905 – North America
- Attulus Simon, 1889 – Asia, Europe, North America, Central Europe to Greece, Indroduced to Canada. Introduced to North America
- Augustaea Szombathy, 1915 – Singapore
- Australoneon Richardson, 2025 – Australia
- Avaruarachne Sherwood, 2021 – Cook Islands
- Avitus G. W. Peckham & E. G. Peckham, 1896 – Jamaica, Panama, Argentina, Brazil, Paraguay
- Bacelarella Berland & Millot, 1941 – Africa, West Africa
- Bagheera G. W. Peckham & E. G. Peckham, 1896 – Costa Rica, Guatemala, Mexico, United States
- Ballagascar Azarkina & Haddad, 2020 – Madagascar
- Ballus C. L. Koch, 1850 – Egypt, Japan, Myanmar, Sri Lanka, Armenia, Turkey, Cyprus, Italy, Malta, France, North Africa, North Africa to Central Asia
- Balmaceda G. W. Peckham & E. G. Peckham, 1894 – El Salvador, Guatemala, Panama, Mexico, South America
- Banksetosa Chickering, 1946 – Panama
- Barraina Richardson, 2013 – Australia
- Baryphas Simon, 1902 – Africa, Zimbawe
- Bathippus Thorell, 1892 – Indonesia, Malaysia, India, Australia, Melanesia, Borneo
- Bavia Simon, 1877 – Madagascar, China, Japan, Southeast Asia, Australia, New Guinea, Kiribati, Caroline Is. Introduced to Pacific Islands
- Baviola Simon, 1898 – Seychelles
- Beata G. W. Peckham & E. G. Peckham, 1895 – North America, South America, St, Thomas
- Belippo Simon, 1909 – Africa
- Belliena Simon, 1902 – Trinidad, Ecuador, Venezuela
- Bellota G. W. Peckham & E. G. Peckham, 1892 – Pakistan, Panama, United States, South America
- Bianor G. W. Peckham & E. G. Peckham, 1886 – Africa, Asia, Azores, Canary Islands, Australia, Fiji, Kiribati, New Zealand, Brazil, Mediterranean to Russia
- Bindax Thorell, 1892 – Indonesia, Vietnam, Solomon Islands
- Bocus G. W. Peckham & E. G. Peckham, 1892 – Philippines, Borneo
- Bocusoides Wang & Li, 2022 – China
- Bokokius Roewer, 1942 – Equatorial Guinea
- Breda G. W. Peckham & E. G. Peckham, 1894 – Trinidad, Panama, Mexico, South America
- Brettus Thorell, 1895 – Madagascar, Asia
- Bristowia Reimoser, 1934 – DR Congo, Kenya, Uganda, Guinea, Asia, Rep
- Bryantella Chickering, 1946 – Panama to Argentina, Panama to Brazil
- Bulolia Żabka, 1996 – New Guinea
- Burmattus Prószyński, 1992 – Asia
- Bythocrotus Simon, 1903 – Hispaniola
- Calxattus Wang, Yu & Zhang, 2023 – China
- Canama Simon, 1903 – Indonesia, Malaysia, Australia, New Guinea, Papua New Guinea
- Capeta Ruiz & Brescovit, 2005 – Brazil
- Capeyorkia Richardson, 2016 – Australia, Papua New Guinea
- Capidava Simon, 1902 – Brazil, Guyana
- Carabella Chickering, 1946 – Panama
- Caribattus Bryant, 1950 – Jamaica
- Carrhotus Thorell, 1891 – Africa, Asia, Russia, Brazil
- Cavillator Wesołowska, 2000 – Zimbabwe
- Ceglusa Thorell, 1895 – Myanmar
- Cembalea Wesołowska, 1993 – Kenya, Mozambique, Tanzania, Namibia, South Africa, Guinea
- Ceriomura Simon, 1901 – South America
- Cerionesta Simon, 1901 – St. Vincent, Galapagos
- Chalcolecta Simon, 1884 – Indonesia, Australia, New Guinea
- Chalcolemia Zhang & Maddison, 2012 – Papua New Guinea
- Chalcoscirtus Bertkau, 1880 – Egypt, Asia, Europe, North America, south-eastern Europe, Central
- Chalcotropis Simon, 1902 – Indonesia, Philippines, India, Tonga
- Chalcovietnamicus Marusik, 1991 – China, Southeast Asia
- Chapoda G. W. Peckham & E. G. Peckham, 1896 – Central America, Brazil, Colombia, Ecuador
- Charippus Thorell, 1895 – China, Malaysia, Myanmar, Singapore
- Cheliceroides Żabka, 1985 – China, Vietnam
- Cheliferoides F. O. Pickard-Cambridge, 1901 – Panama, United States
- Chinattus Logunov, 1999 – Asia, North America
- Chinophrys Zhang & Maddison, 2012 – South Africa, China, Taiwan, Vietnam
- Chinoscopus Simon, 1901 – Trinidad, Panama, South America
- Chira G. W. Peckham & E. G. Peckham, 1896 – Trinidad, Guatemala, Honduras, Panama, South America
- Chirothecia Taczanowski, 1878 – Panama, South America
- Chuanattus C. Wang, Mi & Li, 2025 – China
- Chrysilla Thorell, 1887 – Guinea, Asia, Australia, East Africa
- Clynotis Simon, 1901 – Australia, New Zealand
- Clynotoides Mello-Leitão, 1944 – Argentina
- Cobanus F. O. Pickard-Cambridge, 1900 – Costa Rica, Panama, Colombia
- Cocalodes Pocock, 1897 – Indonesia, New Guinea, Papua New Guinea
- Cocalus C. L. Koch, 1846 – China, Indonesia, India, Australia, New Guinea
- Coccorchestes Thorell, 1881 – Indonesia, Australia, New Guinea, Papua New Guinea
- Colaxes Simon, 1900 – China, India, Sri Lanka
- Colonus F. O. Pickard-Cambridge, 1901 – Trinidad and Tobago, El Salvador, Nicaragua, Panama, Mexico, United States, South America
- Colopsus Simon, 1902 – India, Sri Lanka
- Colyttus Thorell, 1891 – China, Indonesia, Malaysia, Vietnam, India, Borneo
- Commoris Simon, 1902 – Dominica, Guadeloupe
- Compsodecta Simon, 1903 – Hispaniola, Jamaica
- Copocrossa Simon, 1901 – Indonesia, Malaysia, Singapore, Australia
- Corambis Simon, 1901 – New Caledonia
- Corcovetella Galiano, 1975 – Costa Rica, Brazil, French Guiana
- Corticattus Zhang & Maddison, 2012 – Hispaniola, Puerto Rico
- Corusca Zhou & Li, 2013 – China
- Coryphasia Simon, 1902 – Jamaica, Puerto Rico, Argentina, Brazil, French Guiana
- Corythalia C. L. Koch, 1850 – North America, South America, presumably Neotropics/South America, St. Vincent and the Grenadines
- Cosmophasis Simon, 1901 – Equatorial Guinea, Gabon, Ethiopia, Libya, Guinea, Asia, Australia, Melanesia, East Africa, Caroline Is, Palau Is, Timor. Introduced to Seychelles, Hawaii, Fiji, French Polynesia
- Cotinusa Simon, 1900 – Pakistan, Panama, South America
- Cucudeta Maddison, 2009 – Papua New Guinea
- Curubis Simon, 1902 – India, Sri Lanka
- Cylistella Simon, 1901 – Costa Rica, Panama, Mexico, Argentina? Brazil
- Cyllodania Simon, 1902 – Trinidad, Costa Rica, Panama, Brazil, Ecuador, Venezuela
- Cynapes Simon, 1900 – Mauritius, Réunion, Seychelles
- Cyrba Simon, 1876 – Africa, China, Indonesia, Canary Is. to Central Asia, Caucasus to Central Asia, Eastern Africa to India. Introduced to Australia
- Cytaea Keyserling, 1882 – Asia, Oceania, Caroline Is
- Damoetas G. W. Peckham & E. G. Peckham, 1886 – Australia
- Darwinneon Cutler, 1971 – Galapagos
- Dasycyptus Simon, 1902 – Democratic Republic of the Congo, Gabon, Uganda, Ivory Coast
- Dendroicius Lin & Li, 2020 – China, Indonesia
- Dendryphantes C. L. Koch, 1837 – Africa, Asia, Poland, Belarus, Russia, Spain, North America, South America
- Depreissia Lessert, 1942 – Democratic Republic of the Congo, Uganda, Borneo
- Descanso G. W. Peckham & E. G. Peckham, 1892 – Panama, Brazil, Colombia, Peru
- Detalik Wesołowska, 2021 – Western Africa
- Dexippus Thorell, 1891 – China, Taiwan, Indonesia, India
- Dianattus C. Wang, Mi & Li, 2025 – China
- Diolenius Thorell, 1870 – Indonesia, New Guinea, Papua New Guinea
- Diplocanthopoda Abraham, 1925 – China, Malaysia, Singapore
- Dolichoneon Caporiacco, 1935 – Pakistan
- Donaldius Chickering, 1946 – Panama
- Drizztius Edwards, 2015 – Trinidad, Peru
- Drobinka Wesołowska, 2021 – Nigeria
- Druzia Ruiz & Brescovit, 2013 – Brazil
- Eburneana Wesołowska & Szűts, 2001 – Cameroon, Tanzania, Ivory Coast
- Echeclus Thorell, 1890 – Malaysia
- Echinussa Simon, 1901 – Madagascar
- Ecuadattus Zhang & Maddison, 2012 – Ecuador
- Edilemma Ruiz & Brescovit, 2006 – Brazil
- Edwardsya Ruiz & Bustamante, 2016 – Brazil
- Efate Berland, 1938 – Fiji, Vanuatu, Guam, Marshall Islands, Samoa, Caroline Is
- Emathis Simon, 1899 – Southeast Asia
- Emertonius G. W. Peckham & E. G. Peckham, 1892 – Indonesia, Malaysia, Philippines
- Empanda Simon, 1903 – Guatemala
- Encolpius Simon, 1900 – Bolivia, Brazil, Venezuela, Argentinia
- Encymachus Simon, 1902 – Namibia
- Enoplomischus Giltay, 1931 – Democratic Republic of the Congo, Kenya, Uganda, Ivory Coast
- Epeus G. W. Peckham & E. G. Peckham, 1886 – Asia
- Epidelaxia Simon, 1902 – India, Sri Lanka
- Epocilla Thorell, 1887 – Mauritius, Asia. Introduced to Seychelles, Hawaii
- Erasinus Simon, 1899 – Indonesia, Malaysia
- Eremitarys Wang, Yu & Zhang, 2024 – China
- Ergane L. Koch, 1881 – Malaysia, Philippines, Australia, Caroline Is
- Erica G. W. Peckham & E. G. Peckham, 1892 – Panama, South America
- Eris C. L. Koch, 1846 – Puerto Rico, Panama, North America, Colombia, Ecuador
- Euochin Prószyński, 2018 – China, Japan, Taiwan, Philippines, Vietnam
- Euophrys C. L. Koch, 1834 – Africa, Asia, Canary Islands, Russia, Italy, Portugal, Spain, France, St. Vincent, Guatemala, North America, New Zealand, South America, East Africa, Western Mediterranean, Central, Western
- Eupoa Żabka, 1985 – China, Southeast Asia, India
- Euryattus Thorell, 1881 – Indonesia, Sri Lanka, Australia, New Guinea, Papua New Guinea, Borneo
- Eustiromastix Simon, 1902 – St. Vincent, Trinidad, Trinidad and Tobago, Panama, South America
- Evarcha Simon, 1902 – Africa, Asia, Canary Islands, Russia, Cyprus, Greece, North America, Australia, New Guinea, East Africa, North Africa, Caroline Is, Central. Introduced to Germany, Belgium
- Featheroides Peng, Yin, Xie & Kim, 1994 – China
- Festucula Simon, 1901 – Africa, Israel
- Finger (spider) Wesołowska & Wiśniewski, 2023 – Angola, Uganda, Guinea
- Flacillula Strand, 1932 – Indonesia, Vietnam, Sri Lanka
- Fluda G. W. Peckham & E. G. Peckham, 1892 – Panama, South America
- Flurica Perger & Rubio, 2022 – Bolivia
- Foliabitus Zhang & Maddison, 2012 – China, Vietnam, India
- Foordus Azarkina, 2024 – South Africa
- Frespera Braul & Lise, 2002 – Venezuela
- Frewena Richardson, 2013 – Australia
- Freya C. L. Koch, 1850 – Guatemala, Panama, Mexico, South America, Northern South America
- Frigga C. L. Koch, 1850 – Guatemala, South America. Introduced to Australia, Pacific Islands, Britain
- Fritzia O. Pickard-Cambridge, 1879 – Argentina, Brazil
- Fuentes G. W. Peckham & E. G. Peckham, 1894 – Honduras, Mexico
- Furculattus Balogh, 1980 – New Guinea
- Galianora Maddison, 2006 – Colombia, Ecuador
- Gambaquezonia Barrion & Litsinger, 1995 – Philippines
- Gastromicans Mello-Leitão, 1917 – Guatemala, Honduras, Panama, South America
- Gavarilla Ruiz & Brescovit, 2006 – Brazil
- Gedea Simon, 1902 – China, Japan, Indonesia, Vietnam
- Gelotia Thorell, 1890 – Asia, Australia, Papua New Guinea
- Ghatippus Marathe & Maddison, 2024 – India
- Ghelna Maddison, 1996 – North America
- Ghumattus Prószyński, 1992 – India
- Goleba Wanless, 1980 – Africa, Rep
- Goleta G. W. Peckham & E. G. Peckham, 1894 – Madagascar
- Gorgasella Chickering, 1946 – Panama
- Gramenca Rollard & Wesołowska, 2002 – Guinea
- Gratianna Caleb, 2025 – China, India, Nepal
- Grayenulla Żabka, 1992 – Australia
- Guriurius Marta, Bustamante, Ruiz & Rodrigues, 2022 – Argentina, Brazil, Uruguay
- Gypogyna Simon, 1900 – Mexico, South America
- Habrocestoides Prószyński, 1992 – India, Nepal
- Habrocestum Simon, 1876 – Africa, Asia, Greece, Italy, Spain, France, Australia, Solomon Islands, East Africa
- Habronattus F. O. Pickard-Cambridge, 1901 – North America, Galapagos, Paraguay. Introduced to Hawaii
- Hakka Berry & Prószyński, 2001 – China, Japan, Korea. Introduced to Hawaii, United States
- Haplopsecas Caporiacco, 1955 – Venezuela
- Harmochirus Simon, 1886 – Madagascar, Ivory Coast, Senegal, Asia, East Africa, Sub-Saharan Africa, Central, Zanzibar
- Hasarina Schenkel, 1963 – China
- Hasarinella Wesołowska, 2012 – Kenya, Tanzania, South Africa
- Hasarius Simon, 1871 – Angola, Cameroon, Comoros, Ethiopia, Seychelles, Asia, Dominican Rep, Guatemala, Australia, New Guinea, Brazil. Introduced to St. Helena, China, Japan, Taiwan, Laos, Vietnam, India, Australia, Pacific Islands, both Americas
- Havaika Prószyński, 2002 – Hawaii
- Helafricanus Wesołowska, 1986 – Africa, Saudi Arabia, Yemen, Mediterranean to Iran
- Helicius Żabka, 1981 – Japan, Korea, Bhutan, Russia
- Heliocapensis Wesołowska, 1986 – Africa
- Heliophanillus Prószyński, 1989 – Afghanistan, United Arab Emirates, Yemen, Greece to Central Asia, North Africa
- Heliophanoides Prószyński, 1992 – China, Bhutan, India
- Heliophanus C. L. Koch, 1833 – Africa, Asia, Europe, Egypt to Central Asia, Europe to Kazakhstan, Mediterranean to Iran, North Africa, Southern Europe to Central Asia. Introduced to North America, Brazil
- Helpis Simon, 1901 – Australia, Papua New Guinea. Introduced to New Zealand, Britain
- Helvetia G. W. Peckham & E. G. Peckham, 1894 – Curaçao, South America. Introduced to Galapagos
- Hentzia Marx, 1883 – North America, Colombia, Guyana, Lesser Antilles. Introduced to Ascension Island
- Heratemita Strand, 1932 – Indonesia, Philippines
- Hermosa G. W. Peckham & E. G. Peckham, 1892 – Angola, Congo, Madagascar, Uganda, China, Indonesia, Malaysia, Vietnam
- Hermotimus Simon, 1903 – Cameroon, Gabon, Uganda
- Hindumanes Logunov, 2004 – India
- Hinewaia Żabka & Pollard, 2002 – New Zealand
- Hispo Simon, 1886 – Africa
- Hisukattus Galiano, 1987 – Argentina, Brazil, Paraguay
- Hivanua Maddison, 2024 – French Polynesia
- Holcolaetis Simon, 1886 – Africa, Yemen, Sao Tome, West
- Holoplatys Simon, 1885 – China, Indonesia, Thailand, Australia, Australian Capital Territory, Eastern Australia, New Caledonia, New Guinea, New Zealand, Caroline Is
- Homalattus White, 1841 – South Africa, Sierra Leone
- Huntiglennia Żabka & Gray, 2004 – Australia
- Hurius Simon, 1901 – South America
- Hyetussa Simon, 1902 – Panama, United States, South America
- Hyllus C. L. Koch, 1846 – Africa, Asia, Borneo, south-east equatorial Africa
- Hypaeus Simon, 1900 – South America
- Iberattus Prószyński, 2018 – Portugal, Spain, France
- Icius Simon, 1876 – Africa, Asia, Europe, Hispaniola, Mexico, Uruguay, East Africa, North Africa, Atlantic Is. Introduced to United States, Western
- Idastrandia Strand, 1929 – Malaysia, Singapore
- Ilargus Simon, 1901 – South America
- Imperceptus Prószyński, 1992 – India
- Indomarengo Benjamin, 2004 – Indonesia, Malaysia, India
- Indopadilla Caleb & Sankaran, 2019 – China, Southeast Asia, India, Caroline Is
- Iona G. W. Peckham & E. G. Peckham, 1886 – Polynesia, Caroline Is
- Iranattus Prószyński, 1992 – Cameroon, South Africa, Zimbabwe, Ivory Coast, Nigeria, India, Iran
- Irura G. W. Peckham & E. G. Peckham, 1901 – Asia
- Itata G. W. Peckham & E. G. Peckham, 1894 – Panama, South America
- Jacksonoides Wanless, 1988 – Australia
- Jajpurattus Prószyński, 1992 – India
- Jaluiticola Roewer, 1944 – Marshall Islands
- Jerzego Maddison, 2014 – China, Indonesia, India, Sri Lanka, Borneo
- Jollas Simon, 1901 – Caribbean, Panama, South America
- Jotus L. Koch, 1881 – Indonesia, Australia, New Zealand
- Judalana Rix, 1999 – Australia
- Kakameganula Wesołowska, 2020 – Kenya, Mozambique, Uganda
- Kalcerrytus Galiano, 2000 – South America
- Katya Prószyński & Deeleman-Reinhold, 2010 – Indonesia
- Kelawakaju Maddison & Ruiz, 2022 – China, Japan, Malaysia, Singapore, India
- Kibo Wesołowska & Szűts, 2021 – Tanzania
- Kima G. W. Peckham & E. G. Peckham, 1902 – Congo, Kenya, Tanzania, Botswana, Namibia, South Africa
- Kupiuka Ruiz, 2010 – Brazil
- Lagnus L. Koch, 1879 – Philippines, Fiji
- Lakarobius Berry, Beatty & Prószyński, 1998 – Fiji
- Lamottella Rollard & Wesołowska, 2002 – Ghana, Guinea
- Langelurillus Próchniewicz, 1994 – Africa, India
- Langerra Żabka, 1985 – China, Vietnam
- Langona Simon, 1901 – Africa, Asia
- Lapsamita Ruiz, 2013 – Brazil
- Lapsias Simon, 1900 – Colombia, Ecuador, Venezuela
- Laufeia Simon, 1889 – China, Japan, Korea, Malaysia, Vietnam, New Zealand
- Lauharulla Keyserling, 1883 – Australia, Tahiti
- Lechia Żabka, 1985 – China, Vietnam
- Leikung Benjamin, 2004 – Indonesia, Malaysia
- Lepidemathis Simon, 1903 – Philippines
- Leptathamas Balogh, 1980 – New Guinea
- Leptofreya Edwards, 2015 – Guatemala, Panama, Mexico, South America, Trinidad & Tobago. Introduced to United States
- Leptorchestes Thorell, 1870 – Algeria, Namibia, Israel, Lebanon, Turkey, Bulgaria, Greece, Europe to Turkmenistan
- Letoia Simon, 1900 – Venezuela
- Leuserattus Prószyński & Deeleman-Reinhold, 2012 – Indonesia, Malaysia
- Leviea Maddison & Szűts, 2019 – Papua New Guinea
- Lictor Wesołowska & Wiśniewski, 2023 – Democratic Republic of the Congo, Gabon, Guinea, Ivory Coast, Nigeria
- Ligdus Thorell, 1895 – China, Myanmar, India
- Ligonipes Karsch, 1878 – Indonesia, Australia, New Guinea
- Ligurra Simon, 1903 – Indonesia, Singapore
- Logunattus Wang & Li, 2023 – China
- Lokina Yu, Maddison & Zhang, 2023 – China, Malaysia
- Longarenus Simon, 1903 – Equatorial Guinea, Uganda, Nigeria
- Lophostica Simon, 1902 – Mauritius, Réunion
- Lumptibiella Rubio, Baigorria & Stolar, 2022 – Argentina
- Lurio Simon, 1901 – Trinidad and Tobago, South America
- Lyssomanes Hentz, 1845 – North America, South America, Lesser Antilles
- Lystrocteisa Simon, 1884 – New Caledonia
- Mabellina Chickering, 1946 – Panama
- Macaroeris Wunderlich, 1992 – Kazakhstan, Kyrgyzstan, Turkmenistan, Caucasus, Iran, Atlantic Islands, Macaronesia, Mediterranean to Azerbaijan, North Africa to Turkey, Chinese records misidentified. Introduced to Sri Lanka
- Macopaeus Simon, 1900 – Madagascar
- Macutula Ruiz, 2011 – Brazil
- Maddisonia Żabka, 2014 – Australia
- Madhyattus Prószyński, 1992 – India
- Maenola Simon, 1900 – Brazil, Guyana, Venezuela
- Maeota Simon, 1901 – Panama, Mexico, South America
- Maevia C. L. Koch, 1846 – Indonesia, North America, Peru
- Mago O. Pickard-Cambridge, 1882 – Brazil, Ecuador
- Magyarus Żabka, 1985 – Vietnam
- Maileus G. W. Peckham & E. G. Peckham, 1907 – Malaysia, Vietnam
- Malizna Wesołowska, 2021 – Uganda, Western Africa
- Malloneta Simon, 1902 – Gabon, Mozambique, Ghana, Ivory Coast, Nigeria, Sierre Leone
- Maltecora Simon, 1909 – São Tomé and Príncipe
- Mantisatta Warburton, 1900 – Indonesia, Malaysia, Philippines
- Mantius Thorell, 1891 – Indonesia, Malaysia
- Manzuma Azarkina, 2020 – Africa, Yemen, Central African Rep
- Maratus Karsch, 1878 – Australia, New Zealand. Introduced to New Zealand
- Marchena G. W. Peckham & E. G. Peckham, 1909 – United States
- Marengo G. W. Peckham & E. G. Peckham, 1892 – China, Thailand, India, Sri Lanka
- Margaromma Keyserling, 1882 – Cameroon, Malaysia, Australia, Fiji, New Guinea
- Maripanthus Maddison, 2020 – China, Indonesia, Malaysia, Singapore, India, Borneo
- Marma Simon, 1902 – South America
- Marpissa C. L. Koch, 1846 – Algeria, Morocco, Asia, Ukraine, Russia, Croatia, Cuba, Guatemala, North America, New Zealand, Brazil, Peru
- Martella G. W. Peckham & E. G. Peckham, 1892 – Panama, South America
- Marusyllus Prószyński, 2016 – Asia, Russia
- Massagris Simon, 1900 – Uganda, Lesotho, South Africa
- Matagaia Ruiz, Brescovit & Freitas, 2007 – Brazil
- Matinta Ruiz & Maddison, 2019 – South America
- Mburuvicha Scioscia, 1993 – Argentina
- Megaeupoa Lin & Li, 2020 – China, India
- Megafreya Edwards, 2015 – Argentina, Paraguay, Uruguay
- Megaloastia Żabka, 1995 – Australia
- Meleon Wanless, 1984 – Angola, Democratic Republic of the Congo, Madagascar, Uganda, Guinea, Ivory Coast, East Africa, Central, West
- Mendoza G. W. Peckham & E. G. Peckham, 1894 – Asia, Russia, North Africa
- Menemerus Simon, 1868 – Africa, Asia, Canary Islands, Southern Europe, Virgin Islands, Costa Rica, Guatemala, Mediterranean to Caucasus, North Africa, West Africa. Introduced to St. Helena, China, Japan, Taiwan, Vietnam, India, Turkey, United States, Australia, Argentina, Brazil, Chile, Pacific Islands, southern Europe, Central, North
- Messua G. W. Peckham & E. G. Peckham, 1896 – Costa Rica, El Salvador, Panama, Mexico, United States, Galapagos. Introduced to Hawaii
- Metacyrba F. O. Pickard-Cambridge, 1901 – Bonaire, Cuba, Hispaniola, Mexico, United States, Galapagos
- Metaphidippus F. O. Pickard-Cambridge, 1901 – Central America, Mexico, United States, South America
- Mexcala G. W. Peckham & E. G. Peckham, 1902 – Africa, Iran, Yemen
- Mexigonus Edwards, 2003 – Mexico, United States
- Microbianor Logunov, 2000 – Madagascar, Réunion, Seychelles, South Africa, Taiwan
- Microemathis Logunov, 2020 – Philippines
- Microhasarius Simon, 1902 – Indonesia, Malaysia
- Mikrus Wesołowska, 2001 – Kenya, Uganda
- Mintonia Wanless, 1984 – Southeast Asia, Borneo
- Modunda Simon, 1901 – China, Japan, Sri Lanka
- Mogrus Simon, 1882 – Africa, Asia, Russia, Southern Europe, France, Eastern Mediterranean
- Monaga Chickering, 1946 – Panama
- Mondeku Azarkina & Haddad, 2020 – Kenya
- Mopiopia Simon, 1902 – Cuba, Brazil
- Mopsolodes Żabka, 1991 – Australia, New Guinea
- Mopsus Karsch, 1878 – Australia, New Guinea
- Muziris Simon, 1901 – Indonesia, Australia, New Guinea, Vanuatu, Samoa
- Myrmage Prószyński, 2016 – China, Indonesia, Malaysia, Sri Lanka
- Myrmagua Prószyński, 2016 – Argentina
- Myrmanu Prószyński, 2016 – Madagascar
- Myrmapana Prószyński, 2016 – Costa Rica, Nicaragua, Panama, Argentina, Brazil
- Myrmapeni Prószyński, 2016 – Madagascar, China, Malaysia, Panama, Brazil
- Myrmaplata Prószyński, 2016 – China, Laos, Malaysia, Singapore, India, Sri Lanka
- Myrmarachne MacLeay, 1839 – Africa, Asia, Russia, Macaronesia, United States, Australia, Bolivia, East Africa, Sub-Saharan Africa, West Africa, Bali, Borneo, Caroline Is, Central, Mariana Is, West, Zanzibar. Introduced to North America
- Myrmatheca Prószyński, 2016 – Madagascar, Indonesia
- Myrmele Prószyński, 2016 – Madagascar
- Nagaina G. W. Peckham & E. G. Peckham, 1896 – Brazil
- Nandicius Prószyński, 2016 – Asia
- Nannenus Simon, 1902 – Indonesia, Philippines, Singapore
- Naphrys Edwards, 2003 – North America
- Napoca Simon, 1901 – Israel, Spain
- Natta Karsch, 1879 – Madagascar, Namibia, South Africa, Ghana, Guinea, Ivory Coast, Yemen, Tropical Africa
- Naubolus Simon, 1901 – South America
- Neaetha Simon, 1885 – Africa, Asia, Southern Europe, East Africa, Western Mediterranean to Germany, East
- Nebridia Simon, 1902 – Venezuela
- Necatia Özdikmen, 2007 – China
- Neobrettus Wanless, 1984 – China, Malaysia, Philippines, Vietnam, Bhutan, India, Borneo
- Neon Simon, 1876 – Algeria, Cape Verde, Asia, Azores, Ukraine, Russia, Greece, Spain, France, Cuba, North America, Australia, New Guinea, Bolivia, Central Europe to Kazakhstan, North Africa, Central, Southern, Western
- Neonella Gertsch, 1936 – Jamaica, Puerto Rico, United States, South America
- Nicylla Thorell, 1890 – Indonesia
- Nigorella Wesołowska & Tomasiewicz, 2008 – Africa, China, Thailand
- Nilakantha G. W. Peckham & E. G. Peckham, 1901 – Cuba, Hispaniola, Jamaica, Panama
- Nimbarus Rollard & Wesołowska, 2002 – Cameroon, Mozambique, Guinea
- Noegus Simon, 1900 – Guatemala, Panama, South America
- Nosferattus Ruiz & Brescovit, 2005 – Brazil
- Nungia Żabka, 1985 – China, Japan, Indonesia, Malaysia, Vietnam, Australia, New Guinea
- Nycerella Galiano, 1982 – St. Vincent, Guatemala, Panama, South America
- Ocrisiona Simon, 1901 – China, Australia, New Zealand
- Ogdenia G. W. Peckham, 1908 – China, Malaysia, Singapore, Vietnam
- Ohilimia Strand, 1911 – Indonesia, Australia, New Guinea
- Okinawicius Prószyński, 2016 – Ethiopia, Seychelles, China, Japan, India, Nepal, Saudi Arabia, Yemen
- Omoedus Thorell, 1881 – Indonesia, Fiji, New Guinea, Papua New Guinea
- Onofre Ruiz & Brescovit, 2007 – Brazil
- Onomastus Simon, 1900 – Asia, Borneo
- Opisthoncana Strand, 1913 – Papua New Guinea
- Opisthoncus L. Koch, 1880 – Australia, New Guinea, Papua New Guinea. Introduced to New Zealand
- Orcevia Thorell, 1890 – China, Southeast Asia
- Orientattus Caleb, 2020 – China, Japan, Vietnam, India, Nepal, Sri Lanka
- Orienticius Prószyński, 2016 – China, Japan, Korea, Russia
- Orsima Simon, 1901 – Congo, Gabon, Ivory Coast, Nigeria, Indonesia, Malaysia
- Orthrus Simon, 1900 – Philippines, Borneo
- Orvilleus Chickering, 1946 – Panama
- Osericta Simon, 1901 – Brazil, Peru
- Ourea Long, Vink & Paterson, 2025 – New Zealand
- Oviballus Azarkina & Haddad, 2020 – South Africa
- Pachomius G. W. Peckham & E. G. Peckham, 1896 – Grenada, Trinidad, Trinidad and Tobago, Guatemala, Panama, Mexico, South America
- Pachyballus Simon, 1900 – Africa, New Caledonia
- Pachyonomastus Caporiacco, 1947 – East Africa
- Pachypoessa Simon, 1902 – Madagascar
- Padilla G. W. Peckham & E. G. Peckham, 1894 – Eastern Africa, Indonesia
- Padillothorax Simon, 1901 – Asia
- Padillothorus Prószyński, 2018 – Indonesia
- Panachraesta Simon, 1900 – Sri Lanka
- Pancorius Simon, 1902 – Asia, Eastern, Southeastern Asia. Introduced to Poland?
- Pandisus Simon, 1900 – Madagascar, India
- Panysinus Simon, 1901 – Indonesia, Philippines, Thailand, India, Sri Lanka
- Papuamyr Maddison & Szűts, 2019 – Papua New Guinea
- Papuaneon Maddison, 2016 – Australia, Papua New Guinea
- Parabathippus Zhang & Maddison, 2012 – Southeast Asia, Borneo
- Paracyrba Żabka & Kovac, 1996 – Malaysia
- Paradamoetas G. W. Peckham & E. G. Peckham, 1885 – Panama, North America
- Paraeuophrys Logunov, 2020 – Indonesia, Fiji
- Parafluda Chickering, 1946 – Panama, Argentina, Brazil, Uruguay
- Paraharmochirus Szombathy, 1915 – New Guinea
- Paraheliophanus Clark & Benoit, 1977 – St. Helena
- Parahelpis Gardzińska & Żabka, 2010 – Australia
- Parajotus G. W. Peckham & E. G. Peckham, 1903 – Africa, Rep
- Paramaevia Barnes, 1955 – United States
- Paramarpissa F. O. Pickard-Cambridge, 1901 – Mexico, United States
- Paraneaetha Denis, 1947 – Egypt
- Paraphidippus F. O. Pickard-Cambridge, 1901 – Costa Rica, Honduras, Mexico, United States, Greater Antilles
- Paraphilaeus Żabka, 2003 – Australia
- Paraplatoides Żabka, 1992 – Australia, New Caledonia
- Paraplexippus Franganillo, 1930 – Cuba
- Parasaitis Bryant, 1950 – Jamaica
- Parathiodina Bryant, 1943 – Hispaniola
- Parnaenus G. W. Peckham & E. G. Peckham, 1896 – El Salvador, Guatemala, South America
- Parvattus Zhang & Maddison, 2012 – China
- Peckhamia Simon, 1900 – North America, Argentina, Brazil, Suriname, Dominican Rep
- Pelegrina Franganillo, 1930 – North America
- Pellenattus Maddison, 2017 – North America
- Pellenes Simon, 1876 – Africa, Asia, Europe, North America, Australia
- Pellolessertia Strand, 1929 – Cameroon, Democratic Republic of the Congo, Ethiopia, Uganda
- Pengmarengo Wang & Li, 2022 – China, Taiwan, Indonesia
- Penionomus Simon, 1903 – New Caledonia
- Pensacola G. W. Peckham & E. G. Peckham, 1885 – Guatemala, Panama, Mexico, South America
- Pensacolops Bauab-Vianna, 1983 – Brazil
- Peplometus Simon, 1900 – Africa
- Petemathis Prószyński & Deeleman-Reinhold, 2012 – Cuba, Puerto Rico
- Phaeacius Simon, 1900 – Asia
- Phanias F. O. Pickard-Cambridge, 1901 – El Salvador, Mexico, United States
- Phanuelus Caleb & Mathai, 2015 – India
- Pharacocerus Simon, 1902 – Africa
- Phasmolia Zhang & Maddison, 2012 – Papua New Guinea
- Phaulostylus Simon, 1902 – Madagascar
- Phausina Simon, 1902 – Indonesia, Sri Lanka
- Phenasurya Marathe & Maddison, 2025 – Thailand
- Phiale C. L. Koch, 1846 – Antigua and Barbuda, Cuba, Costa Rica, Guatemala, Panama, Mexico, South America
- Phidippus C. L. Koch, 1846 – Bangladesh, India, Cuba, El Salvador, North America, South America, possibly Panama. Introduced to India, Azores, Hawaii, Easter Island
- Philaeus Thorell, 1869 – Algeria, Morocco, Asia, Russia, Guatemala, North Africa to Middle East
- Philates Simon, 1900 – China, Indonesia, Malaysia, Philippines, Papua New Guinea
- Philira Edwards, 2015 – South America
- Phintella Strand, 1906 – Africa, Asia, Canary Islands, Russia, Australia, New Caledonia, North Africa, Caroline Is, Ghama
- Phintelloides Kanesharatnam & Benjamin, 2019 – Asia
- Phintellosa Wiśniewski & Wesołowska, 2024 – Angola, Uganda, Guinea
- Phlegra Simon, 1876 – Africa, Asia, Europe, North America, Australia, Portugal to Central Asia
- Phyaces Simon, 1902 – Sri Lanka
- Pignus Wesołowska, 2000 – Mozambique, Tanzania, South Africa, Zimbabwe
- Pilia Simon, 1902 – India, New Guinea
- Piranthus Thorell, 1895 – China, Malaysia, Myanmar, Singapore, India, Borneo
- Planamarengo Azarkina & Haddad, 2020 – Kenya, Uganda, South Africa
- Planiemen Wesołowska & van Harten, 2007 – Yemen
- Platycryptus Hill, 1979 – North America
- Platypsecas Caporiacco, 1955 – Venezuela
- Plesiopiuka Ruiz, 2010 – Brazil
- Plexippoides Prószyński, 1984 – Democratic Republic of the Congo, Uganda, Egypt, Sudan, Asia, Russia, Cyprus, Greece. Introduced to Ukraine
- Plexippus C. L. Koch, 1846 – Africa, Asia, Cyprus, Greece?, Mexico, Australia, New Guinea, Papua New Guinea, West Africa. Introduced to India, Nepal, Pakistan, Iran, Mexico, Australia, Pacific Islands, Pacific is, southern Asia, both Americas
- Pochyta Simon, 1901 – Africa
- Pochytoides Wesołowska, 2020 – Guinea, Ivory Coast
- Poecilorchestes Simon, 1901 – China, Indonesia, New Guinea, Borneo
- Poessa Simon, 1902 – Madagascar
- Popcornella Zhang & Maddison, 2012 – Hispaniola, Puerto Rico
- Porius Thorell, 1892 – Indonesia, Papua New Guinea
- Portia Karsch, 1878 – Africa, Asia, Central, East, West
- Poultonella G. W. Peckham & E. G. Peckham, 1909 – United States
- Pristobaeus Simon, 1902 – Indonesia, Malaysia, Australia, Fiji, New Guinea, Papua New Guinea, Borneo, Caroline Is
- Proctonemesia Bauab-Vianna & Soares, 1978 – Brazil
- Propiomarengo Azarkina & Haddad, 2020 – South Africa
- Prostheclina Keyserling, 1882 – Australia, Eastern Australia
- Proszynellus Patoleta & Żabka, 2015 – Australia
- Proszynskia Kanesharatnam & Benjamin, 2019 – India, Sri Lanka
- Proszynskiana Logunov, 1996 – Central Asia, Mongolia, Iran?
- Protaeus Ni, Yu & Zhang, 2025 – China
- Psecas C. L. Koch, 1850 – Trinidad, Panama, South America
- Psenuc Prószyński, 2016 – Mozambique, Namibia, South Africa, China, Indonesia, Philippines, Vietnam, Australia, Papua New Guinea, Solomon Islands, Marshall Islands, Caroline Is
- Pseudamycus Simon, 1885 – Indonesia, Malaysia, Vietnam, Bhutan, India, Papua New Guinea
- Pseudemathis Simon, 1902 – Mauritius, Réunion
- Pseudeuophrys Dahl, 1912 – Asia, Azores, Madeira, Russia, Greece, Italy, Spain. Introduced to United States
- Pseudicius Simon, 1885 – Africa, Asia, Bulgaria, Albania, Cyprus, Greece, France, Fiji, Samoa, Brazil, Europe to Kazakhstan, Mediterranean to Azerbaijan, Caroline Is
- Pseudocorythalia Caporiacco, 1938 – Guatemala
- Pseudofluda Mello-Leitão, 1928 – Argentina, Brazil
- Pseudomaevia Rainbow, 1920 – Australia, Tahiti
- Pseudomogrus Simon, 1937 – Northern Africa, Asia, Europe, Central Asia to Mongolia, Eastern Europe to Kazakhstan, North Africa
- Pseudopartona Caporiacco, 1954 – French Guiana
- Pseudoplexippus Caporiacco, 1947 – Tanzania
- Pseudosynagelides Żabka, 1991 – Australia
- Ptocasius Simon, 1885 – Asia
- Pulcherula Wesołowska & Russell-Smith, 2022 – Guinea, Ivory Coast
- Pungalina Richardson, 2013 – Australia
- Pystira Simon, 1901 – Indonesia, Pakistan, New Guinea
- Qingattus Yang, Wang & Zhang, 2024 – China
- Qiongattus Wang & Li, 2023 – China
- Quadrica Wesołowska & Wiśniewski, 2023 – Angola, Gabon, Mozambique
- Rafalus Prószyński, 1999 – Egypt, Kazakhstan, Bhutan, Western Asia
- Ragatinus Dawidowicz & Wesołowska, 2016 – Kenya
- Rarahu Berland, 1929 – Samoa
- Rhene Thorell, 1869 – Africa, Asia, Russia, Guyana, Peru
- Rhenefictus Logunov, 2021 – China, Vietnam
- Rhetenor Simon, 1902 – United States, Brazil
- Rhombonotus L. Koch, 1879 – Australia
- Rhondes Simon, 1901 – New Caledonia
- Rhyphelia Simon, 1902 – South America
- Rishaschia Makhan, 2006 – South America
- Rogmocrypta Simon, 1900 – Philippines, Singapore, New Caledonia
- Rudakius Prószyński, 2016 – Egypt, Asia
- Rudra G. W. Peckham & E. G. Peckham, 1885 – Guatemala, Panama, South America
- Rumburak Wesołowska, Azarkina & Russell-Smith, 2014 – South Africa
- Ruwenzorek Wiśniewski & Wesołowska, 2024 – Uganda
- Saaristattus Logunov & Azarkina, 2008 – Malaysia
- Sadies Wanless, 1984 – Réunion, Seychelles, Guinea
- Saitidops Simon, 1901 – Jamaica, Venezuela
- Saitis Simon, 1876 – Gabon, Libya, Ivory Coast, Indonesia, India, Sri Lanka, Georgia, Turkey, Europe, Jamaica, Australia, New Caledonia, Vanuatu, Kiribati, South America, southern Europe to Turkey, Central Australia, Timor. Introduced to Germany, Belgium, Netherlands
- Saitissus Roewer, 1938 – Indonesia
- Salpesia Simon, 1901 – Seychelles, Australia
- Salticus Latreille, 1804 – Madagascar, Algeria, Morocco, South Africa, Asia, Europe, Mexico, United States, Australia, Papua New Guinea, Argentina, Brazil, Mediterranean to Central Asia, North Africa. Introduced to Argentina
- Sandalodes Keyserling, 1883 – Indonesia, Australia, New Guinea
- Saphrys Zhang & Maddison, 2015 – Argentina, Brazil, Chile
- Saraina Wanless & Clark, 1975 – Africa, Rep
- Sarinda G. W. Peckham & E. G. Peckham, 1892 – Costa Rica, Nicaragua, Panama, Mexico, United States, South America
- Sarindoides Mello-Leitão, 1922 – Brazil
- Sassacus G. W. Peckham & E. G. Peckham, 1895 – North America, South America
- Schenkelia Lessert, 1927 – Africa
- Scopocira Simon, 1900 – Trinidad, Trinidad and Tobago, Costa Rica, Panama, South America
- Scoturius Simon, 1901 – Argentina, Brazil, Paraguay
- Sebastira Simon, 1901 – Panama, Venezuela
- Selimus G. W. Peckham & E. G. Peckham, 1901 – Brazil
- Semiopyla Simon, 1901 – Panama, Mexico, South America
- Semnolius Simon, 1902 – Argentina, Brazil
- Semora G. W. Peckham & E. G. Peckham, 1892 – Argentina, Brazil, Venezuela
- Semorina Simon, 1901 – Argentina, Venezuela
- Servaea Simon, 1888 – Indonesia, Australia
- Sibianor Logunov, 2001 – Kenya, Botswana, South Africa, Asia, Russia, North America
- Sidusa G. W. Peckham & E. G. Peckham, 1895 – North America, South America, Borneo
- Sigytes Simon, 1902 – Sri Lanka, Australia
- Siler Simon, 1889 – Asia
- Simaetha Thorell, 1881 – China, Indonesia, Philippines, Singapore, Sri Lanka, Australia, New Guinea, Papua New Guinea
- Simaethula Simon, 1902 – Australia
- Simaethulina Wesołowska, 2012 – Democratic Republic of the Congo, Mozambique
- Similaria Prószyński, 1992 – India
- Simonurius Galiano, 1988 – South America
- Simprulla Simon, 1901 – Argentina
- Sinoinsula Zhou & Li, 2013 – China
- Sittisax Prószyński, 2017 – Japan, Mongolia, Russia
- Sobasina Simon, 1898 – Indonesia, Malaysia, Melanesia, Palau, Tonga
- Soesiladeepakius Makhan, 2007 – Brazil, Suriname
- Sondra Wanless, 1988 – Australia
- Sonoita G. W. Peckham & E. G. Peckham, 1903 – Ethiopia, Mozambique, Uganda, South Africa, Zimbabwe, Ivory Coast, India?
- Spadera G. W. Peckham & E. G. Peckham, 1894 – Madagascar
- Sparbambus Zhang, Woon & Li, 2006 – China, Malaysia, India
- Spartaeus Thorell, 1891 – Asia
- Sphericula Wesołowska & Russell-Smith, 2022 – Ivory Coast
- Spilargis Simon, 1902 – Indonesia, New Guinea
- Spiralembolus Wang & Li, 2023 – China
- Stagetillus Simon, 1885 – Indonesia, Malaysia, Philippines
- Stenaelurillus Simon, 1886 – Africa, Asia
- Stenodeza Simon, 1900 – Argentina, Brazil
- Stergusa Simon, 1889 – Indonesia, Sri Lanka, New Caledonia
- Stertinius Simon, 1890 – China, Japan, Indonesia, Malaysia, Philippines, Mariana Is
- Stoidis Simon, 1901 – St. Vincent, Venezuela
- Sumakuru Maddison, 2016 – Colombia, Ecuador
- Sumampattus Galiano, 1983 – South America
- Sympolymnia Perger & Rubio, 2020 – South America
- Synageles Simon, 1876 – Algeria, Egypt, Tunisia, Asia, Europe, Bahamas, North America. Introduced to Azores, Canada
- Synagelides Strand, 1906 – Asia, Russia
- Synemosyna Hentz, 1846 – North America, South America
- Tabuina Maddison, 2009 – Papua New Guinea
- Tacuna G. W. Peckham & E. G. Peckham, 1901 – Argentina, Brazil
- Taivala G. W. Peckham & E. G. Peckham, 1907 – Malaysia
- Talavera G. W. Peckham & E. G. Peckham, 1909 – Asia, Europe, North America, Europe to Central Asia, France to Central Asia, Central, Northern
- Tamigalesus Żabka, 1988 – India, Sri Lanka
- Tanybelus Simon, 1902 – Brazil, Colombia, Venezuela
- Tanzania Koçak & Kemal, 2008 – Ethiopia, Tanzania, South Africa, Ivory Coast, Nigeria, India
- Tapsatella Rubio & Stolar, 2020 – Argentina
- Tara G. W. Peckham & E. G. Peckham, 1886 – Australia
- Taraxella Wanless, 1984 – Indonesia, Malaysia
- Tarkas Edwards, 2015 – Guatemala, Mexico
- Tarne Simon, 1886 – Cameroon, Congo, Gabon, Guinea, Rep
- Tarodes Pocock, 1898 – Papua New Guinea
- Tartamura Bustamante & Ruiz, 2017 – Argentina, Brazil, Ecuador
- Tasa Wesołowska, 1981 – China, Japan, Korea
- Tatari Berland, 1938 – Vanuatu
- Tauala Wanless, 1988 – Australia
- Telamonia Thorell, 1887 – Equatorial Guinea, Gabon, Mali, Asia, Papua New Guinea, Borneo
- Tenkana Marathe, Maddison & Caleb, 2024 – India, Sri Lanka
- Tenuiballus Azarkina & Haddad, 2020 – South Africa
- Terralonus Maddison, 1996 – North America
- Thaiattus Logunov, 2020 – Thailand
- Thammaca Simon, 1901 – Brazil, Peru
- Theriella Braul & Lise, 1996 – Argentina, Brazil
- Thiania C. L. Koch, 1846 – Asia, Borneo. Introduced to Hawaii
- Thianitara Simon, 1903 – Indonesia, Malaysia, Thailand
- Thiodina Simon, 1900 – Dominican Rep, Mexico, United States, South America
- Thiratoscirtus Simon, 1886 – Africa, Brazil, West Africa, Rep
- Thorelliola Strand, 1942 – Southeast Asia, New Guinea, Marshall Islands, Caroline Is. Introduced to Hawaii, French Polynesia, Samoa
- Thrandina Maddison, 2006 – Colombia, Ecuador
- Thyene Simon, 1885 – Africa, Asia, Greece, Spain, Australia, East Africa, Middle East to Central Asia, Sub-Saharan Africa, Bali, North, West. Introduced to France, Brazil
- Thyenillus Simon, 1909 – Equatorial Guinea
- Thyenula Simon, 1902 – Mozambique, Uganda, Egypt, Lesotho, South Africa, Zimbabwe
- Tisaniba Zhang & Maddison, 2014 – Indonesia, Malaysia
- Tisanibainepta Logunov, 2020 – Malaysia, Philippines
- Titanattus G. W. Peckham & E. G. Peckham, 1885 – Guatemala, Panama, Mexico, South America
- Toloella Chickering, 1946 – Panama
- Tomis F. O. Pickard-Cambridge, 1901 – Puerto Rico, Virgin Is, Mexico, United States, South America
- Tomobella Szűts & Scharff, 2009 – Madagascar
- Tomocyrba Simon, 1900 – Madagascar
- Tomomingi Szűts & Scharff, 2009 – Equatorial Guinea, Kenya, Tanzania, Uganda, South Africa, Guinea
- Toticoryx Rollard & Wesołowska, 2002 – Guinea
- Toxeus C. L. Koch, 1846 – Asia
- Trapezocephalus Berland & Millot, 1941 – Africa, Yemen, East Africa, West Africa, Central, West
- Triggella Edwards, 2015 – El Salvador, Guatemala, Panama, Venezuela
- Trite Simon, 1885 – Australia, New Caledonia, New Zealand, Samoa, Tonga, Austral Is, Caroline Is, Loyalty Is
- Truncattus Zhang & Maddison, 2012 – Haiti, Hispaniola, Turks & Caicos
- Trydarssus Galiano, 1995 – Argentina, Chile, Paraguay
- Tubalaxia Satkunanathan & Benjamin, 2024 – India, Sri Lanka
- Tullgrenella Mello-Leitão, 1941 – South America
- Tulpius G. W. Peckham & E. G. Peckham, 1896 – Guatemala, Panama, Brazil
- Tusitala G. W. Peckham & E. G. Peckham, 1902 – Africa, Yemen
- Tutelina Simon, 1901 – North America, Ecuador, Guyana
- Tuvaphantes Logunov, 1993 – Russia
- Tylogonus Simon, 1902 – Panama, South America
- Udalmella Galiano, 1994 – Panama
- Udvardya Prószyński, 1992 – Indonesia, Papua New Guinea
- Uluella Chickering, 1946 – Panama, Ecuador
- Ureta Wesołowska & Haddad, 2013 – Kenya, South Africa
- Uroballus Simon, 1902 – China, Malaysia, Vietnam, India, Sri Lanka
- Urogelides Żabka, 2009 – Australia
- Urupuyu Ruiz & Maddison, 2015 – Ecuador
- Uxuma Simon, 1902 – Gabon
- Vailimia Kammerer, 2006 – China, Malaysia, India
- Vallvonas Szűts, Zhang, Gallé-Szpisjak & De Bakker, 2020 – Papua New Guinea
- Variratina Zhang & Maddison, 2012 – New Guinea
- Vatovia Caporiacco, 1940 – Ethiopia
- Veissella Wanless, 1984 – Comoros, Mayotte, South Africa
- Viciria Thorell, 1877 – Gabon, South Africa, Guinea-Bissau, Southeast Asia, India, Sri Lanka, West Africa
- Vicirionessa Wesołowska & Russell-Smith, 2022 – Africa
- Vinnius Simon, 1902 – Argentina, Brazil, Paraguay
- Viribestus Zhang & Maddison, 2012 – Indonesia, Papua New Guinea
- Viroqua G. W. Peckham & E. G. Peckham, 1901 – Australia
- Wallaba Mello-Leitão, 1940 – Guyana
- Wandawe Azarkina & Haddad, 2020 – Kenya, Uganda, South Africa
- Wanlessia Wijesinghe, 1992 – Taiwan, Malaysia
- Waymadda Szűts, Zhang, Gallé-Szpisjak & De Bakker, 2020 – Papua New Guinea
- Wedoquella Galiano, 1984 – Argentina, Bolivia, Paraguay
- Wesolowskana Koçak & Kemal, 2008 – Cape Verde
- Xanthofreya Edwards, 2015 – Costa Rica, Guatemala, Panama, Brazil, Colombia, Venezuela
- Xenocytaea Berry, Beatty & Prószyński, 1998 – Fiji, New Guinea, Solomon Islands, Caroline Is
- Xuriella Wesołowska & Russell-Smith, 2000 – Tanzania, South Africa, Zimbabwe, Yemen
- Yacuitella Galiano, 1999 – Argentina
- Yaginumaella Prószyński, 1979 – Asia, Russia
- Yaginumanis Wanless, 1984 – China, Japan
- Yamangalea Maddison, 2009 – Australia, Papua New Guinea
- Yeiyei Wesołowska & Henrard, 2025 – Guinea
- Yepoella Galiano, 1970 – Argentina
- Yimbulunga Wesołowska, Azarkina & Russell-Smith, 2014 – South Africa
- Yllenus Simon, 1868 – Asia, Hungary, Bulgaria, Romania, Ukraine, Russia, Central
- Yogetor Wesołowska & Russell-Smith, 2000 – Ethiopia, Tanzania
- Zabka Wang, Li & Pham, 2023 – China, Vietnam
- Zabkattus Zhang & Maddison, 2012 – New Guinea
- Zebraplatys Żabka, 1992 – Taiwan, Australia
- Zenodorus G. W. Peckham & E. G. Peckham, 1886 – Indonesia, Australia, Melanesia, Samoa, Pacific Islands, Caroline Is, Tahiti, to Australia
- Zulunigma Wesołowska & Cumming, 2011 – South Africa, Zimbabwe
- Zuniga G. W. Peckham & E. G. Peckham, 1892 – Mexico, South America
- Zygoballus G. W. Peckham & E. G. Peckham, 1885 – Cuba, Jamaica, Guatemala, Panama, North America, Argentina, Guyana, Suriname

The genera of the family Salticidae listed below are those that are extant and accepted by the World Spider Catalog as of August 2020. Assignment to subfamilies and clades is based on Maddison (2015), except where otherwise shown. Unless sources indicate otherwise, genera that were split after 2015 are given the same placements as the original genera listed in Maddison (2015).

== Subfamily Onomastinae ==
Onomastinae Maddison, 2015

- Onomastus Simon, 1900

== Subfamily Asemoneinae ==
Asemoneinae Maddison, 2015

- Asemonea O. Pickard-Cambridge, 1869
- Goleba Wanless, 1980
- Macopaeus Simon, 1900
- Pandisus Simon, 1900

== Subfamily Lyssomaninae ==
Lyssomaninae Blackwall, 1877

- Chinoscopus Simon, 1901
- Hindumanes Logunov, 2004, transferred from Asemoneinae to Lyssomaninae
- Lyssomanes Hentz, 1845
- Sumakuru Maddison, 2016

== Subfamily Spartaeinae ==
Spartaeinae Wanless, 1984

- Allococalodes Wanless, 1982
- Amilaps Maddison, 2019
- Brettus Thorell, 1895
- Cocalodes Pocock, 1897
- Cocalus C. L. Koch, 1846
- Cucudeta Maddison, 2009
- Cyrba Simon, 1876
- Depreissia Lessert, 1942
- Galianora Maddison, 2006
- Gelotia Thorell, 1890
- Holcolaetis Simon, 1886
- Lapsamita Ruiz, 2013
- Lapsias Simon, 1900
- Meleon Wanless, 1984
- Mintonia Wanless, 1984
- Neobrettus Wanless, 1984
- Paracyrba Żabka & Kovac, 1996
- Phaeacius Simon, 1900
- Portia Karsch, 1878
- Soesiladeepakius Makhan, 2007
- Sonoita Peckham & Peckham, 1903
- Sparbambus Zhang, Woon & Li, 2006
- Spartaeus Thorell, 1891
- Tabuina Maddison, 2009
- Taraxella Wanless, 1984
- Thrandina Maddison, 2006
- Veissella Wanless, 1984
- Wanlessia Wijesinghe, 1992
- Yaginumanis Wanless, 1984
- Yamangalea Maddison, 2009

== Subfamily Eupoinae ==
Eupoinae Maddison, 2015

- Corusca Zhou & Li, 2013
- Eupoa Żabka, 1985
- Megaeupoa Lin & Li, 2020, considered related to Eupoa, so a possible member of Eupoinae
- Sinoinsula Zhou & Li, 2013

== Subfamily Hisponinae ==
Hisponinae Simon, 1901

- Hispo Simon, 1886
- Jerzego Maddison, 2014
- Massagris Simon, 1900
- Tomobella Szűts & Scharff, 2009
- Tomocyrba Simon, 1900
- Tomomingi Szűts & Scharff, 2009

== Subfamily Salticinae ==
Salticinae Blackwall, 1841

=== Clade Amycoida ===
Amycoida Maddison & Hedin, 2003

- Acragas Simon, 1900
- Admesturius Galiano, 1988
- Aillutticus Galiano, 1987
- Amatorculus Ruiz & Brescovit, 2005
- Amycus C. L. Koch, 1846
- Anaurus Simon, 1900
- Arachnomura Mello-Leitão, 1917
- Arnoliseus Braul, 2002
- Atelurius Simon, 1901
- Atomosphyrus Simon, 1902
- Attinella Banks, 1905
- Attulus Simon, 1889, syn. Sitticus Simon, 1901
- Banksetosa Chickering, 1946
- Breda Peckham & Peckham, 1894
- Capeta Ruiz & Brescovit, 2005
- Carabella Chickering, 1946
- Ceriomura Simon, 1901
- Colonus F. O. Pickard-Cambridge, 1901
- Corcovetella Galiano, 1975
- Cotinusa Simon, 1900
- Cylistella Simon, 1901
- Cyllodania Simon, 1902
- Druzia Ruiz & Brescovit, 2013
- Encolpius Simon, 1900
- Erica Peckham & Peckham, 1892
- Fluda Peckham & Peckham, 1892
- Frespera Braul & Lise, 2002
- Gavarilla Ruiz & Brescovit, 2006
- Gypogyna Simon, 1900
- Hurius Simon, 1901
- Hyetussa Simon, 1902, including Bredana Gertsch, 1936 and Micalula Strand, 1932
- Hypaeus Simon, 1900
- Jollas Simon, 1901
- Letoia Simon, 1900
- Macutula Ruiz, 2011
- Maenola Simon, 1900
- Mago O. Pickard-Cambridge, 1882
- Martella Peckham & Peckham, 1892
- Matinta Ruiz & Maddison, 2019
- Nilakantha Peckham & Peckham, 1901
- Noegus Simon, 1900
- Nosferattus Ruiz & Brescovit, 2005
- Orvilleus Chickering, 1946
- Parafluda Chickering, 1946
- Parathiodina Bryant, 1943
- Proctonemesia Bauab & Soares, 1978
- Sarinda Peckham & Peckham, 1892
- Scopocira Simon, 1900
- Scoturius Simon, 1901
- Semiopyla Simon, 1901
- Simonurius Galiano, 1988
- Simprulla Simon, 1901
- Sittisax Prószyński, 2017
- Synemosyna Hentz, 1846
- Tartamura Bustamante & Ruiz, 2017
- Tanybelus Simon, 1902
- Thiodina Simon, 1900
- Titanattus Peckham & Peckham, 1885, including Agelista
- Toloella Chickering, 1946
- Tomis F. O. Pickard-Cambridge, 1901, syn. Pseudattulus Caporiacco, 1947
- Urupuyu Ruiz & Maddison, 2015
- Vinnius Simon, 1902
- Zuniga Peckham & Peckham, 1892

=== Clade Salticoida ===
Salticoida Maddison & Hedin, 2003

- Abracadabrella Żabka, 1991
- Admestina Peckham & Peckham, 1888
- Aelurillus Simon, 1884
- Afraflacilla Berland & Millot, 1941
- Afrobeata Caporiacco, 1941
- Afromarengo Benjamin, 2004
- Agobardus Keyserling, 1885
- Agorioides Maddison & Szűts, 2019
- Agorius Thorell, 1877
- Ahijuna Rubio, Baigorria & Stolar, 2022
- Ajaraneola Wesołowska & Russell-Smith, 2011
- Akela Peckham & Peckham, 1896
- Alcmena C. L. Koch, 1846
- Alfenus Simon, 1902
- Ansienulina Wesołowska, 2015
- Allodecta Bryant, 1950
- Amphidraus Simon, 1900
- Anarrhotus Simon, 1902
- Anasaitis Bryant, 1950
- Anicius Chamberlin, 1925
- Anokopsis Bauab & Soares, 1980
- Antillattus Bryant, 1943
- Aphirape C. L. Koch, 1850
- Apricia Richardson, 2016
- Araegeus Simon, 1901
- Araneotanna Özdikmen & Kury, 2006
- Arasia Simon, 1901
- Artabrus Simon, 1902
- Aruattus Logunov & Azarkina, 2008
- Asaphobelis Simon, 1902, included in Coryphasia by Zhang & Maddison (2015)
- Asaracus C. L. Koch, 1846
- Ascyltus Karsch, 1878
- Ashtabula Peckham & Peckham, 1894
- Asianellus Logunov & Heciak, 1996
- Astia L. Koch, 1879
- Astilodes Żabka, 2009
- Athamas O. Pickard-Cambridge, 1877
- Attidops Banks, 1905
- Augustaea Szombathy, 1915
- Avarua Marples, 1955
- Avitus Peckham & Peckham, 1896
- Bacelarella Berland & Millot, 1941
- Bagheera Peckham & Peckham, 1896
- Ballus C. L. Koch, 1850
- Balmaceda Peckham & Peckham, 1894
- Barraina Richardson, 2013
- Baryphas Simon, 1902
- Bathippus Thorell, 1892
- Bavia Simon, 1877
- Baviola Simon, 1898
- Bavirecta Kanesharatnam & Benjamin, 2018
- Beata Peckham & Peckham, 1895
- Belippo Simon, 1909
- Belliena Simon, 1902
- Bellota Peckham & Peckham, 1892
- Bianor Peckham & Peckham, 1886, including Stichius Thorell, 1890
- Bindax Thorell, 1892
- Bocus Peckham & Peckham, 1892
- Brancus Simon, 1902
- Bristowia Reimoser, 1934
- Bryantella Chickering, 1946
- Bulolia Żabka, 1996
- Burmattus Prószyński, 1992
- Bythocrotus Simon, 1903
- Canama Simon, 1903
- Capidava Simon, 1902
- Caribattus Bryant, 1950
- Carrhotus Thorell, 1891
- Cembalea Wesołowska, 1993
- Cerionesta Simon, 1901
- Chalcolecta Simon, 1884
- Chalcolemia Zhang & Maddison, 2012
- Chalcoscirtus Bertkau, 1880
- Chalcotropis Simon, 1902
- Chapoda Peckham & Peckham, 1896
- Charippus Thorell, 1895
- Cheliceroides Żabka, 1985
- Cheliferoides F. O. Pickard-Cambridge, 1901
- Chinattus Logunov, 1999
- Chinophrys Zhang & Maddison, 2012
- Chira Peckham & Peckham, 1896
- Chirothecia Taczanowski, 1878
- Chrysilla Thorell, 1887
- Clynotis Simon, 1901
- Cobanus F. O. Pickard-Cambridge, 1900, included in Sidusa by Zhang & Maddison (2015)
- Coccorchestes Thorell, 1881
- Colaxes Simon, 1900
- Colyttus Thorell, 1891
- Commoris Simon, 1902
- Compsodecta Simon, 1903
- Copocrossa Simon, 1901
- Corambis Simon, 1901
- Corticattus Zhang & Maddison, 2012
- Coryphasia Simon, 1902
- Corythalia C. L. Koch, 1850
- Cosmophasis Simon, 1901
- Curubis Simon, 1902
- Cynapes Simon, 1900
- Cytaea Keyserling, 1882
- Damoetas Peckham & Peckham, 1886
- Darwinneon Cutler, 1971
- Dasycyptus Simon, 1902
- Dendryphantes C. L. Koch, 1837
- Descanso Peckham & Peckham, 1892
- Detalik Wesołowska, 2021
- Dexippus Thorell, 1891
- Diolenius Thorell, 1870
- Diplocanthopoda Abraham, 1925
- Donaldius Chickering, 1946
- Drizztius Edwards, 2015
- Eburneana Wesołowska & Szűts, 2001
- Echeclus Thorell, 1890
- Echinussa Simon, 1901
- Ecuadattus Zhang & Maddison, 2012
- Edilemma Ruiz & Brescovit, 2006
- Edwardsya Ruiz & Bustamante, 2016
- Efate Berland, 1938
- Emathis Simon, 1899
- Emertonius Peckham & Peckham, 1892, included in Myrmarachne in 2015
- Empanda Simon, 1903
- Encymachus Simon, 1902
- Enoplomischus Giltay, 1931
- Epeus Peckham & Peckham, 1886
- Epocilla Thorell, 1887
- Erasinus Simon, 1899
- Ergane L. Koch, 1881
- Eris C. L. Koch, 1846
- Euochin Prószyński, 2018
- Euophrys C. L. Koch, 1834
- Euryattus Thorell, 1881
- Eustiromastix Simon, 1902
- Evarcha Simon, 1902
- Featheroides Peng, Yin, Xie & Kim, 1994
- Festucula Simon, 1901
- Foliabitus Zhang & Maddison, 2012
- Frewena Richardson, 2013
- Freya C. L. Koch, 1850
- Frigga C. L. Koch, 1850
- Fritzia O. Pickard-Cambridge, 1879
- Fuentes Peckham & Peckham, 1894
- Furculattus Balogh, 1980
- Gastromicans Mello-Leitão, 1917
- Gedea Simon, 1902
- Ghatippus Marathe & Maddison, 2024
- Ghelna Maddison, 1996
- Goleta Peckham & Peckham, 1894
- Gorgasella Chickering, 1946
- Gramenca Rollard & Wesołowska, 2002
- Habrocestoides Prószyński, 1992
- Habrocestum Simon, 1876
- Habronattus F. O. Pickard-Cambridge, 1901
- Hakka Berry & Prószyński, 2001
- Harmochirus Simon, 1885
- Hasarina Schenkel, 1963
- Hasarius Simon, 1871
- Havaika Prószyński, 2002
- Helicius Żabka, 1981
- Heliophanillus Prószyński, 1989
- Heliophanus C. L. Koch, 1833
- Helpis Simon, 1901
- Helvetia Peckham & Peckham, 1894
- Hentzia Marx, 1883
- Heratemita Strand, 1932
- Hermosa Peckham & Peckham, 1892 (syn. Myrmavola Prószyński, 2016), included in Myrmarachne in 2015
- Hermotimus Simon, 1903
- Holoplatys Simon, 1885
- Huntiglennia Żabka & Gray, 2004
- Hyllus C. L. Koch, 1846
- Hypoblemum Peckham & Peckham, 1886
- Icius Simon, 1876
- Idastrandia Strand, 1929
- Ilargus Simon, 1901
- Imperceptus Prószyński, 1992
- Indomarengo Benjamin, 2004
- Indopadilla Caleb & Sankaran, 2019, considered close to Padillothorax
- Iona Peckham & Peckham, 1886
- Iranattus Prószyński, 1992, including Monomotapa Wesołowska, 2000
- Irura Peckham & Peckham, 1901
- Itata Peckham & Peckham, 1894
- Jacksonoides Wanless, 1988
- Jaluiticola Roewer, 1944
- Jotus L. Koch, 1881
- Judalana Rix, 1999
- Junxattus Prószyński & Deeleman-Reinhold, 2012, included in Laufeia by Zhang & Maddison (2015)
- Kakameganula Wesołowska, 2020
- Kalcerrytus Galiano, 2000
- Katya Prószyński & Deeleman-Reinhold, 2010
- Kima Peckham & Peckham, 1902
- Kupiuka Ruiz, 2010
- Lagnus L. Koch, 1879
- Lakarobius Berry, Beatty & Prószyński, 1998
- Lamottella Rollard & Wesołowska, 2002
- Langelurillus Próchniewicz, 1994
- Langerra Żabka, 1985
- Langona Simon, 1901
- Laufeia Simon, 1889
- Lauharulla Keyserling, 1883
- Lechia Żabka, 1985
- Leikung Benjamin, 2004
- Lepidemathis Simon, 1903
- Leptathamas Balogh, 1980
- Leptofreya Edwards, 2015
- Leptorchestes Thorell, 1870
- Leviea Maddison & Szűts, 2019
- Ligonipes Karsch, 1878
- Ligurra Simon, 1903
- Longarenus Simon, 1903
- Lophostica Simon, 1902
- Lurio Simon, 1901
- Lystrocteisa Simon, 1884
- Mabellina Chickering, 1946
- Macaroeris Wunderlich, 1992
- Madhyattus Prószyński, 1992
- Maeota Simon, 1901
- Maevia C. L. Koch, 1846
- Magyarus Żabka, 1985
- Maileus Peckham & Peckham, 1907
- Malloneta Simon, 1902
- Mantisatta Warburton, 1900
- Mantius Thorell, 1891
- Manzuma Azarkina, 2020
- Maratus Karsch, 1878
- Marchena Peckham & Peckham, 1909
- Marengo Peckham & Peckham, 1892
- Margaromma Keyserling, 1882
- Marma Simon, 1902
- Marpissa C. L. Koch, 1846
- Marusyllus Prószyński, 2016, separated from Yllenus in 2016
- Matagaia Ruiz, Brescovit & Freitas, 2007
- Mburuvicha Scioscia, 1993
- Megafreya Edwards, 2015
- Megaloastia Żabka, 1995
- Mendoza Peckham & Peckham, 1894
- Menemerus Simon, 1868
- Messua Peckham & Peckham, 1896
- Metacyrba F. O. Pickard-Cambridge, 1901
- Metaphidippus F. O. Pickard-Cambridge, 1901
- Mexcala Peckham & Peckham, 1902
- Mexigonus Edwards, 2003
- Microbianor Logunov, 2000
- Mikrus Wesołowska, 2001
- Mirandia Badcock, 1932
- Modunda Simon, 1901
- Mogrus Simon, 1882
- Monaga Chickering, 1946
- Mopiopia Simon, 1902
- Mopsolodes Żabka, 1991
- Mopsus Karsch, 1878
- Myrmage Prószyński, 2016, separated from Myrmarachne in 2016
- Myrmagua Prószyński, 2016, separated from Myrmarachne in 2016
- Myrmanu Prószyński, 2016, separated from Myrmarachne in 2016
- Myrmapana Prószyński, 2016, separated from Myrmarachne in 2016
- Myrmapeni Prószyński, 2016, separated from Myrmarachne in 2016
- Myrmaplata Prószyński, 2016, separated from Myrmarachne in 2016
- Myrmarachne MacLeay, 1839
- Myrmatheca Prószyński, 2016, separated from Myrmarachne in 2016
- Myrmele Prószyński, 2016, separated from Myrmarachne in 2016
- Nagaina Peckham & Peckham, 1896
- Nandicius Prószyński, 2016, separated from Pseudicius in 2016
- Nannenus Simon, 1902
- Naphrys Edwards, 2003
- Napoca Simon, 1901
- Natta Karsch, 1879
- Naubolus Simon, 1901
- Neaetha Simon, 1884
- Nebridia Simon, 1902, included in Amphidraus by Zhang & Maddison (2015)
- Neon Simon, 1876
- Neonella Gertsch, 1936
- Nepalicius Prószyński, 2016, separated from Pseudicius in 2016
- Nicylla Thorell, 1890, included in Thiania by Zhang & Maddison (2015)
- Nigorella Wesołowska & Tomasiewicz, 2008
- Nimbarus Rollard & Wesołowska, 2002
- Nungia Żabka, 1985
- Nycerella Galiano, 1982
- Ocrisiona Simon, 1901
- Ogdenia Peckham & Peckham, 1908
- Ohilimia Strand, 1911
- Okinawicius Prószyński, 2016, separated from Pseudicius in 2016
- Omoedus Thorell, 1881
- Onofre Ruiz & Brescovit, 2007
- Opisthoncana Strand, 1913
- Opisthoncus L. Koch, 1880
- Orcevia Thorell, 1890, included in Laufeia by Zhang & Maddison (2015)
- Orientattus Caleb, 2020
- Orienticius Prószyński, 2016, separated from Pseudicius in 2016
- Orsima Simon, 1901
- Orthrus Simon, 1900
- Osericta Simon, 1901
- Pachomius Peckham & Peckham, 1896
- Pachyballus Simon, 1900
- Pachyonomastus Caporiacco, 1947
- Padilla Peckham & Peckham, 1894
- Padillothorax Simon, 1901, included in Stagetillus in 2015
- Panachraesta Simon, 1900, included in Myrmarachne in 2015
- Pancorius Simon, 1902
- Papuamyr Maddison & Szűts, 2019
- Papuaneon Maddison, 2016
- Parabathippus Zhang & Maddison, 2012
- Paradamoetas Peckham & Peckham, 1885
- Paraharmochirus Szombathy, 1915
- Paraheliophanus Clark & Benoit, 1977
- Parahelpis Gardzińska & Żabka, 2010
- Parajotus Peckham & Peckham, 1903
- Paramaevia Barnes, 1955, included in Maevia in 2015
- Paramarpissa F. O. Pickard-Cambridge, 1901
- Paraneaetha Denis, 1947
- Paraphidippus F. O. Pickard-Cambridge, 1901
- Paraphilaeus Żabka, 2003
- Paraplatoides Żabka, 1992
- Paraplexippus Franganillo, 1930
- Parasaitis Bryant, 1950
- Parnaenus Peckham & Peckham, 1896
- Parvattus Zhang & Maddison, 2012
- Peckhamia Simon, 1900
- Pelegrina Franganillo, 1930
- Pellenes Simon, 1876
- Pellolessertia Strand, 1929
- Penionomus Simon, 1903
- Pensacola Peckham & Peckham, 1885
- Pensacolops Bauab, 1983
- Peplometus Simon, 1900
- Petemathis Prószyński & Deeleman-Reinhold, 2012
- Phanias F. O. Pickard-Cambridge, 1901
- Phanuelus Caleb & Mathai, 2015
- Pharacocerus Simon, 1902
- Phasmolia Zhang & Maddison, 2012
- Phaulostylus Simon, 1902
- Phiale C. L. Koch, 1846
- Phidippus C. L. Koch, 1846
- Philaeus Thorell, 1869
- Philates Simon, 1900
- Philira Edwards, 2015
- Phintella Strand, 1906
- Phintelloides Kanesharatnam & Benjamin, 2019
- Phlegra Simon, 1876
- Phyaces Simon, 1902
- Pignus Wesołowska, 2000
- Piranthus Thorell, 1895
- Planiemen Wesołowska & van Harten, 2007
- Platycryptus Hill, 1979
- Platypsecas Caporiacco, 1955
- Plesiopiuka Ruiz, 2010
- Plexippoides Prószyński, 1984
- Plexippus C. L. Koch, 1846
- Pochyta Simon, 1901
- Pochytoides Wesołowska, 2020
- Poecilorchestes Simon, 1901
- Polemus Simon, 1902
- Popcornella Zhang & Maddison, 2012
- Porius Thorell, 1892
- Poultonella Peckham & Peckham, 1909
- Pristobaeus Simon, 1902
- Prostheclina Keyserling, 1882
- Proszynskia Kanesharatnam & Benjamin, 2019
- Proszynskiana Logunov, 1996
- Psecas C. L. Koch, 1850
- Psenuc Prószyński, 2016, separated from Pseudicius in 2016
- Pseudamycus Simon, 1885
- Pseudemathis Simon, 1902
- Pseudeuophrys Dahl, 1912
- Pseudicius Simon, 1885
- Pseudocorythalia Caporiacco, 1938
- Pseudofluda Mello-Leitão, 1928
- Pseudomogrus Simon, 1937, included in Yllenus in 2015
- Pseudopartona Caporiacco, 1954
- Pseudoplexippus Caporiacco, 1947
- Ptocasius Simon, 1885
- Pungalina Richardson, 2013
- Pystira Simon, 1901, included in Omoedus in 2015
- Rafalus Prószyński, 1999
- Ragatinus Dawidowicz & Wesołowska, 2016
- Rarahu Berland, 1929
- Rhene Thorell, 1869
- Rhetenor Simon, 1902
- Rhombonotus L. Koch, 1879
- Rhondes Simon, 1901
- Rhyphelia Simon, 1902
- Rishaschia Makhan, 2006
- Rogmocrypta Simon, 1900
- Rudakius Prószyński, 2016, separated from Pseudicius in 2016
- Rudra Peckham & Peckham, 1885
- Rumburak Wesołowska, Azarkina & Russell-Smith, 2014
- Saaristattus Logunov & Azarkina, 2008
- Sadies Wanless, 1984
- Saitidops Simon, 1901
- Saitis Simon, 1876
- Saitissus Roewer, 1938
- Salticus Latreille, 1804
- Sandalodes Keyserling, 1883
- Saphrys Zhang & Maddison, 2015
- Saraina Wanless & Clark, 1975
- Saratus Otto & Hill, 2017
- Sassacus Peckham & Peckham, 1895
- Schenkelia Lessert, 1927
- Sebastira Simon, 1901
- Selimus Peckham & Peckham, 1901
- Semnolius Simon, 1902
- Semora Peckham & Peckham, 1892
- Semorina Simon, 1901
- Servaea Simon, 1888
- Sibianor Logunov, 2001
- Sidusa Peckham & Peckham, 1895
- Sigytes Simon, 1902
- Siler Simon, 1889
- Simaetha Thorell, 1881
- Simaethula Simon, 1902
- Sobasina Simon, 1898
- Soesilarishius Makhan, 2007
- Sondra Wanless, 1988
- Spadera Peckham & Peckham, 1894, separated from Pseudicius in 2017
- Spilargis Simon, 1902
- Stagetillus Simon, 1885
- Stenaelurillus Simon, 1886, including Microheros Wesołowska & Cumming, 1999
- Stertinius Simon, 1890
- Stoidis Simon, 1901
- Sumampattus Galiano, 1983
- Synageles Simon, 1876
- Synagelides Strand, 1906
- Tacuna Peckham & Peckham, 1901
- Taivala Peckham & Peckham, 1907
- Talavera Peckham & Peckham, 1909
- Tanzania Koçak & Kemal, 2008
- Tapsatella Rubio & Stolar, 2020
- Tara Peckham & Peckham, 1886
- Tarkas Edwards, 2015
- Tarne Simon, 1886
- Tarodes Pocock, 1899
- Tasa Wesołowska, 1981, replacement name for Thianella Schenkel, 1963
- Tauala Wanless, 1988
- Telamonia Thorell, 1887
- Tenkana Marathe, Maddison & Caleb, 2024
- Terralonus Maddison, 1996
- Thammaca Simon, 1901
- Theriella Braul & Lise, 1996
- Thiania C. L. Koch, 1846
- Thianitara Simon, 1903, included in Thiania by Zhang & Maddison, 2015
- Thiratoscirtus Simon, 1886
- Thorelliola Strand, 1942
- Thyene Simon, 1885
- Thyenula Simon, 1902
- Tisaniba Zhang & Maddison, 2014
- Toxeus C. L. Koch, 1846, included in Myrmarachne in 2015
- Triggella Edwards, 2015
- Trite Simon, 1885
- Truncattus Zhang & Maddison, 2012
- Trydarssus Galiano, 1995
- Tullgrenella Mello-Leitão, 1941
- Tulpius Peckham & Peckham, 1896
- Tusitala Peckham & Peckham, 1902
- Tutelina Simon, 1901
- Tuvaphantes Logunov, 1993
- Tylogonus Simon, 1902
- Udvardya Prószyński, 1992
- Uluella Chickering, 1946
- Ureta Wesołowska & Haddad, 2013
- Uroballus Simon, 1902
- Urogelides Żabka, 2009
- Uxuma Simon, 1902
- Vailimia Kammerer, 2006
- Variratina Zhang & Maddison, 2012
- Viciria Thorell, 1877
- Viribestus Zhang & Maddison, 2012
- Viroqua Peckham & Peckham, 1901
- Wallaba Mello-Leitão, 1940, considered a synonym of Sidusa by Zhang & Maddison, 2015
- Wedoquella Galiano, 1984
- Wesolowskana Koçak & Kemal, 2008
- Xanthofreya Edwards, 2015
- Xenocytaea Berry, Beatty & Prószyński, 1998
- Xuriella Wesołowska & Russell-Smith, 2000
- Yacuitella Galiano, 1999
- Yaginumaella Prószyński, 1979
- Yepoella Galiano, 1970
- Yimbulunga Wesołowska, Azarkina & Russell-Smith, 2014
- Yllenus Simon, 1868
- Zabkattus Zhang & Maddison, 2012
- Zebraplatys Żabka, 1992
- Zenodorus Peckham & Peckham, 1886, included in Omoedus in 2015
- Zeuxippus Thorell, 1891, synonimized with Rhene in 2022
- Zygoballus Peckham & Peckham, 1885

=== Salticinae incertae sedis ===
- Adoxotoma Simon, 1909
- Albionella Chickering, 1946
- Ananeon Richardson, 2013
- Aruana Strand, 1911
- Bokokius Roewer, 1942
- Cavillator Wesołowska, 2000
- Epidelaxia Simon, 1902
- Flacillula Strand, 1932
- Gambaquezonia Barrion & Litsinger, 1995
- Ghumattus Prószyński, 1992
- Giuiria Strand, 1906
- Grayenulla Żabka, 1992
- Haplopsecas Caporiacco, 1955
- Hasarinella Wesołowska, 2012
- Heliophanoides Prószyński, 1992
- Hinewaia Żabka & Pollard, 2002
- Hisukattus Galiano, 1987
- Homalattus White, 1841
- Iberattus Prószyński, 2018, detailed placement uncertain
- Jajpurattus Prószyński, 1992
- Leuserattus Prószyński & Deeleman-Reinhold, 2012
- Ligdus Thorell, 1895
- Maddisonia Żabka, 2014
- Maltecora Simon, 1909
- Microhasarius Simon, 1902
- Muziris Simon, 1901
- Necatia Özdikmen, 2007
- Pachypoessa Simon, 1902
- Padillothorus Prószyński, 2018, separated from Stagetillus in 2018; detailed placement uncertain
- Panysinus Simon, 1901
- Phausina Simon, 1902
- Pilia Simon, 1902
- Poessa Simon, 1902
- Proszynellus Patoleta & Żabka, 2015
- Pseudomaevia Rainbow, 1920
- Pseudosynagelides Żabka, 1991
- Salpesia Simon, 1901
- Sarindoides Mello-Leitão, 1922
- Simaethulina Wesołowska, 2012
- Similaria Prószyński, 1992
- Stergusa Simon, 1889
- Tamigalesus Żabka, 1988
- Tatari Berland, 1938
- Thyenillus Simon, 1909
- Toticoryx Rollard & Wesołowska, 2002
- Udalmella Galiano, 1994
- Yogetor Wesołowska & Russell-Smith, 2000
- Zulunigma Wesołowska & Cumming, 2011

== Salticidae incertae sedis ==
- Ancepitilobus Richardson, 2016, taxonomic relationships unknown
- Arachnotermes Mello-Leitão, 1928
- Ballagascar Azarkina & Haddad, 2020
- Ballognatha Caporiacco, 1935, nomen dubium
- Capeyorkia Richardson, 2016, taxonomic relationships unknown
- Ceglusa Thorell, 1895
- Clynotoides Mello-Leitão, 1944
- Dolichoneon Caporiacco, 1935
- Dendroicius Lin & Li, 2020, taxonomic relationships not stated
- Hyctiota Strand, 1911
- Stenodeza Simon, 1900
- Thianella Strand, 1907, nomen dubium
- Vatovia Caporiacco, 1940
