= Drobinka =

Scientific classification
- Kingdom: Animalia
- Phylum: Arthropoda
- Subphylum: Chelicerata
- Class: Arachnida
- Order: Araneae
- Infraorder: Araneomorphae
- Family: Salticidae
- Genus: Drobinka; Wesołowska, 2021
- Species: D. parvula

Binomial name
- Drobinka parvula Wesołowska, 2021

Genus of jumping spiders

Drobinka is a monotypic genus of western African jumping spiders containing the single species, Drobinka parvula. It was first described by Wanda Wesołowska in 2021, and it has only been found in Nigeria. The species has three eye rows for both male and female.

== See also ==
- List of Salticidae genera
