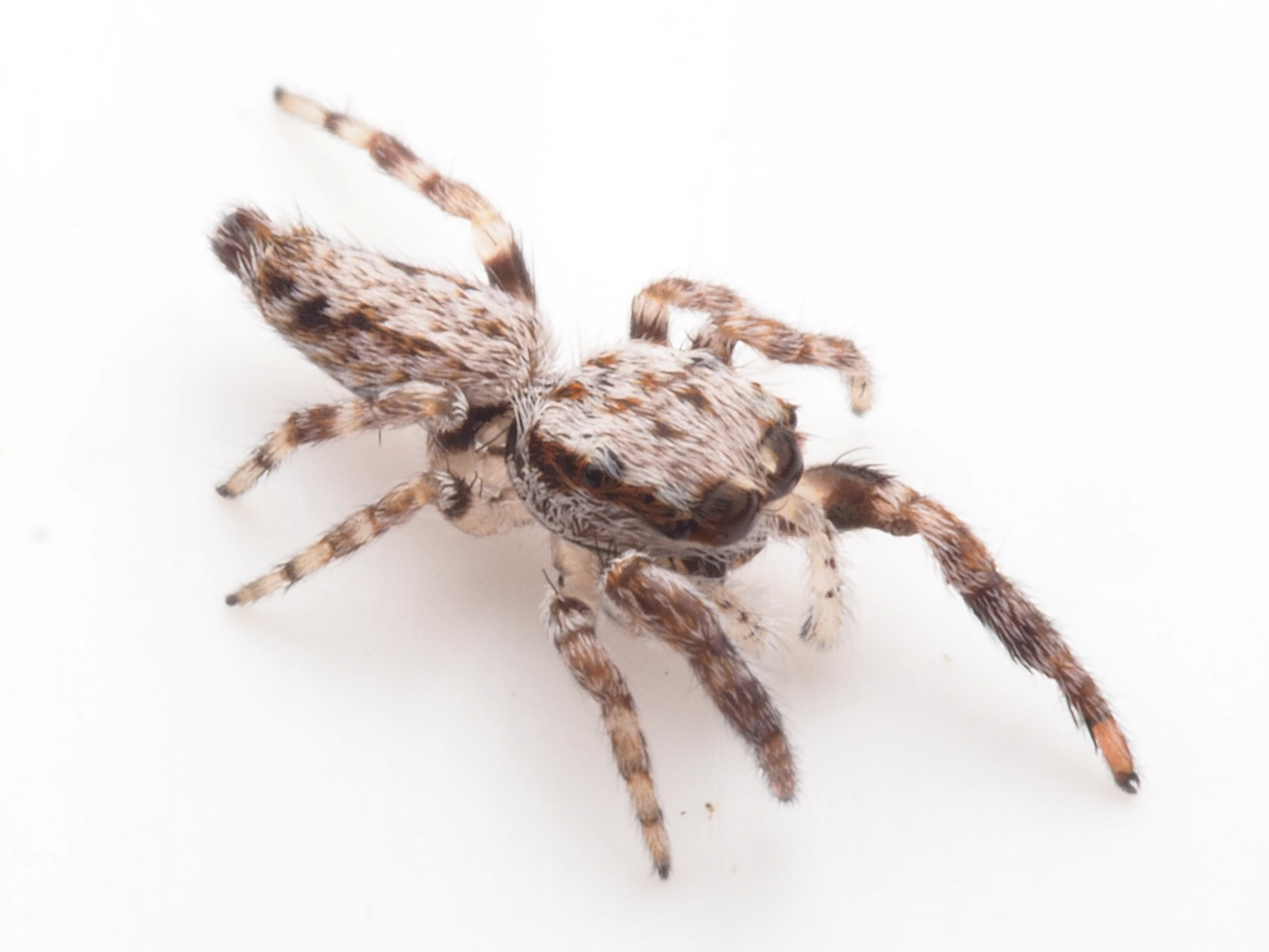

Scientific classification
- Kingdom: Animalia
- Phylum: Arthropoda
- Subphylum: Chelicerata
- Class: Arachnida
- Order: Araneae
- Infraorder: Araneomorphae
- Family: Salticidae
- Genus: Ananeon; Richardson, 2013
- Species: A. howardensis

Binomial name
- Ananeon howardensis Richardson, 2013

= Ananeon =

Genus of spiders

Ananeon is a monotypic genus of jumping spiders containing the single species, Ananeon howardensis. It was first described by B. J. Richardson in 2013, and is only found in the Northern Territory of Australia.
