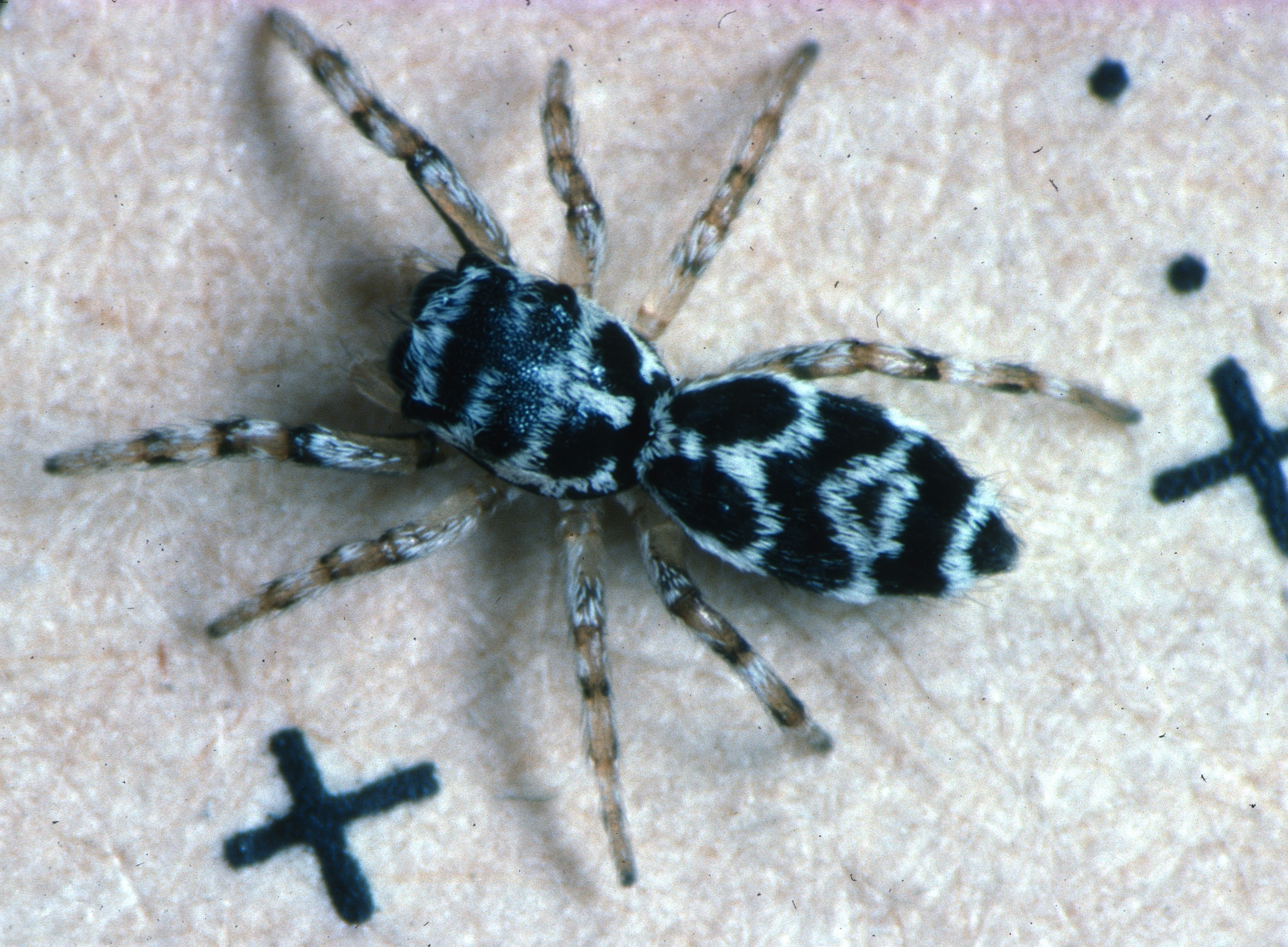
- Female Cyllodania sp.

Scientific classification
- Kingdom: Animalia
- Phylum: Arthropoda
- Subphylum: Chelicerata
- Class: Arachnida
- Order: Araneae
- Infraorder: Araneomorphae
- Family: Salticidae
- Subfamily: Salticinae
- Genus: Cyllodania; Simon, 1902

Type species
- C. bicruciata Simon, 1902

Species
- C. bicruciata Simon, 1902 – Panama, Venezuela; C. trinidad Bustamante & Ruiz, 2017 – Trinidad; C. zoobotanica Bustamante & Ruiz, 2017 – Brazil

= Cyllodania =

Genus of spiders

Cyllodania is a genus of jumping spiders that was first described by Eugène Louis Simon in 1902. As of June 2019 it contains only three species, found in Venezuela, Panama, Brazil, and on Trinidad: C. bicruciata, C. trinidad, and C. zoobotanica.
