= Myrmagua =

Scientific classification
- Kingdom: Animalia
- Phylum: Arthropoda
- Subphylum: Chelicerata
- Class: Arachnida
- Order: Araneae
- Infraorder: Araneomorphae
- Family: Salticidae
- Subfamily: Salticinae
- Genus: Myrmagua; Prószyński, 2016
- Species: M. guaranitica

Binomial name
- Myrmagua guaranitica (Galiano, 1969)

Genus of spiders

Myrmagua is a genus of spiders in the family Salticidae. It was first described in 2016 by Polish arachnologist Jerzy Prószyński. As of 2017, it contains only one species, Myrmagua guaranitica, found in Argentina.
