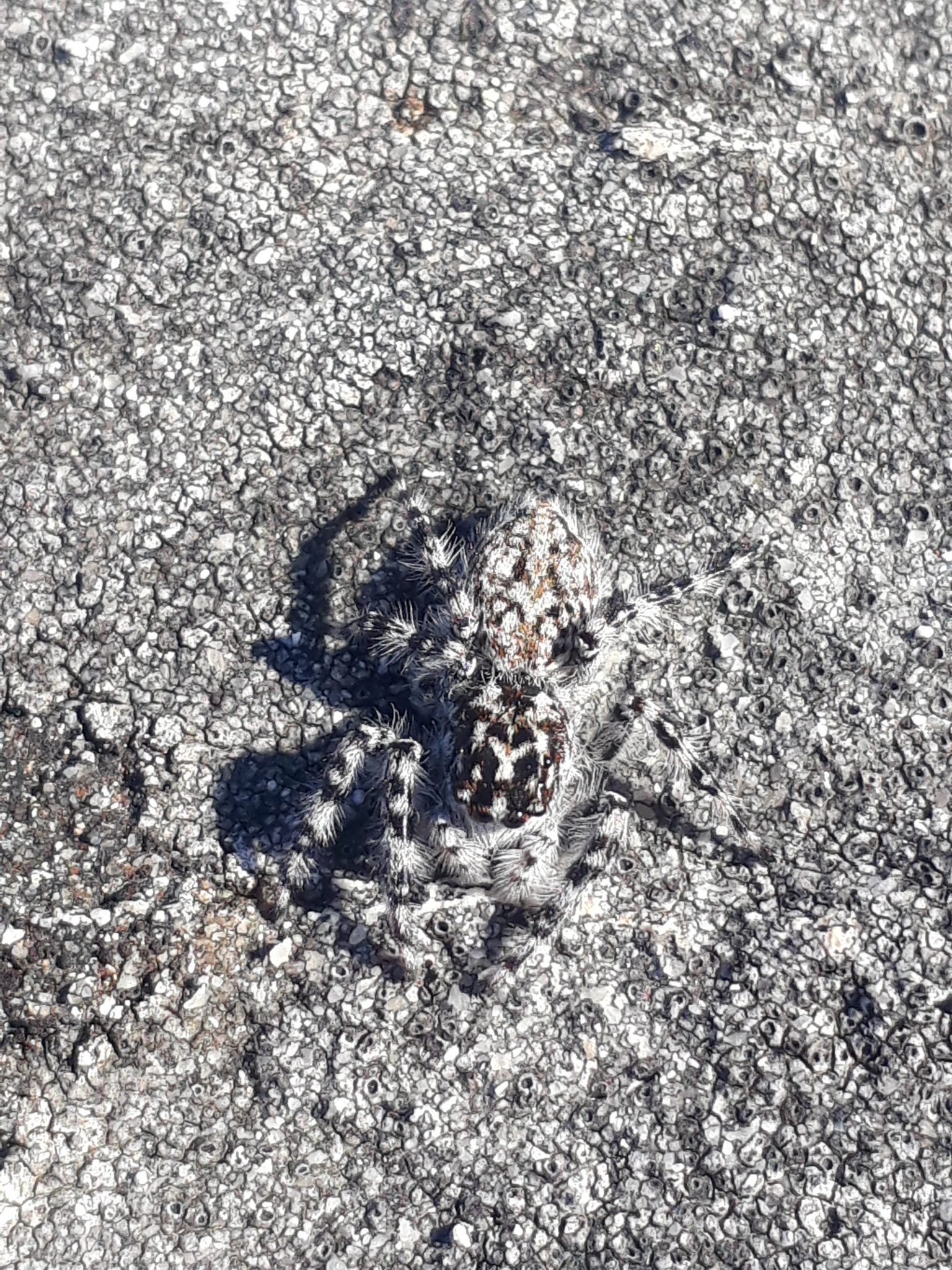
- O. petroides
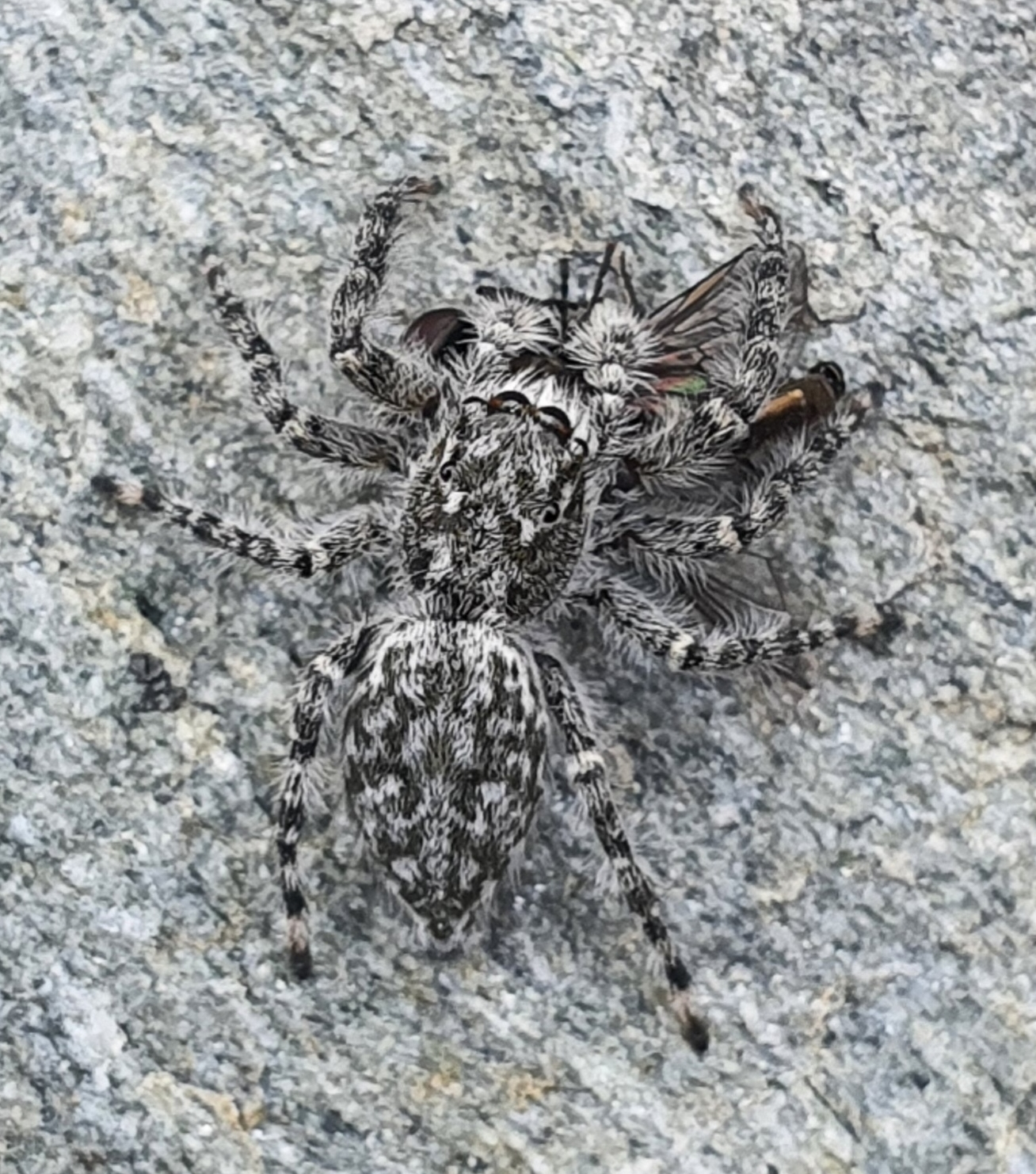
- O. otagoensis

Scientific classification
- Kingdom: Animalia
- Phylum: Arthropoda
- Subphylum: Chelicerata
- Class: Arachnida
- Order: Araneae
- Infraorder: Araneomorphae
- Family: Salticidae
- Genus: Ourea; Long, Vink & Paterson, 2025

Type species
- O. petroides Long, Vink & Paterson, 2025

Species
- 12, see text

= Ourea (spider) =

Genus of spiders

Ourea is a predominantly alpine genus of spiders in the family Salticidae found in New Zealand.

== Distribution ==
The genus Ourea is endemic to the South Island of New Zealand. Members of this genus are typically found in alpine regions although some species such as O. kohatu have been recorded at lower altitudes.

== Species ==
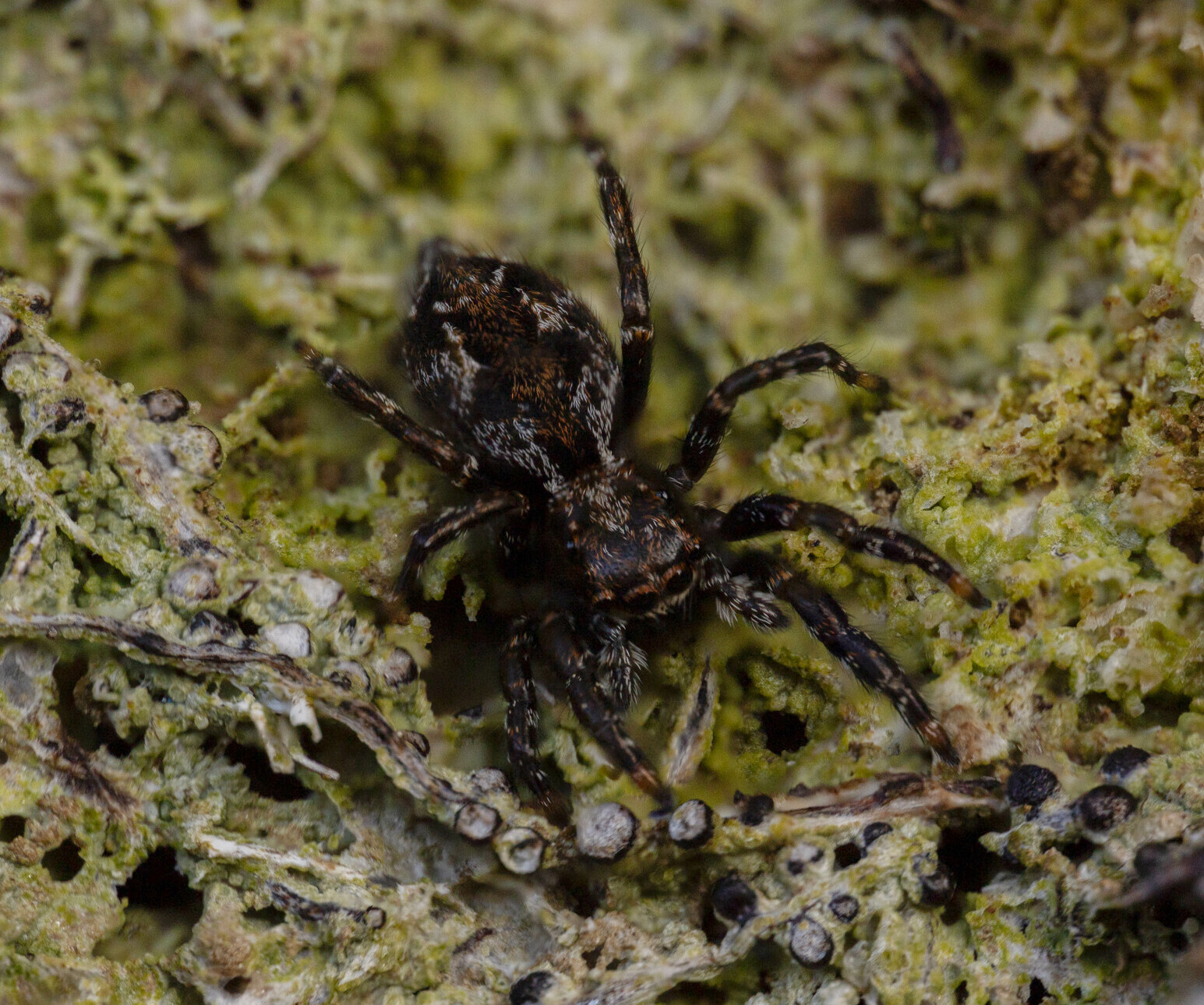
O. paparoa

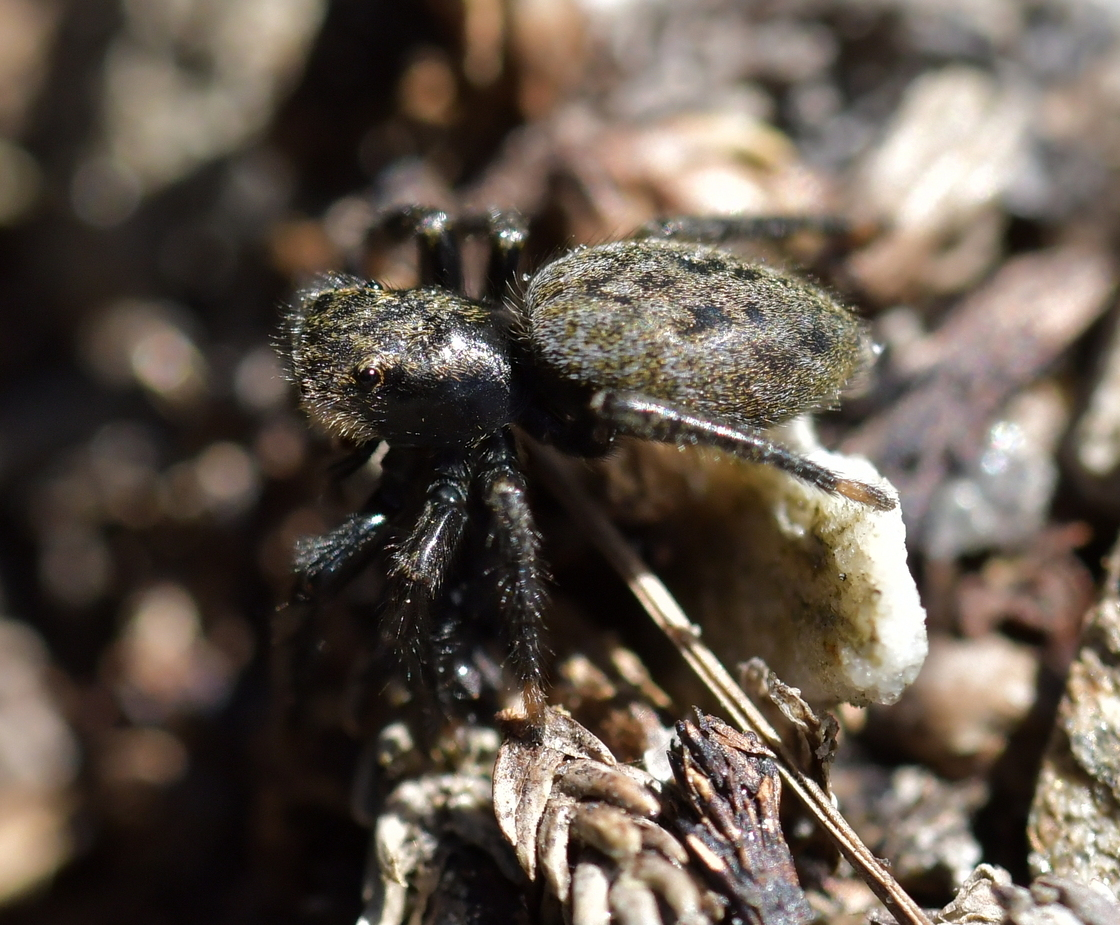
O. saffroclypeus

As of January 2026, this genus includes twelve species:

- Ourea alpinus Long, Vink & Paterson, 2025 – New Zealand
- Ourea cyanofemorus Long, Vink & Paterson, 2025 – New Zealand
- Ourea kohatu Long, Vink & Paterson, 2025 – New Zealand
- Ourea kowhai Long, Vink & Paterson, 2025 – New Zealand
- Ourea marmoratus Long, Vink & Paterson, 2025 – New Zealand
- Ourea mauka Long, Vink & Paterson, 2025 – New Zealand
- Ourea occidentalis Long, Vink & Paterson, 2025 – New Zealand
- Ourea otagoensis Long, Vink & Paterson, 2025 – New Zealand
- Ourea paparoa Long, Vink & Paterson, 2025 – New Zealand
- Ourea petroides Long, Vink & Paterson, 2025 – New Zealand
- Ourea saffroclypeus Long, Vink & Paterson, 2025 – New Zealand
- Ourea striatops Long, Vink & Paterson, 2025 – New Zealand

Other undescribed species from Fiordland, the Chatham Islands and several subantarctic island species in the genus Clynotis may also belong in Ourea.

== Etymology ==
The genus name references the concept from Greek mythology wherein each mountain has a unique deity, or ‘Ourea’. This choice of name also reflects the alpine range of this genus.
