= Tubalaxia =

Scientific classification
- Kingdom: Animalia
- Phylum: Arthropoda
- Subphylum: Chelicerata
- Class: Arachnida
- Order: Araneae
- Infraorder: Araneomorphae
- Family: Salticidae
- Genus: Tubalaxia; Satkunanathan & Benjamin, 2024

Type species
- T. aurea Satkunanathan & Benjamin, 2024

Species
- 3, see text

Genus of spiders

Tubalaxia is a genus of spiders in the family Salticidae.

== Distribution ==
Tubalaxia is found in India and Sri Lanka.

== Species ==
As of January 2026, this genus includes three species:

- Tubalaxia aurea Satkunanathan & Benjamin, 2024 – Sri Lanka
- Tubalaxia castanea Satkunanathan & Benjamin, 2024 – Sri Lanka
- Tubalaxia minuta (Prószyński, 1992) – India
