= Maddisonia =

Scientific classification
- Kingdom: Animalia
- Phylum: Arthropoda
- Subphylum: Chelicerata
- Class: Arachnida
- Order: Araneae
- Infraorder: Araneomorphae
- Family: Salticidae
- Subfamily: Salticinae
- Genus: Maddisonia; Zabka

Type species
- Maddisonia richardsoni

Species
- Maddisonia berbekai Zabka, 2014; Maddisonia richardsoni Zabka, 2014; Maddisonia whytei Zabka, 2014

Genus of spiders

Maddisonia is a genus of spiders in the family Salticidae. It was first described in 2014 by Zabka. As of 2017, it contains 3 Australian species.
