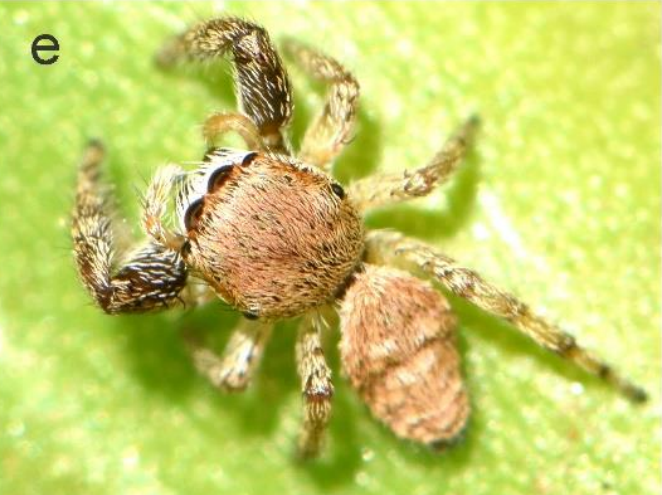
- female L. chacoensis in Argentina
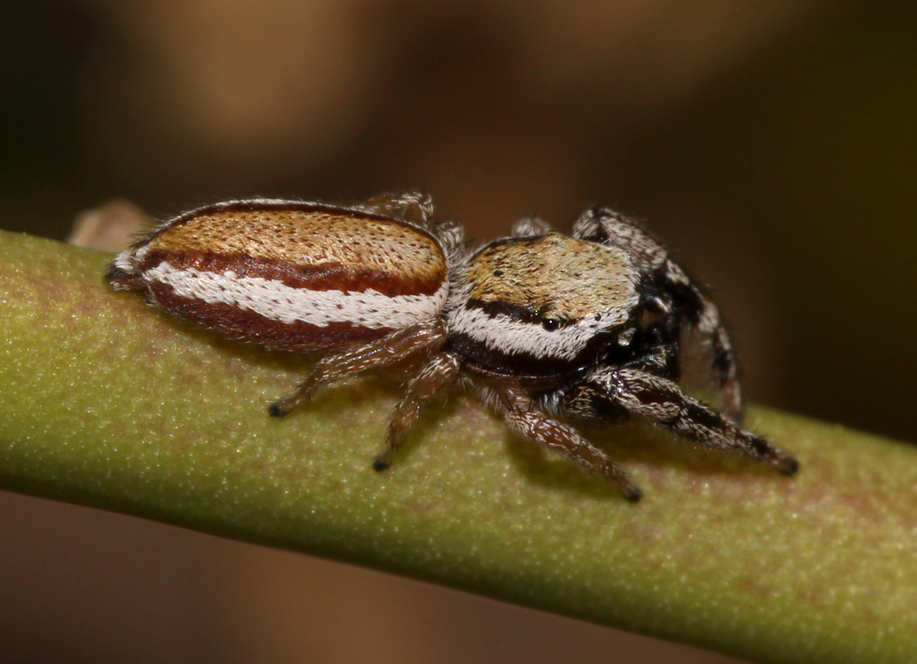
- male L. demagistrisi in Argentina

Scientific classification
- Kingdom: Animalia
- Phylum: Arthropoda
- Subphylum: Chelicerata
- Class: Arachnida
- Order: Araneae
- Infraorder: Araneomorphae
- Family: Salticidae
- Tribe: Dendryphantini
- Genus: Lumptibiella; Rubio, Baigorria & Stolar, 2022

Type species
- L. chacoensis Rubio, Baigorria & Stolar, 2022

Species
- 4, see text

= Lumptibiella =

Genus of spiders

Lumptibiella is a genus of spiders in the family Salticidae.

== Distribution ==
The genus Lumptibiella is endemic to Argentina.

== Etymology ==
The genus name indicates that the tibia in this genus have a lump. L. chacoensis refers to the Dry Chaco ecoregion of the type locality. L. paranensis was found in the Upper Paraná Atlantic Forest. "camporum" refers to L. camporum living in grassland fields. L. demagistris honors biologist Alberto Antonio De Magistris.

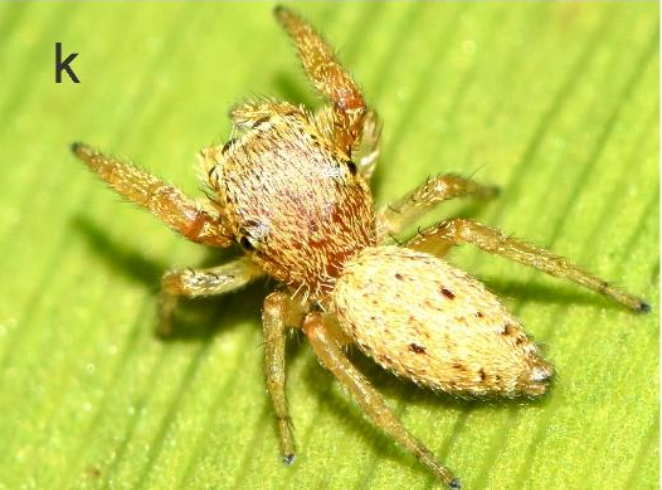
female L. camporum

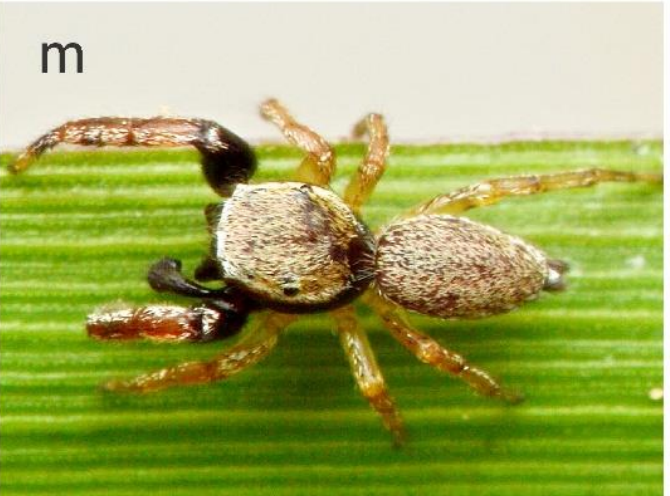
male L. camporum

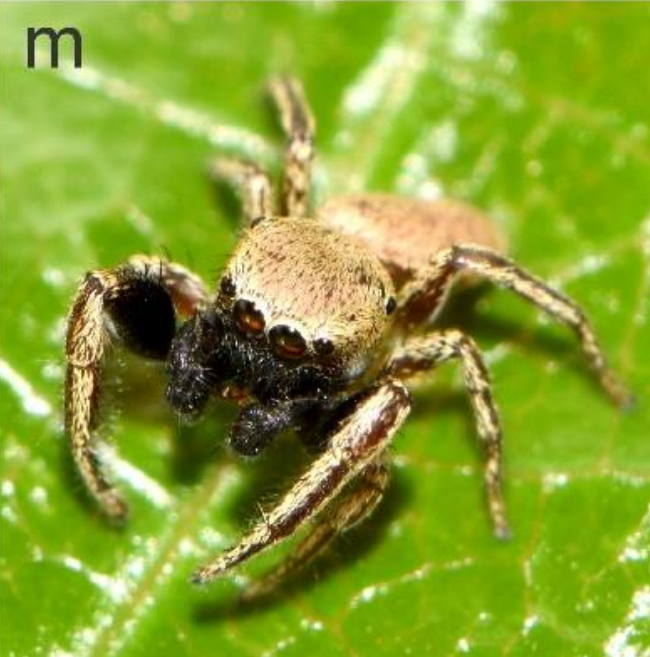
male L. chacoensis

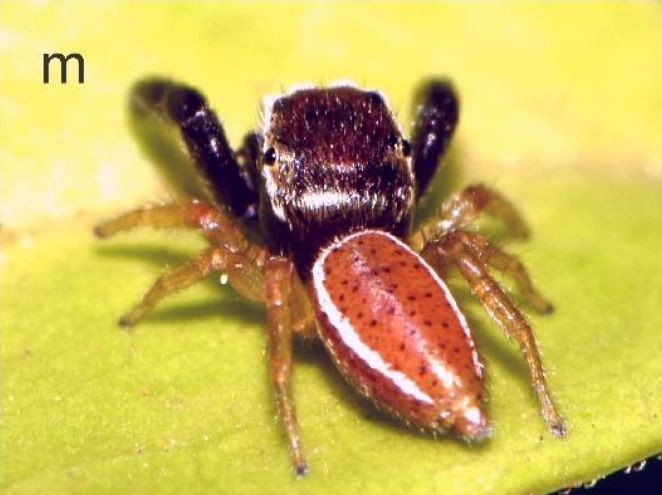
male L. paranensis

== Species ==
As of January 2026, this genus includes four species:

- Lumptibiella camporum Rubio, Baigorria & Stolar, 2022 – Argentina
- Lumptibiella chacoensis Rubio, Baigorria & Stolar, 2022 – Argentina
- Lumptibiella demagistrisi Rubio, Baigorria & Stolar, 2023 – Argentina
- Lumptibiella paranensis Rubio, Baigorria & Stolar, 2022 – Argentina
