= Myrmanu =

Scientific classification
- Kingdom: Animalia
- Phylum: Arthropoda
- Subphylum: Chelicerata
- Class: Arachnida
- Order: Araneae
- Infraorder: Araneomorphae
- Family: Salticidae
- Subfamily: Salticinae
- Genus: Myrmanu; Prószyński, 2016

Type species
- Myrmanu nubilis

Species
- Myrmanu mahasoa (Wanless, 1978); Myrmanu nubilis (Wanless, 1978)

Genus of spiders

Myrmanu is a genus of spiders in the family Salticidae. It was first described in 2016 by Prószyński. As of 2017, it contains 2 species from Madagascar.
