= Haplopsecas =

Scientific classification
- Kingdom: Animalia
- Phylum: Arthropoda
- Subphylum: Chelicerata
- Class: Arachnida
- Order: Araneae
- Infraorder: Araneomorphae
- Family: Salticidae
- Genus: Haplopsecas
- Species: H. annulipes

Binomial name
- Haplopsecas annulipes Caporiacco, 1955

Genus of spiders

Haplopsecas is a genus of jumping spiders with a single described species, Haplopsecas annulipes. It is found in Venezuela.
