= Gypogyna =

Scientific classification
- Kingdom: Animalia
- Phylum: Arthropoda
- Subphylum: Chelicerata
- Class: Arachnida
- Order: Araneae
- Infraorder: Araneomorphae
- Family: Salticidae
- Genus: Gypogyna; Simon, 1900
- Species: G. forceps

Binomial name
- Gypogyna forceps Simon, 1900

Genus of spiders

Gypogyna is a genus of jumping spiders that occurs in Colombia, Brazil, Paraguay, and Argentina. Its only species is Gypogyna forceps.
