= Sphericula =

Scientific classification
- Kingdom: Animalia
- Phylum: Arthropoda
- Subphylum: Chelicerata
- Class: Arachnida
- Order: Araneae
- Infraorder: Araneomorphae
- Family: Salticidae
- Genus: Sphericula; Wesołowska & Russell-Smith, 2022
- Species: S. globulifera

Binomial name
- Sphericula globulifera Wesołowska & Russell-Smith, 2022

Species of spider

Sphericula is a monotypic genus of spiders in the family Salticidae containing the single species, Sphericula globulifera.

== Distribution ==
Sphericula globulifera is endemic to Lamto on the Ivory Coast.

== Etymology ==
The genus and species name (from Latin sphera "ball" and globulifera "ball-carrying") refer to the species' roundish abdomen.
