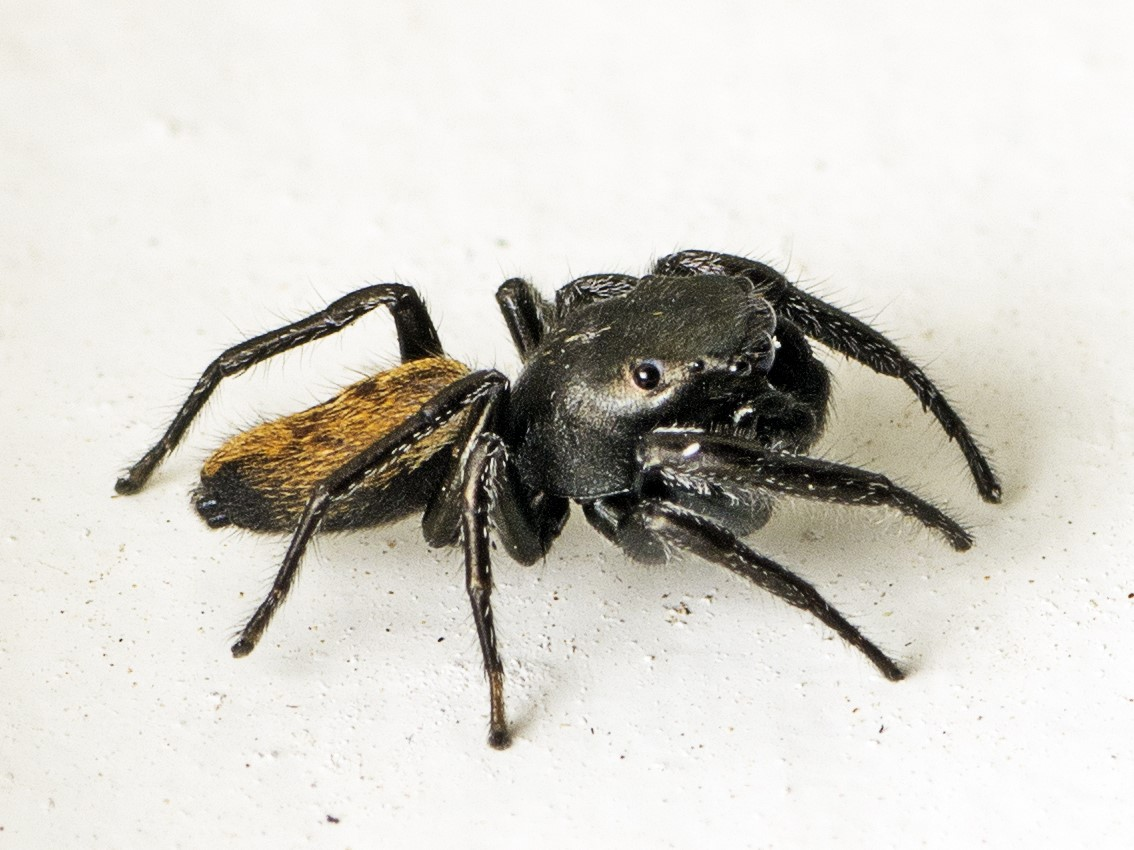
- Pungalina semiferruginea

Scientific classification
- Kingdom: Animalia
- Phylum: Arthropoda
- Subphylum: Chelicerata
- Class: Arachnida
- Order: Araneae
- Infraorder: Araneomorphae
- Family: Salticidae
- Subfamily: Salticinae
- Genus: Pungalina; Richardson, 2013

Type species
- P. weiri Richardson, 2013

Species
- 6, see text

= Pungalina (spider) =

Genus of spiders

Pungalina is a genus of Australian jumping spiders that was first described by Barry J. Richardson in 2013.

== Species ==
As of August 2019 it contains six species, found in the Northern Territory, Western Australia, Victoria, New South Wales, and Queensland:

- Pungalina albobarbata (L. Koch, 1879) – Australia (Queensland, New South Wales)
- Pungalina plurilineata Richardson, 2016 – Australia (Queensland, New South Wales, Victoria)
- Pungalina semiatra (L. Koch, 1879) – Australia (Queensland, New South Wales)
- Pungalina semiferruginea (L. Koch, 1879) – Australia (Queensland, New South Wales)
- Pungalina waldockae Richardson, 2016 – Australia (Western Australia)
- Pungalina weiri Richardson, 2013 (type) – Australia (Northern Territory)
