= Myrmatheca =

Scientific classification
- Kingdom: Animalia
- Phylum: Arthropoda
- Subphylum: Chelicerata
- Class: Arachnida
- Order: Araneae
- Infraorder: Araneomorphae
- Family: Salticidae
- Subfamily: Salticinae
- Genus: Myrmatheca; Prószyński, 2016
- Species: M. alticephalon

Binomial name
- Myrmatheca alticephalon (Yamasaki & Ahmad, 2013)

Genus of spiders

Myrmatheca is a genus of spiders in the family Salticidae. It was first described in 2016 by Prószyński. As of 2017, it contains only one species, Myrmatheca alticephalon, found in Sumatra and Borneo.
