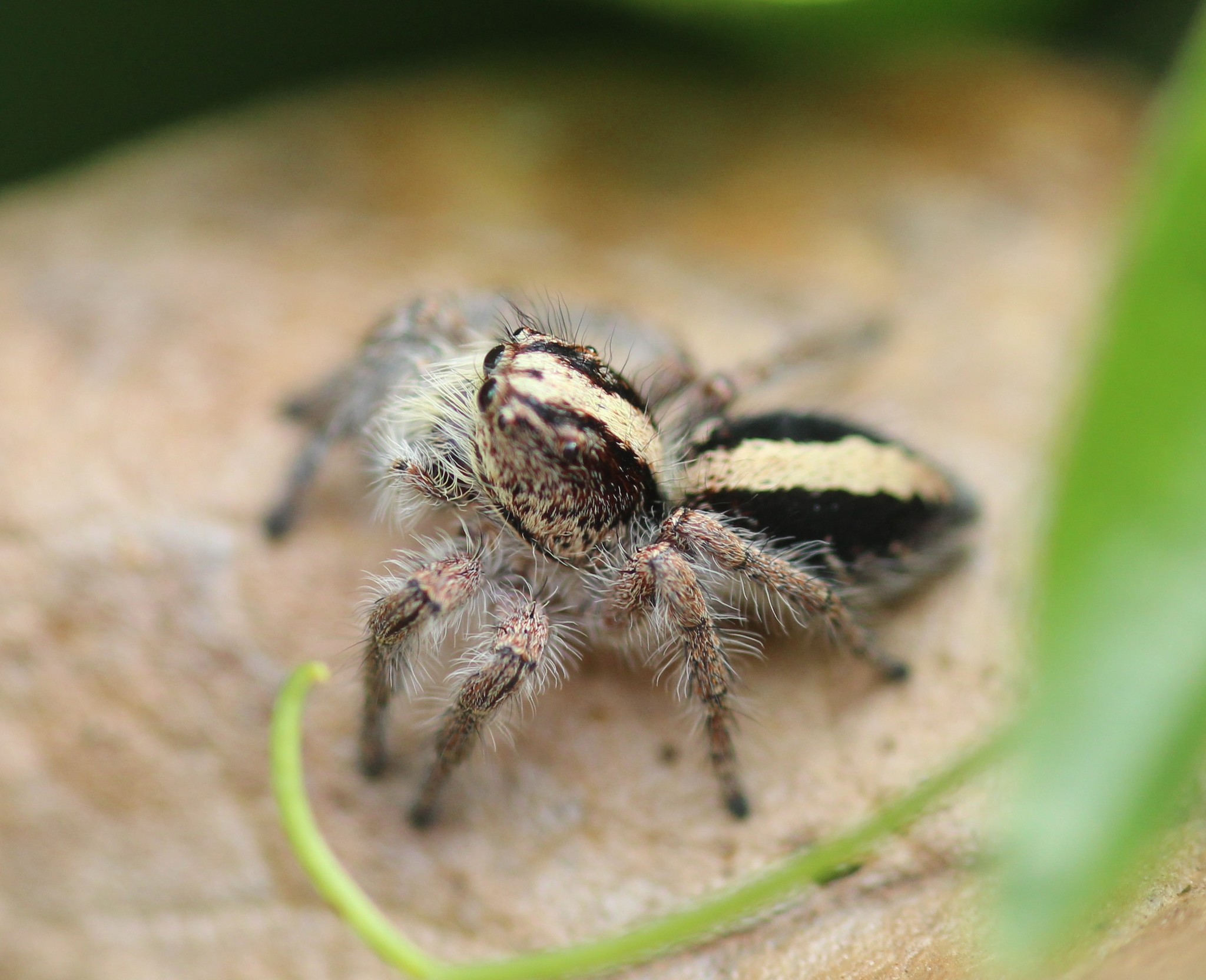

Scientific classification
- Kingdom: Animalia
- Phylum: Arthropoda
- Subphylum: Chelicerata
- Class: Arachnida
- Order: Araneae
- Infraorder: Araneomorphae
- Family: Salticidae
- Genus: Megafreya; Edwards, 2015
- Species: M. sutrix

Binomial name
- Megafreya sutrix (Holmberg, 1875)

= Megafreya =

Genus of spiders

Megafreya is a genus of spiders in the family Salticidae. As of 2017, it contains only one species, Megafreya sutrix which is native to Paraguay, Uruguay, and Argentina, and introduced to Java.
