= Hasarina =

Scientific classification
- Kingdom: Animalia
- Phylum: Arthropoda
- Subphylum: Chelicerata
- Class: Arachnida
- Order: Araneae
- Infraorder: Araneomorphae
- Family: Salticidae
- Genus: Hasarina
- Species: H. contortospinosa

Binomial name
- Hasarina contortospinosa Schenkel, 1963

Genus of spiders

Hasarina is a genus of jumping spiders with a single described species, Hasarina contortospinosa. It is found in China.
