= Bokokius =

Scientific classification
- Kingdom: Animalia
- Phylum: Arthropoda
- Subphylum: Chelicerata
- Class: Arachnida
- Order: Araneae
- Infraorder: Araneomorphae
- Family: Salticidae
- Genus: Bokokius; Roewer, 1942
- Species: B. penicillatus

Binomial name
- Bokokius penicillatus Roewer, 1942

Genus of spiders

Bokokius is a monotypic genus of jumping spiders containing the single species, Bokokius penicillatus. It was first described by Carl Friedrich Roewer in 1942, and is only found on Bioko.
