= Qiongattus =

Scientific classification
- Kingdom: Animalia
- Phylum: Arthropoda
- Subphylum: Chelicerata
- Class: Arachnida
- Order: Araneae
- Infraorder: Araneomorphae
- Family: Salticidae
- Genus: Qiongattus; Wang & Li, 2023
- Species: Q. yuanyeae

Binomial name
- Qiongattus yuanyeae Wang & Li, 2023

Species of spider

Qiongattus is a monotypic genus of spiders in the family Salticidae containing the single species, Qiongattus yuanyeae.

== Distribution ==
Qiongattus yuanyeae is endemic to China (Hainan).

== Etymology ==
The genus name is a combination of 瓊; Qióng (the short name for Hainan), and the common ending for salticid genera, "-attus". The species is named after its collector, Yuanye Zhou.
