= Capeyorkia =

Scientific classification
- Kingdom: Animalia
- Phylum: Arthropoda
- Subphylum: Chelicerata
- Class: Arachnida
- Order: Araneae
- Infraorder: Araneomorphae
- Family: Salticidae
- Subfamily: incertae sedis
- Genus: Capeyorkia
- Species: C. vulpecula

Binomial name
- Capeyorkia vulpecula (Thorell, 1881)

Genus of spiders

Capeyorkia is a genus of spiders in the family Salticidae. It was first described in 2016 by Richardson. As of 2017, it contains only one species, Capeyorkia vulpecula, found in Queensland. Its taxonomic relationships within the family are unknown.
