= Dianattus =

Scientific classification
- Kingdom: Animalia
- Phylum: Arthropoda
- Subphylum: Chelicerata
- Class: Arachnida
- Order: Araneae
- Infraorder: Araneomorphae
- Family: Salticidae
- Genus: Dianattus; C. Wang, Mi & Li, 2025
- Species: D. proszynskii

Binomial name
- Dianattus proszynskii C. Wang, Mi & Li, 2025

Species of spider

Dianattus is a monotypic genus of spiders in the family Salticidae containing the single species, Dianattus proszynskii.

== Distribution ==
Dianattus proszynskii is endemic to Yunnan, China.

== Etymology ==
The genus name is a combination of "Dian" (滇; Diān), the abbrevetiation for Yunnan, and the common salticid genus ending "-attus". The species is named after arachnologist Jerzy Prószyński.
