= Diplocanthopoda =

Scientific classification
- Kingdom: Animalia
- Phylum: Arthropoda
- Subphylum: Chelicerata
- Class: Arachnida
- Order: Araneae
- Infraorder: Araneomorphae
- Family: Salticidae
- Subfamily: Salticinae
- Genus: Diplocanthopoda; Abraham, 1925

Type species
- D. marina Abraham, 1925

Species
- D. hatamensis (Thorell, 1881) – Malaysia, New Guinea; D. marina Abraham, 1925 – Malaysia

Genus of spiders

Diplocanthopoda is a genus of jumping spiders that was first described by H. C. Abraham in 1925. As of June 2019 it contains only two species, found only in Malaysia and Papua New Guinea: D. hatamensis and D. marina.
