= Myrmapeni =

Scientific classification
- Kingdom: Animalia
- Phylum: Arthropoda
- Subphylum: Chelicerata
- Class: Arachnida
- Order: Araneae
- Infraorder: Araneomorphae
- Family: Salticidae
- Subfamily: Salticinae
- Genus: Myrmapeni; Prószyński, 2016

Type species
- Myrmapeni penicillata

Species
- 6, see text

Genus of spiders

Myrmapeni is a genus of spiders in the family Salticidae. It was first described in 2016 by Prószyński. As of 2017, it contains 6 widely dispersed species.

== Species ==
Myrmapeni comprises the following species:

- Myrmapeni borneensis (Peckham & Peckham, 1907)
- Myrmapeni chickeringi (Galiano, 1969)
- Myrmapeni diegoensis (Wanless, 1978)
- Myrmapeni penicillata (Mello-Leitão, 1933)
- Myrmapeni simplexella (Roewer, 1951)
- Myrmapeni sumana (Galiano, 1974)
