= Simaethulina =

Scientific classification
- Kingdom: Animalia
- Phylum: Arthropoda
- Subphylum: Chelicerata
- Class: Arachnida
- Order: Araneae
- Infraorder: Araneomorphae
- Family: Salticidae
- Genus: Simaethulina; Wesolowska, 2012
- Species: S. castanea

Binomial name
- Simaethulina castanea (Lessert, 1927)

Genus of spiders

Simaethulina is a monotypic genus of Congolese jumping spiders containing the single species, Simaethulina castanea. It was first described by Wanda Wesołowska in 2012, and is found only in the Congo.
