= Drizztius =

Scientific classification
- Kingdom: Animalia
- Phylum: Arthropoda
- Subphylum: Chelicerata
- Class: Arachnida
- Order: Araneae
- Infraorder: Araneomorphae
- Family: Salticidae
- Subfamily: Salticinae
- Genus: Drizztius; Edwards

Type species
- Drizztius geminensis

Species
- Drizztius geminensis Edwards, 2015 - Trinidad; Drizztius rufithorax (Simon, 1902) - Peru

Genus of spiders

Drizztius is a genus of spiders in the family Salticidae. It was first described in 2015 by Edwards. As of 2017, it contains 2 species.
