= Hyctiota =

Scientific classification
- Kingdom: Animalia
- Phylum: Arthropoda
- Subphylum: Chelicerata
- Class: Arachnida
- Order: Araneae
- Infraorder: Araneomorphae
- Family: Salticidae
- Subfamily: incertae sedis
- Genus: Hyctiota; Strand, 1911
- Species: H. banda

Binomial name
- Hyctiota banda Strand, 1911

Genus of spiders

Hyctiota is a genus of the jumping spiders found on the Moluccas in Indonesia. It is only described species is Hyctiota banda. Its taxonomic relationships within the family Salticidae are uncertain.
