= Amoenema =

Scientific classification
- Kingdom: Animalia
- Phylum: Arthropoda
- Subphylum: Chelicerata
- Class: Arachnida
- Order: Araneae
- Infraorder: Araneomorphae
- Family: Salticidae
- Genus: Amoenema; Yu & Zhang, 2023

Type species
- A. erhai Yu & Zhang, 2023

Species
- 4, see text

Genus of spiders

Amoenema is a genus of spiders in the family Salticidae.

== Distribution ==
Amoenema is endemic to China.

== Etymology ==
The genus name is from Latin "amoena" (wonderful), referring to the authors' passion for jumping spiders.

== Species ==
As of January 2026, this genus includes four species:

- Amoenema erhai Yu & Zhang, 2023 – China
- Amoenema liuae Yu & Zhang, 2023 – China
- Amoenema robusta (Lei & Peng, 2012) – China
- Amoenema zizhongi Yu & Zhang, 2023 – China
