= Calxattus =

Scientific classification
- Kingdom: Animalia
- Phylum: Arthropoda
- Subphylum: Chelicerata
- Class: Arachnida
- Order: Araneae
- Infraorder: Araneomorphae
- Family: Salticidae
- Tribe: Spartaeini
- Genus: Calxattus; Wang, Yu & Zhang, 2023

Type species
- Spartaeus serratus Yang, Liu, Liu & Peng, 2017

Species
- 2, see text

Genus of spiders

Calxattus is a genus of spiders in the family Salticidae.

== Distribution ==
Calxattus is endemic to China.

== Etymology ==
The genus name is a combination of Latin calx "limestone" and the typical salticid genus ending "-attus", referring to the karst rock surface habitat where the genus is found.

== Species ==
As of January 2026, this genus includes two species:

- Calxattus dengba Ni, Yu & Zhang, 2025 – China
- Calxattus serratus (Yang, W. Liu, P. Liu & Peng, 2017) – China
