= Myrmapana =

Scientific classification
- Kingdom: Animalia
- Phylum: Arthropoda
- Subphylum: Chelicerata
- Class: Arachnida
- Order: Araneae
- Infraorder: Araneomorphae
- Family: Salticidae
- Subfamily: Salticinae
- Genus: Myrmapana; Prószyński, 2016

Type species
- Myrmapana panamensis

Species
- Myrmapana brasiliensis (Mello-Leitão, 1922); Myrmapana centralis (Peckham & Peckham, 1892); Myrmapana mocamboensis (Galiano, 1974); Myrmapana panamensis (Galiano, 1969); Myrmapana parallela (Fabricius, 1798)

Genus of spiders

Myrmapana is a genus of spiders in the family Salticidae. It was first described in 2016 by Prószyński. As of 2017, it contains 5 species, found in the Americas from Mexico to Brazil.
