= Giuiria =

Scientific classification
- Kingdom: Animalia
- Phylum: Arthropoda
- Subphylum: Chelicerata
- Class: Arachnida
- Order: Araneae
- Infraorder: Araneomorphae
- Family: Salticidae
- Genus: Giuiria; Strand, 1906
- Species: G. unica

Binomial name
- Giuiria unica Strand, 1906

Genus of spiders

Giuiria is a monotypic genus of Ethiopian jumping spiders containing the single species, Giuiria unica. It was first described by Embrik Strand in 1906, and is only found in Ethiopia.

As of 2026, it is considered a nomen dubium.
