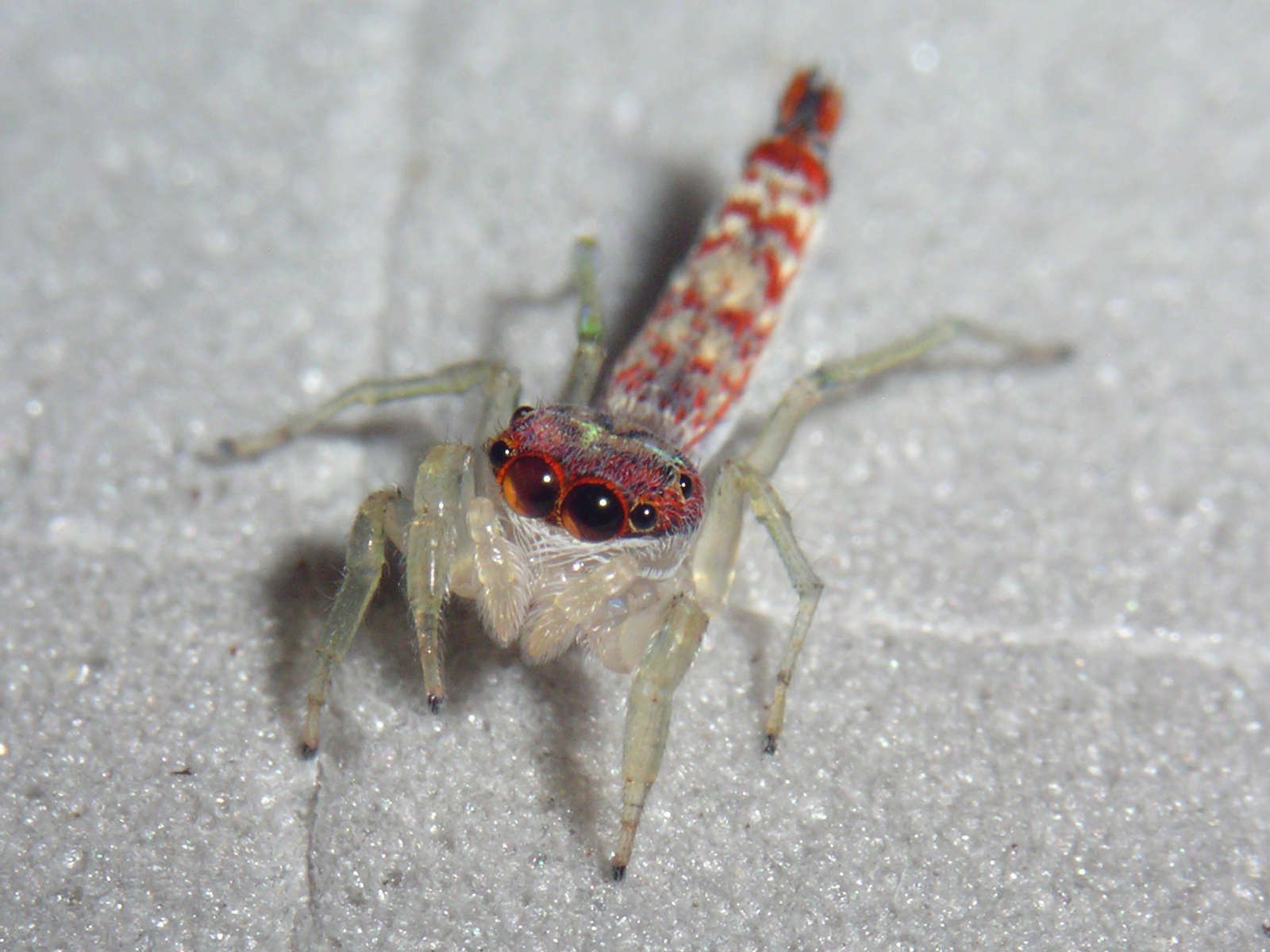
- Female Ceriomura sp.

Scientific classification
- Kingdom: Animalia
- Phylum: Arthropoda
- Subphylum: Chelicerata
- Class: Arachnida
- Order: Araneae
- Infraorder: Araneomorphae
- Family: Salticidae
- Subfamily: Salticinae
- Genus: Ceriomura; Simon, 1901

Type species
- C. cruenta (Peckham & Peckham, 1894)

Species
- 4, see text

= Ceriomura =

Genus of spiders

Ceriomura is a genus of South American jumping spiders that was first described by Eugène Louis Simon in 1901.

== Species ==
As of June 2019 it contains four species, found in Peru, Argentina, Brazil, and Colombia:

- Ceriomura casanare Galvis, 2017 – Colombia
- Ceriomura cruenta (Peckham & Peckham, 1894) (type) – Brazil
- Ceriomura damborskyae Rubio & Baigorria, 2016 – Argentina
- Ceriomura perita (Peckham & Peckham, 1894) – Peru
