= Urupuyu =

Scientific classification
- Kingdom: Animalia
- Phylum: Arthropoda
- Subphylum: Chelicerata
- Class: Arachnida
- Order: Araneae
- Infraorder: Araneomorphae
- Family: Salticidae
- Subfamily: Salticinae
- Genus: Urupuyu; Ruiz & Maddison, 2015

Type species
- Urupuyu antisana

Species
- Urupuyu antisana Ruiz & Maddison, 2015; Urupuyu edwardsi Ruiz & Maddison, 2015; Urupuyu occidentale Ruiz & Maddison, 2015

Genus of spiders

Urupuyu is a genus of spiders in the family Salticidae. It was first described in 2015 by Ruiz & Maddison. As of 2017, it contains 3 species, all from Ecuador.
