= Thyenillus =

Scientific classification
- Kingdom: Animalia
- Phylum: Arthropoda
- Subphylum: Chelicerata
- Class: Arachnida
- Order: Araneae
- Infraorder: Araneomorphae
- Family: Salticidae
- Genus: Thyenillus; Simon, 1910
- Species: T. fernandensis

Binomial name
- Thyenillus fernandensis Simon, 1910

Genus of spiders

Thyenillus is a monotypic genus of jumping spiders containing the single species, Thyenillus fernandensis. It was first described by Eugène Louis Simon in 1910, and is found only on Bioko.
