= Vallvonas =

Scientific classification
- Kingdom: Animalia
- Phylum: Arthropoda
- Subphylum: Chelicerata
- Class: Arachnida
- Order: Araneae
- Infraorder: Araneomorphae
- Family: Salticidae
- Genus: Vallvonas; Szűts, Zhang, Gallé-Szpisjak & De Bakker, 2020
- Species: V. zarandi

Binomial name
- Vallvonas zarandi Szűts, Zhang, Gallé-Szpisjak & De Bakker, 2020

Species of spider

Vallvonas is a monotypic genus of spiders in the family Salticidae containing the single species, Vallvonas zarandi.

== Distribution ==
Vallvonas zarandi is endemic to Papua New Guinea.

== Etymology ==
The etymology of the genus name is not explained by the original authors. The species is named after son, Zaránd Bence Szűts.
