= Mendoza dersuuzalai =

Scientific classification
- Kingdom: Animalia
- Phylum: Arthropoda
- Subphylum: Chelicerata
- Class: Arachnida
- Order: Araneae
- Infraorder: Araneomorphae
- Family: Salticidae
- Genus: Mendoza
- Species: M. dersuuzalai

Binomial name
- Mendoza dersuuzalai (Logunov & Wesołowska, 1992)

Species of jumping spider

Mendoza dersuuzalai is a jumping spider species that lives in Russia. It is found in meadows and woods of aspen and larch trees. The male was first described in 1992. It is a yellow medium-sized spider, typically with a cephalothorax that measures between 2.53 and 3.02 mm (0.100 and 0.119 in) and an abdomen that is between 2.88 and 3.02 mm (0.113 and 0.119 in) long. The male is black on its top surfaces with a pattern of white spots on its abdomen. The female is brown with a white streak on its abdomen. The bottom surfaces of the male are dark brown and of the female are yellow. The male has brown legs, the female having yellow legs. The spider's copulatory organs are similar to other species in the genus but differ in specific details, including the shape of the male's tibial apophysis and the length of the female's insemination ducts. The species was originally allocated to the genus Marpissa, but was transferred to Mendoza in 1999.

== Taxonomy and etymology ==
Mendoza dersuuzalai is a species of jumping spider, a member of the family Salticidae, that was first described by the arachnologist Dmitri Logunov and Wanda Wesołowska in 1992. He initially allocated it to the genus Marpissa, first circumscribed by Carl Ludwig Koch in 1846. In 1999, Logunov published a work with that reassessed the genus along with the related genera Hyctia and Mendoza. In this, he moved all four species to Mendoza, which had been circumscribed by George and Elizabeth Peckham in 1894, and created a new combination of Mendoza dersuuzalai. Along with Marpissa, Mendoza is a member of the subtribe Marpissina in the tribe Dendryphantini. In 2017, Jerzy Prószyński placed the genus in a group named Hyllines, named after the genus Hyllus, with 39 other genera. The specific name recalls Dersu Uzala, mentioned by the author Vladimir Arsenyev, who is supposed to have died near the place where the species was first found.

== Description ==
Mendoza spiders are medium-sized with the male and female being of similar size. The male Mendoza dersuuzalai has a cephalothorax that is between 2.53 and 2.88 mm (0.100 and 0.113 in) long, 1.8 and 2.05 mm (0.071 and 0.081 in) wide and 0.85 and 1.03 mm (0.033 and 0.041 in) high. Its carapace, the hard upper side of its cephalothorax, is dark brown and covered in a few thin dark hairs. Its eye field is darker, nearly black, and has many small dents in its surface. There are five white spots formed of hairs behind the eye field and a white band along the back of the carapace. There are a few small hairs near the spider's eyes. The underside of the cephalothorax, called the sternum, is also dark brown, as are the chelicerae, labium and maxillae. There are light edges on the side of the labium and maxillae and two teeth at the front of the chelicerae and one tooth at the rear.

The male spider's abdomen is between 2.88 and 3.45 mm (0.136 in) long and between 1.45 and 1.7 mm (0.057 and 0.067 in) wide. The black upper surface has a bright golden sheen and a covering of thin dark hairs, the density of the hairs increasing towards the front. It has a pattern of eight white spots each surrounded by black rings. The lower surface of the abdomen is dark but not black and has a pattern of lighter lines, two running from the front to the back and others formed of two rows made up of points. The spider has dark spinnerets to spin webs and brown legs. The front pair of legs are thicker than the others. All the legs have many thin dark hairs and brown spines.

The spider's copulatory organs are similar to related species but differ in details. The male has small dark brown pedipalps. It has a rounded rhomboid cymbium that partially surrounds the palpal bulb. The bulb consists of a bulging tegulum that has a shelf-like bulge that points away from the cymbium. Near to the point at the bottom of the tegulum, a relatively long curved embolus extends, running along the side of the tegulum to extend beyond it into a groove in the cymbium. The embolus has a small hooked end. There is another projection near the base of the cymbium and tegulum. The palpal tibia has a clump of hairs on it and a rather short curved spike, or palpal apophysis, that has a forked ending.

The female of the species is similar in size to the male. It has a cephalothorax that has a length between 2.85 and 3.02 mm (0.112 and 0.119 in) and a width between 1.95 and 2.3 mm (0.077 and 0.091 in). In most examples, the carapace is brown with yellow or orange edges but some are black all over. All have a black eye field. There is a covering of whitish-grey hairs visible on the surface of the carapace and a small number of very small brown hairs near the eyes themselves. The underside of the cephalothorax is yellow with darker edges. The spider has yellow or brown chelicerae while the other mouthparts, the labium and maxillae, are always brown, although some specimen have yellow edges.

The female abdomen is similar in size to its carapace. The top of the abdomen is brown with a sheen like the male. In some specimen there is a visible streak of white hairs across the middle. The bottom of the abdomen has three dark stripes that run from the front to the back. Otherwise, it is lighter than the top. The spider has brown spinnerets and yellow legs and pedipalps. In some examples, the front legs are brown. The spider's epigyne, the external visible part of its copulatory organs is small and has two round copulatory openings. Internally, the relatively short insemination ducts, which show slight signs of sclerotization. They lead to multi-chambered spermathecae, or receptacles.

The spider is similar to Mendoza elongata, Mendoza ibarakiensis. Mendoza magister, Mendoza nobilis and Mendoza pulchra. Compared to Mendoza ibarakiensis, the female is smaller with a paler sternum and shorter insemination ducts. The forked nature of the male's tibial apophysis distinguishes this species from its relatives. All these species were first allocated to the genus Marpissa and were transferred to Mendoza in 1999.

== Distribution and habitat ==
Mendoza are, along with Marpissa, the only marpissines that live in Afro-Eurasia, Mendoza spiders live in the palearctic realm, the majority of species being found in Japan and Manchuria. Mendoza dersuuzalai is endemic to Russia. The holotype was found in Khabarovsk Krai in 1987. It has also been observed living in the Khingan Nature Reserve in Amur Oblast. The species lives in meadows and damp places found in woods of aspen and larch. Although no examples have been found there, Logunov expects that the spider may also live in China.
