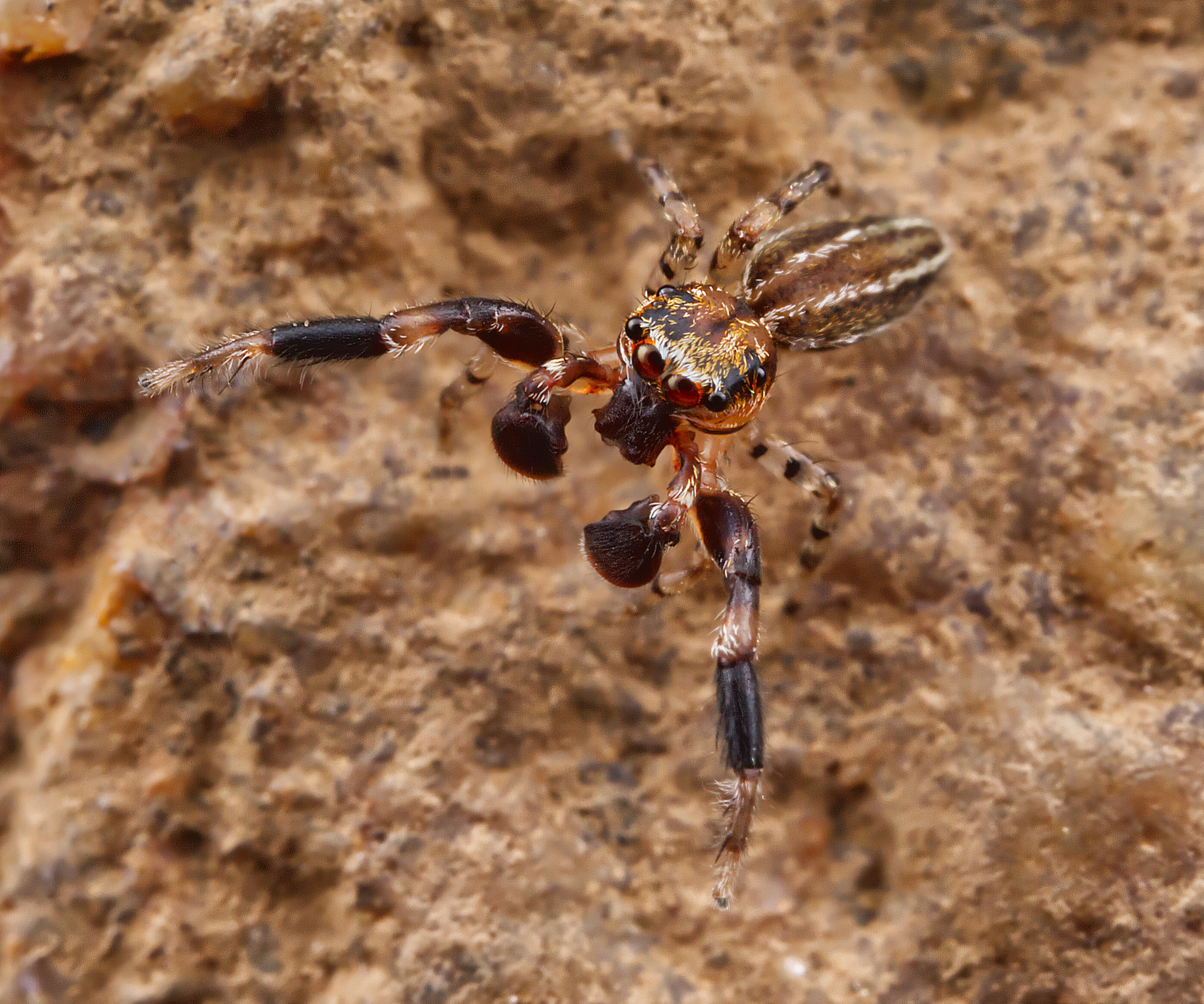
- Adult male in New Jersey

Scientific classification
- Kingdom: Animalia
- Phylum: Arthropoda
- Subphylum: Chelicerata
- Class: Arachnida
- Order: Araneae
- Infraorder: Araneomorphae
- Family: Salticidae
- Genus: Marpissa
- Species: M. dentoides

Binomial name
- Marpissa dentoides Barnes, 1958

= Marpissa dentoides =

Species of jumping spider

Marpissa dentoides is a species of spider in the family Salticidae. It is native to the eastern United States from Massachusetts south to Florida. It is almost identical in appearance to the sympatric Marpissa lineata, but it can be differentiated by the small, spike-like protrusion on the lateral end of the palps. It is found in various habitats including leaf litter and dunes. The holotype was collected in Sea Cliff, New York.
