= Mendoza zebra =

Scientific classification
- Kingdom: Animalia
- Phylum: Arthropoda
- Subphylum: Chelicerata
- Class: Arachnida
- Order: Araneae
- Infraorder: Araneomorphae
- Family: Salticidae
- Genus: Mendoza
- Species: M. zebra

Binomial name
- Mendoza zebra (Logunov & Wesołowska, 1992)

Species of jumping spider

Mendoza zebra is a jumping spider species that lives in Russia. It is found in meadows and woods, living in damp areas. The male was first described in 1992. It is a yellow medium-sized spider, typically with a cephalothorax typically measuring 1.98 mm (0.078 in) and an abdomen that is typically 2.53 mm (0.100 in) long. The top of the spider is marked with a brown pattern, with rectangles on the cephalothorax and streaks on the abdomen. There are also dark streaks on the bottom of the abdomen. The spider's copulatory organs are similar to other species in the genus but differ in specific details, including the shape of the tibial apophysis. The yellow hue of the spider's cymbium is also characteristic. The female has not been identified. The species was originally allocated to the genus Marpissa, but was transferred to Mendoza in 1999.

== Taxonomy ==
Mendoza zebra is a species of jumping spider, a member of the family Salticidae, that was first described by the arachnologist Dmitri Logunov and Wanda Wesołowska in 1992. He initially allocated it to the genus Marpissa, first circumscribed by Carl Ludwig Koch in 1846. The spider was seen to have a similar structure of its palpal organs as Marpissa elongata, Marpissa nobilis and Marpissa pulchra. In 1999, Logunov published a work with that reassessed the genus along with the related genera Hyctia and Mendoza. In this, he moved all four species to Mendoza, which had been circumscribed by George and Elizabeth Peckham in 1894, and created a new combination of Mendoza zebra. Along with Marpissa, Mendoza is a member of the subtribe Marpissina in the tribe Dendryphantini. In 2017, Jerzy Prószyński placed the genus in a group named Hyllines, named after the genus Hyllus with 39 other genera.

== Description ==
Mendoza spiders are medium-sized with the male and female being of similar size. The male Mendoza zebra has a cephalothorax that is typically 1.98 mm (0.078 in) long, 1.35 mm (0.053 in) wide and 0.65 mm (0.026 in) high. Its carapace, the hard upper side of its cephalothorax, is yellow and marked with a pattern made brown rectangles. The area near the eyes is black. The underside of the cephalothorax, called the sternum, is also yellow, as are the chelicerae and maxillae. The spider's, labium is brown with a light edge.

The spider's abdomen is typically 2.53 mm (0.100 in) long and 1.02 mm (0.040 in) wide. It is also yellow, but the top is marked with four brown streaks that cut across it, a narrow white line visible on its rear third and three dark streaks that run from the front to the back on the underside. The spider's legs are similarly yellow.

The spider's copulatory organs are similar to related species but differ in details. The male's cymbium is rather large and encloses much of the palpal bulb. The bulb has a large bulge at the bottom and a relatively long curved embolus projecting from the top. There is a rather short curved spike, or apophysis, on the palpal tibia. Its cymbium is yellow, which, along with the shape of the tibial apophysis, distinguishes the species from its relatives. The female has not been described.

== Distribution and habitat ==
Mendoza are, along with Marpissa, the only marpissines that live in Afro-Eurasia, Mendoza spiders live in the palearctic realm, the majority of species being found in Japan and Manchuria. Mendoza zebra is endemic to Russia. The holotype was found in Khabarovsk Krai in 1987. It has also been observed living in the Khingan Nature Reserve in Amur Oblast. The species lives in damp places found in meadows and woods.
