= Proszynskia =

Scientific classification
- Kingdom: Animalia
- Phylum: Arthropoda
- Subphylum: Chelicerata
- Class: Arachnida
- Order: Araneae
- Infraorder: Araneomorphae
- Family: Salticidae
- Subfamily: Salticinae
- Genus: Proszynskia; Kanesharatnam & Benjamin, 2019

Type species
- Viciria diatreta (Simon, 1902)

Species
- Proszynskia anusuae (Tikader & Biswas, 1981); Proszynskia diatreta (Simon, 1902)

Genus of jumping spiders

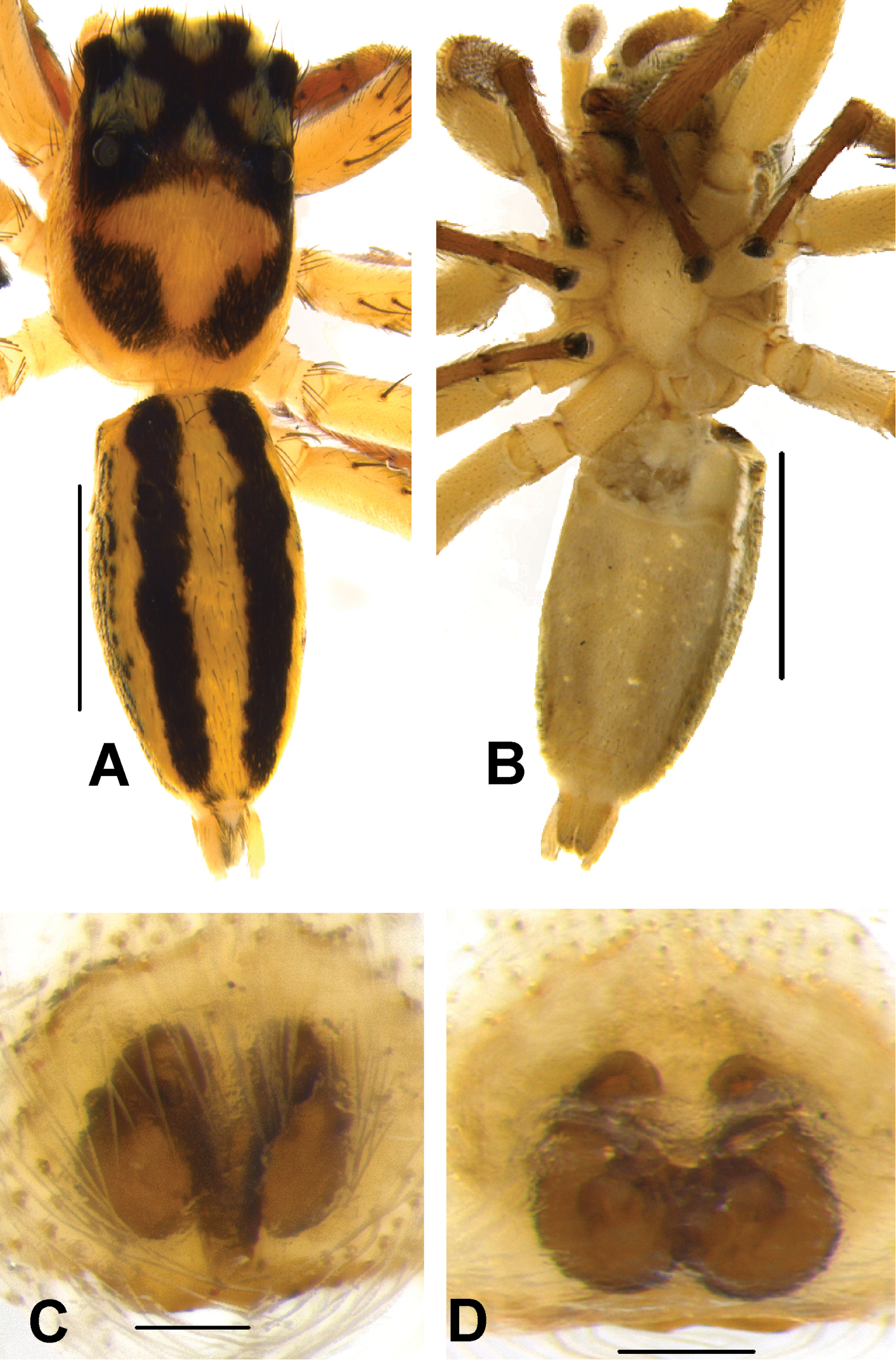
Proszynskia diatreta A, B Female habitus A dorsal view B ventral view C Epigynum, ventral view D Vulva, dorsal view. Scale bars: 2 mm (A, B), 0.1 mm (C–D)

Proszynskia is a small genus of south Asian jumping spiders erected by N. Kanesharatnam and Benjamin in 2019 after a molecular phylogenetic study of south Asian spiders showed the relationship between two species previously belonging to Marpissa and Phintella. They are large for jumping spiders, growing up to 7 to 9 millimetres (0.28 to 0.35 in) long. The thin abdomen has a yellow stripe between two black stripes.

The genus is named after Jerzy Prószyński, a major contributor to the knowledge of jumping spiders, and as of April 2022 it contains only two species: P. anusuae and P. diatreta. The single most likely cladogram shows that Phintelloides is sister to Phintella, with Proszynskia sister to both:

- - Proszynskia
  - - Phintelloides
    - Phintella

== See also ==
- Viciria
- Phintella
- Marpissa
- List of Salticidae genera
