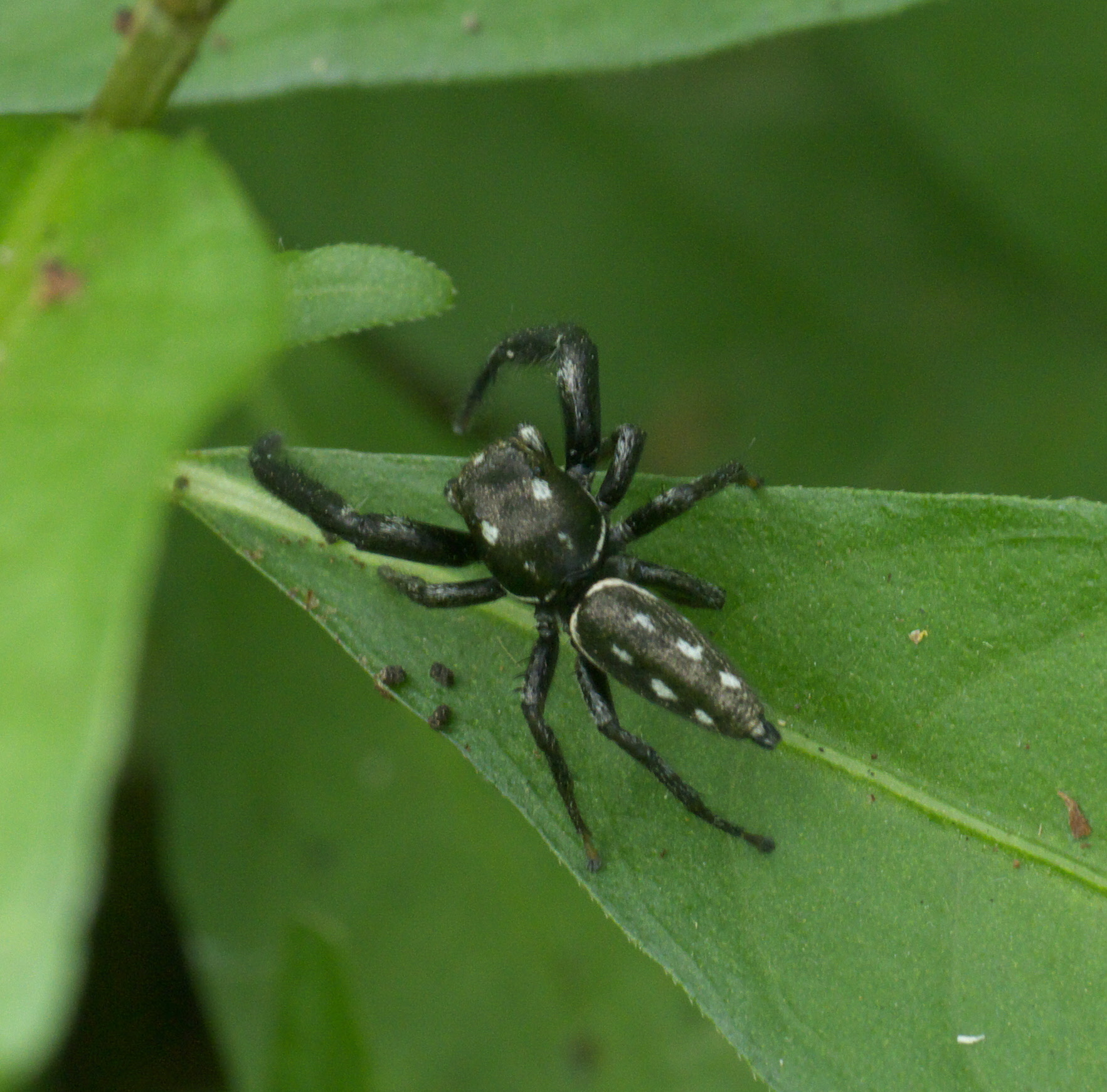

Scientific classification
- Kingdom: Animalia
- Phylum: Arthropoda
- Subphylum: Chelicerata
- Class: Arachnida
- Order: Araneae
- Infraorder: Araneomorphae
- Family: Salticidae
- Genus: Marpissa
- Species: M. formosa

Binomial name
- Marpissa formosa (Banks, 1892)

= Marpissa formosa =

Species of spider

Marpissa formosa is a species of jumping spider. It is found in the eastern United States.

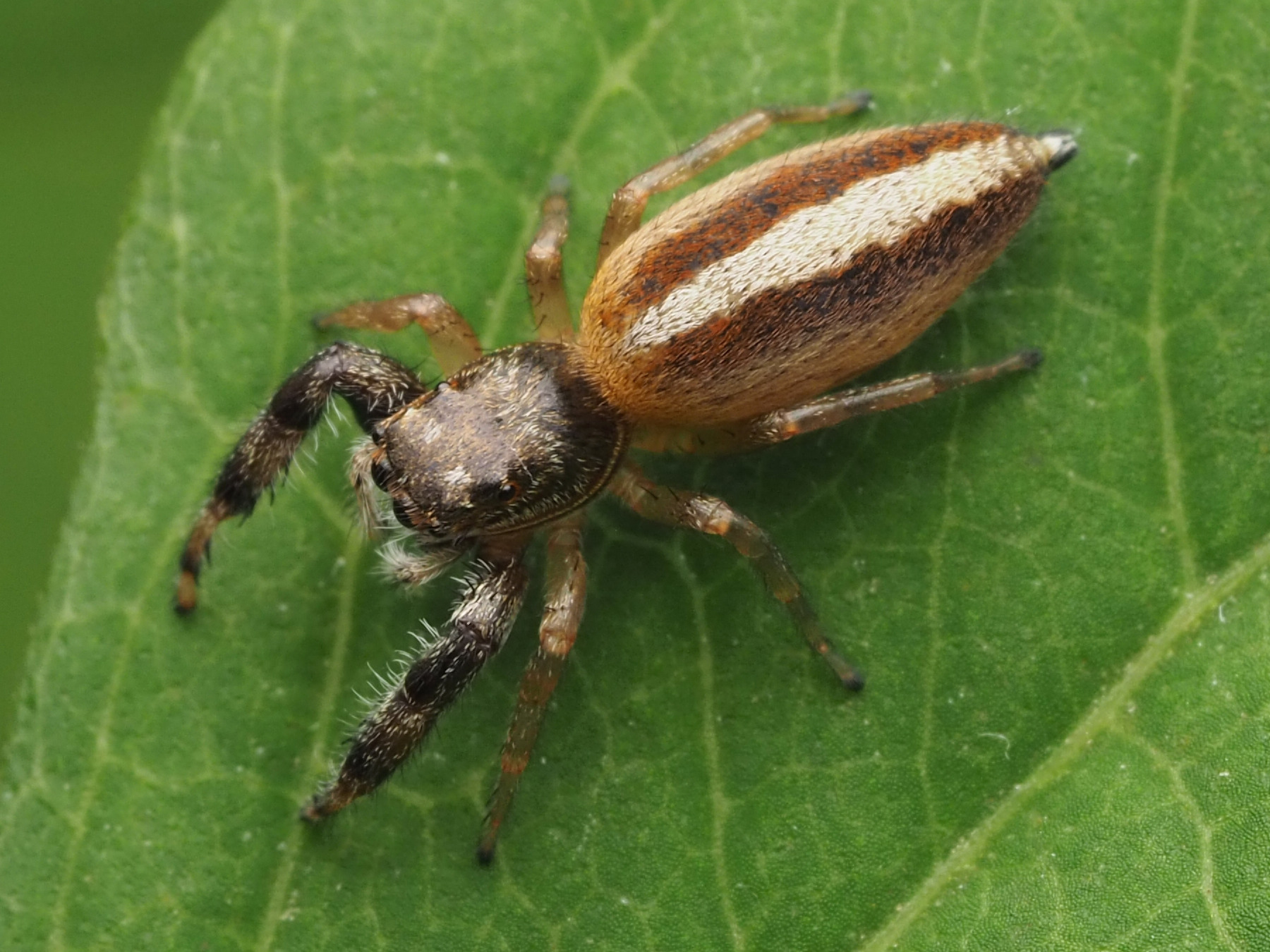
Adult female dorsal

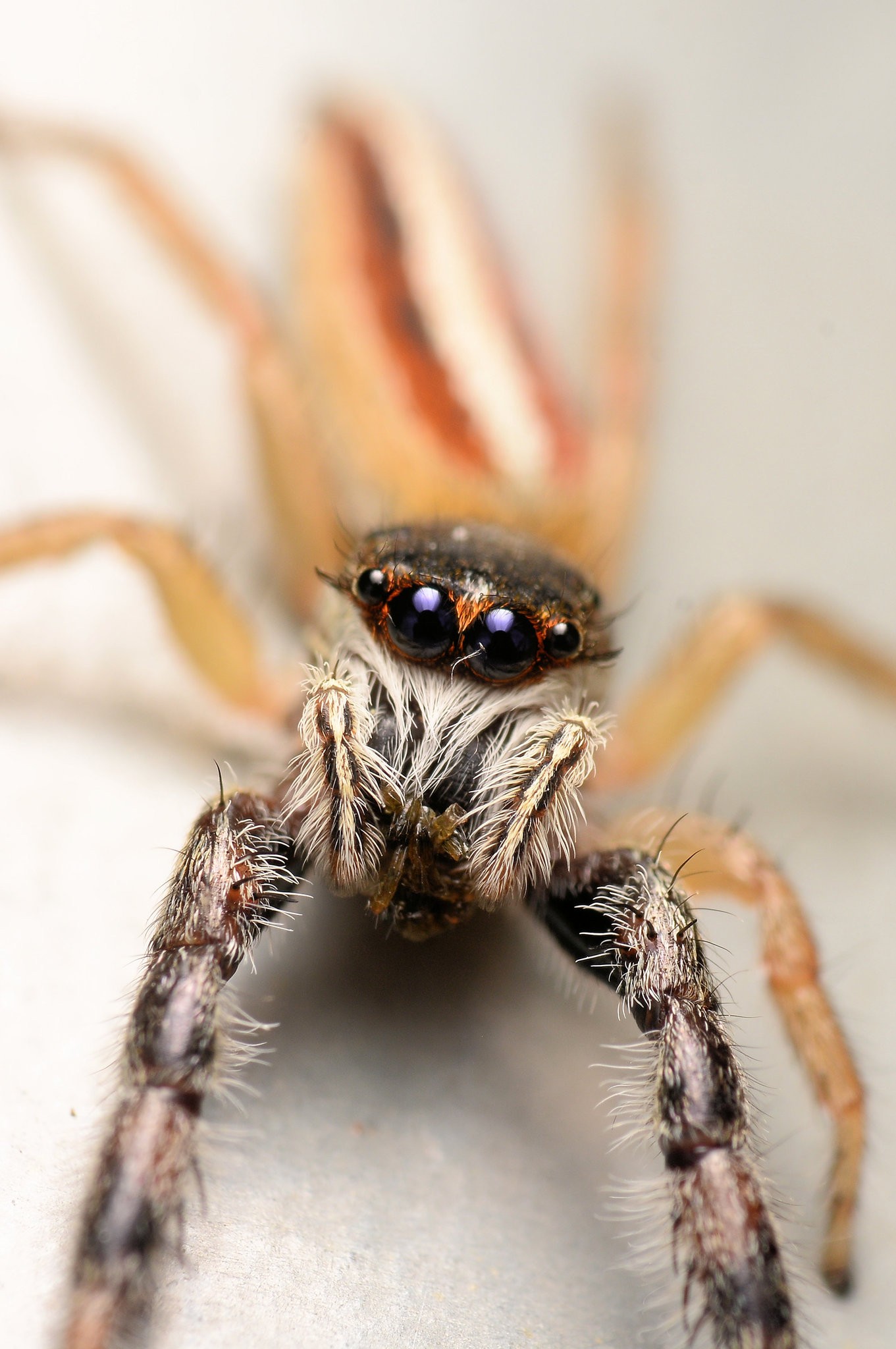
Adult female face
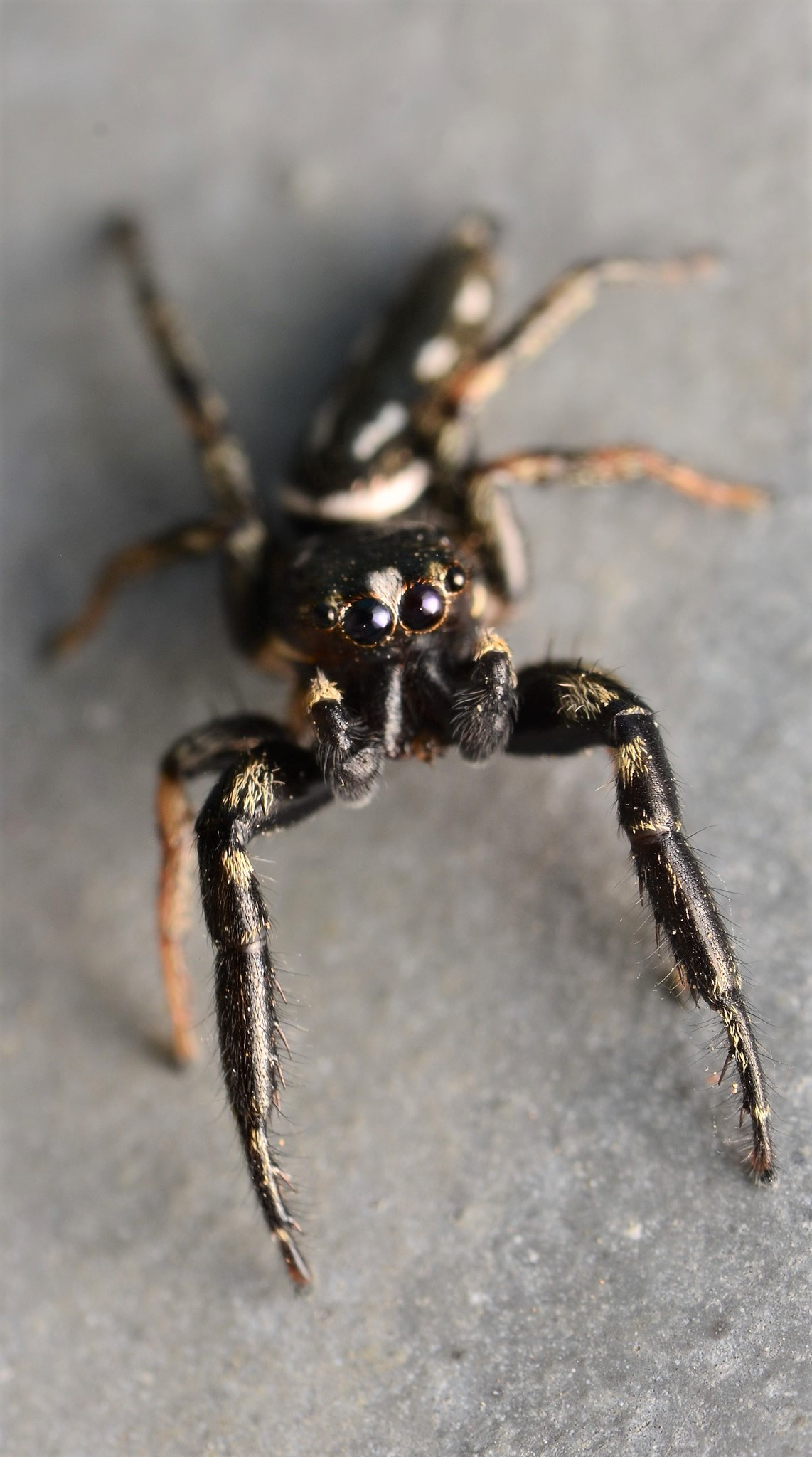
Adult male face

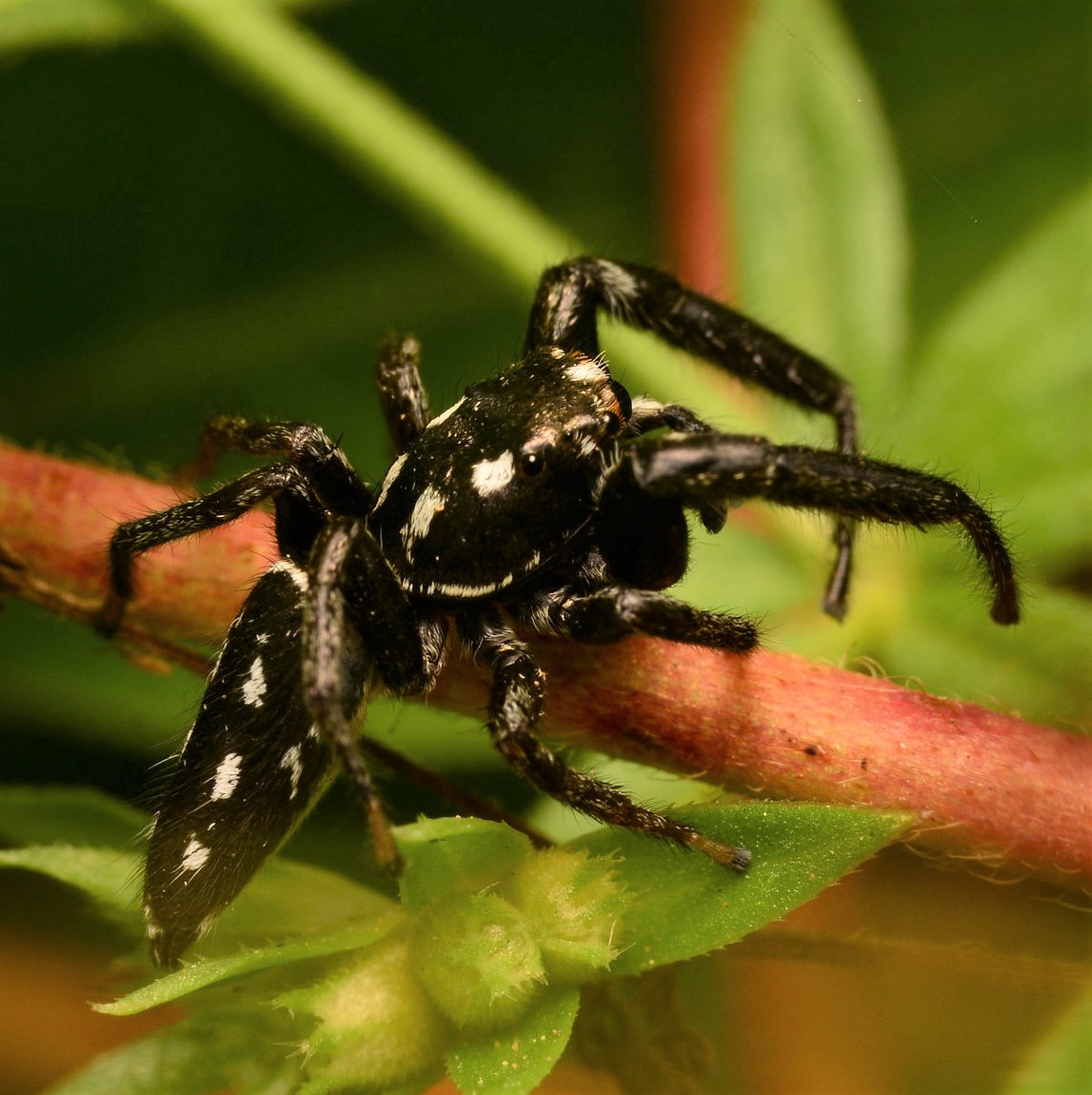
Adult male dorsal
