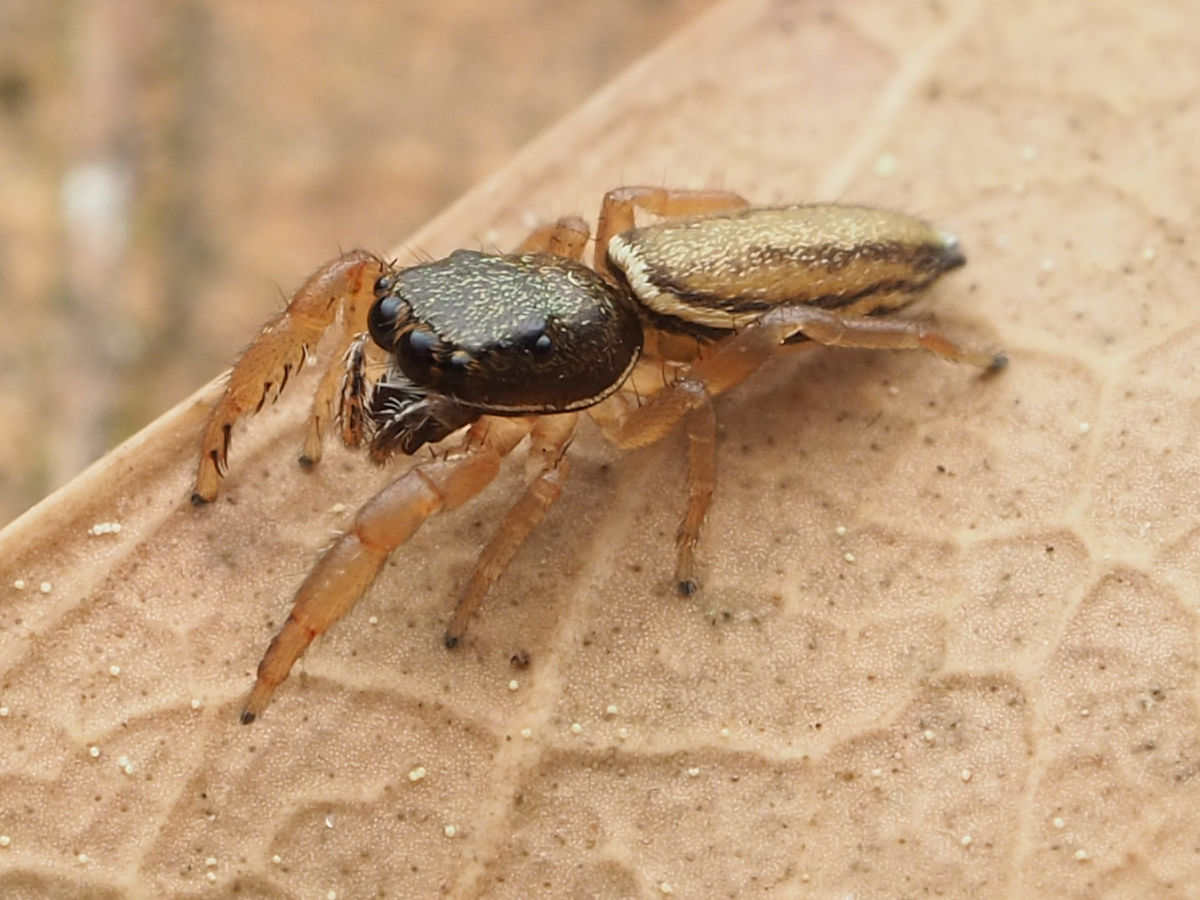
- Female in Florida

Scientific classification
- Kingdom: Animalia
- Phylum: Arthropoda
- Subphylum: Chelicerata
- Class: Arachnida
- Order: Araneae
- Infraorder: Araneomorphae
- Family: Salticidae
- Genus: Marpissa
- Species: M. grata

Binomial name
- Marpissa grata (Gertsch, 1936)

Synonyms
- Hyctia grata Gertsch, 1936; Marpissa wallacei Barnes, 1958

= Marpissa grata =

Species of spider

Marpissa grata is a species of jumping spider in the family Salticidae. It is found in the United States and Canada. As of 2012, it is known from Ontario in Canada, and from Florida, Iowa, Michigan, and Minnesota in the United States.
