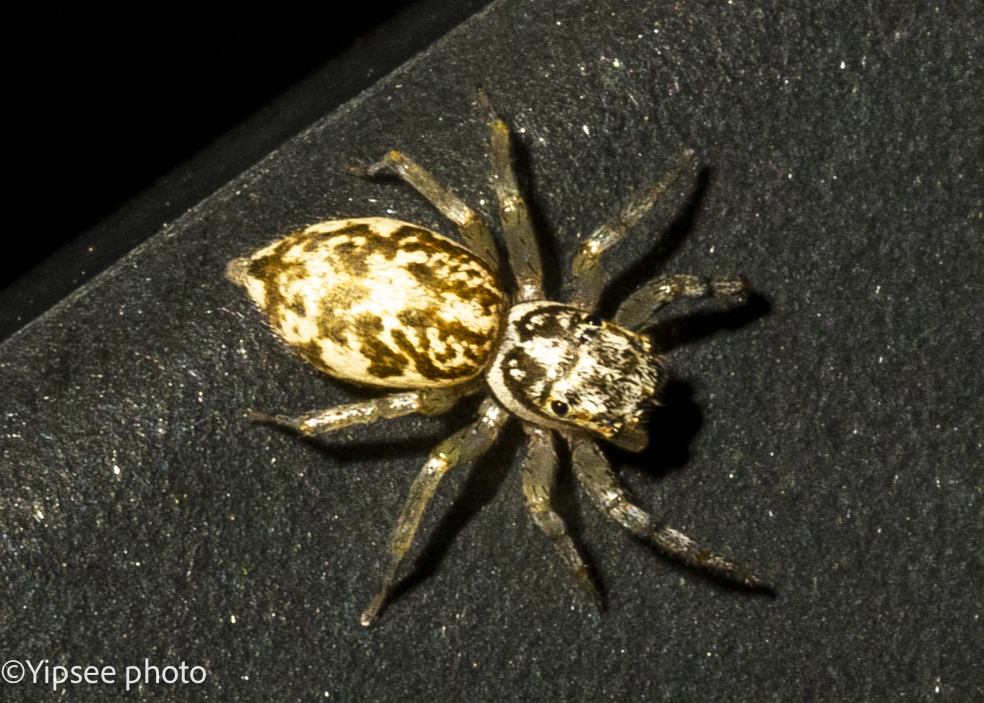
- female P. versicolor from Thailand
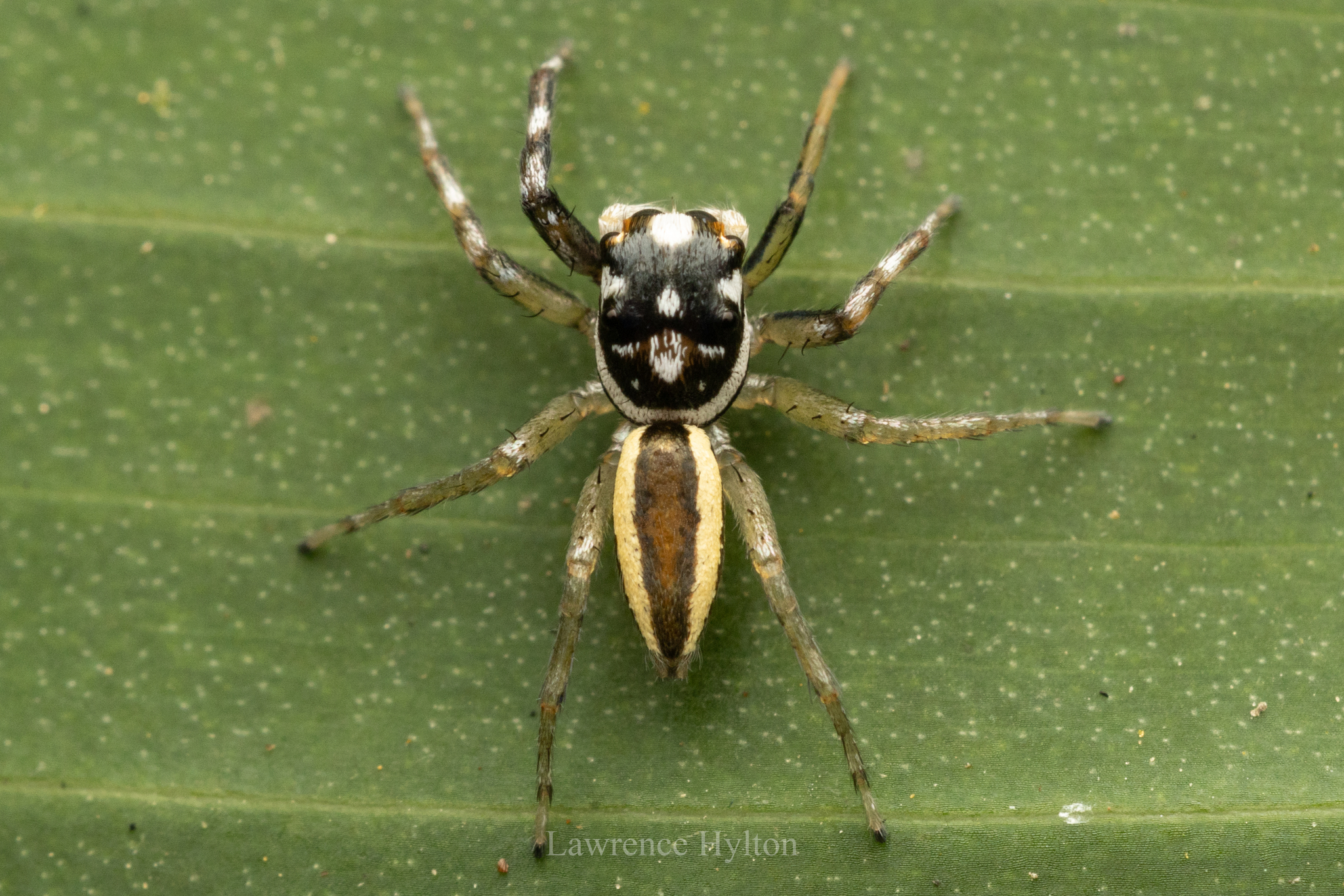
- male P. versicolor from Malaysia

Scientific classification
- Kingdom: Animalia
- Phylum: Arthropoda
- Subphylum: Chelicerata
- Class: Arachnida
- Order: Araneae
- Infraorder: Araneomorphae
- Family: Salticidae
- Subfamily: Salticinae
- Genus: Phintelloides; Kanesharatnam & Benjamin, 2019

Type species
- Chrysilla jesudasi (Caleb & Mathai, 2014)

Species
- 11, see text

= Phintelloides =

Genus of jumping spiders

Phintelloides is a genus of Asian jumping spiders erected by N. Kanesharatnam and Benjamin in 2019 after a molecular phylogenetic study of similar Asian Salticidae species. The single most likely cladogram shows that Phintelloides is sister to Phintella, with Proszynskia sister to both:

- - Proszynskia
  - - Phintelloides
    - Phintella

The name is a combination of the "Phintell", referring to the genus Phintella, and the Latin suffix "-oides", meaning "like".

== Species ==
As of April 2022 it contains eleven species:

- P. alborea Kanesharatnam & Benjamin, 2019 – Sri Lanka
- P. brunne Kanesharatnam & Benjamin, 2019 – Sri Lanka
- P. flavoviri Kanesharatnam & Benjamin, 2019 – Sri Lanka
- P. flavumi Kanesharatnam & Benjamin, 2019 – Sri Lanka
- P. jesudasi (Caleb & Mathai, 2014) (type) – India, Sri Lanka
- P. manipur Caleb, 2020 – India
- P. orbisa Kanesharatnam & Benjamin, 2019 – Sri Lanka
- P. pengi Wang & Li, 2021 – China
- P. singhi (Monga, Singh & Sadana, 1989) – India
- P. undulatus (Caleb & Karthikeyani, 2015) – India
- P. versicolor (C. L. Koch, 1846) – Pakistan, India, Myanmar, Thailand, Malaysia, China, Taiwan, Korea, Taiwan, Japan, Indonesia (Sumatra). Introduced to USA (Hawaii)

== See also ==
- Phintella
- Chrysilla
- Proszynskia
- List of Salticidae genera
