= Marpissa armifera =

Conservation status
- Data Deficient (NZ TCS)

Scientific classification
- Kingdom: Animalia
- Phylum: Arthropoda
- Subphylum: Chelicerata
- Class: Arachnida
- Order: Araneae
- Infraorder: Araneomorphae
- Family: Salticidae
- Genus: Marpissa
- Species: M. armifera

Binomial name
- Marpissa armifera Urquhart, 1892

Species of spider

Marpissa armifera is a species of jumping spider that is endemic to New Zealand.

== Taxonomy ==
This species was described by Arthur Urquhart in 1892 from male and female specimens.

== Description ==
The male is recorded at 4mm in length whereas the female is 5.6mm.

== Distribution ==
This species is endemic to New Zealand.

== Conservation status ==
Under the New Zealand Threat Classification System, this species is listed as "Data Deficient" with the qualifiers of "Data Poor: Size", "Data Poor: Trend" and "One Location".
