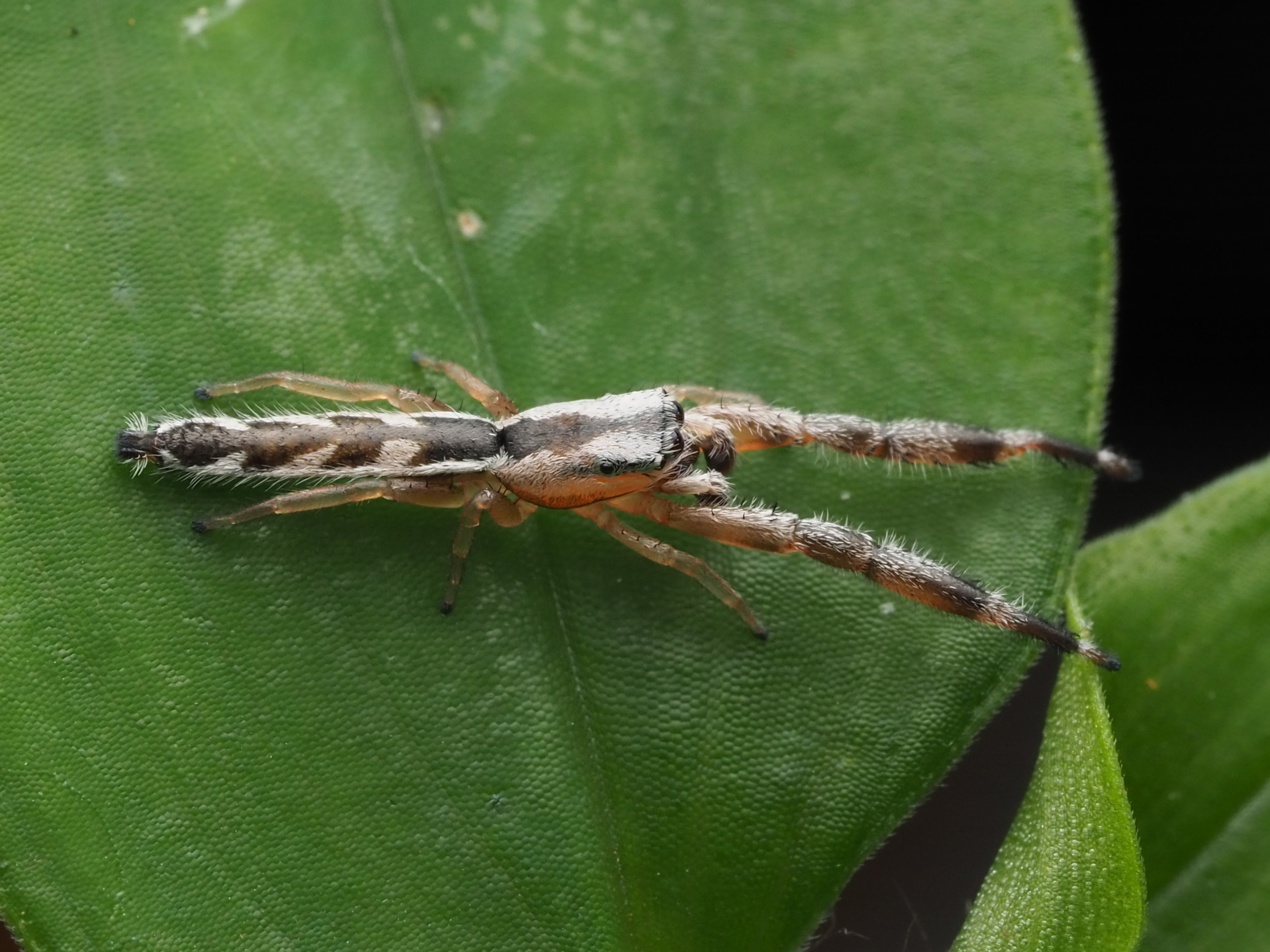
- Male in Florida

Scientific classification
- Kingdom: Animalia
- Phylum: Arthropoda
- Subphylum: Chelicerata
- Class: Arachnida
- Order: Araneae
- Infraorder: Araneomorphae
- Family: Salticidae
- Genus: Marpissa
- Species: M. pikei

Binomial name
- Marpissa pikei (Peckham & Peckham, 1888)

Synonyms
- Hyctia pikei

= Marpissa pikei =

Species of spider

Marpissa pikei is a species of jumping spider that is found in the eastern United States (Texas, Oklahoma, New Mexico, Arizona), Mexico, and Cuba.

== Description ==
Marpissa pikei has a very elongated form, which enables it to hide while stretching along twigs or blades of grass. It rests by extending its first two pairs of legs in front of its body and the remaining two pairs posteriorly.

Both sexes are about 8 mm long, excluding the legs. While the male has a broad black median stripe spanning the whole body and orange first legs and carapace orange, the female has a duller coloration, with the abdomen pale cream-colored, speckled with black.

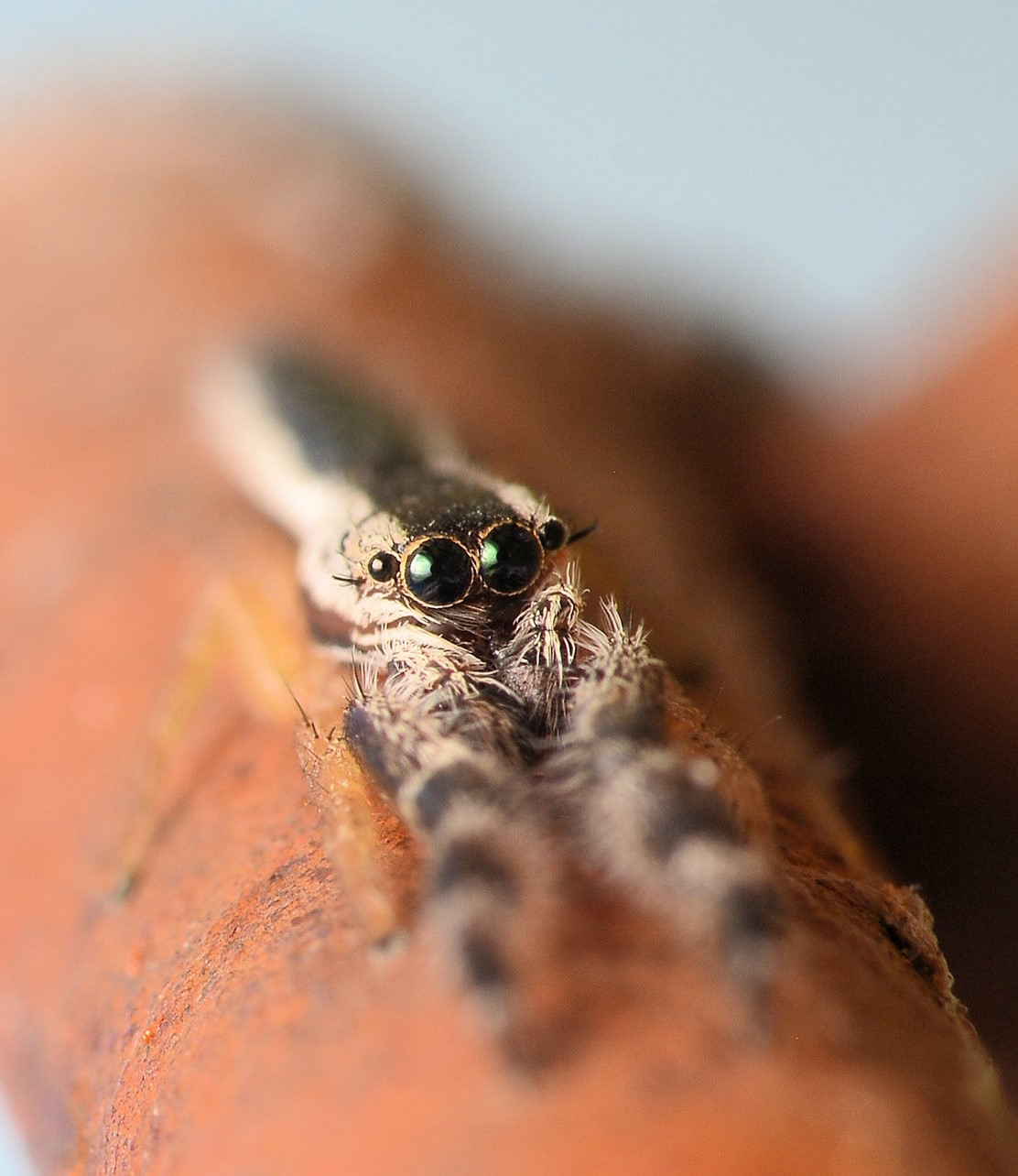
Adult male face

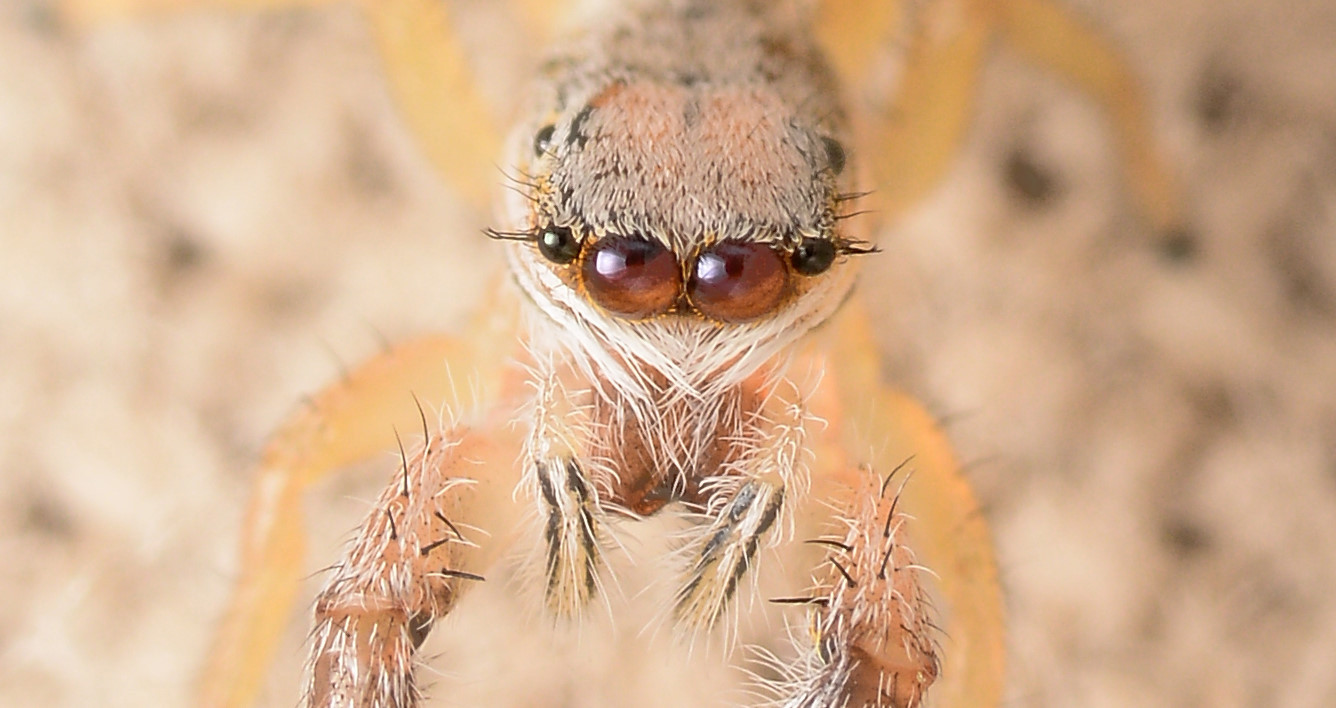
Adult female face
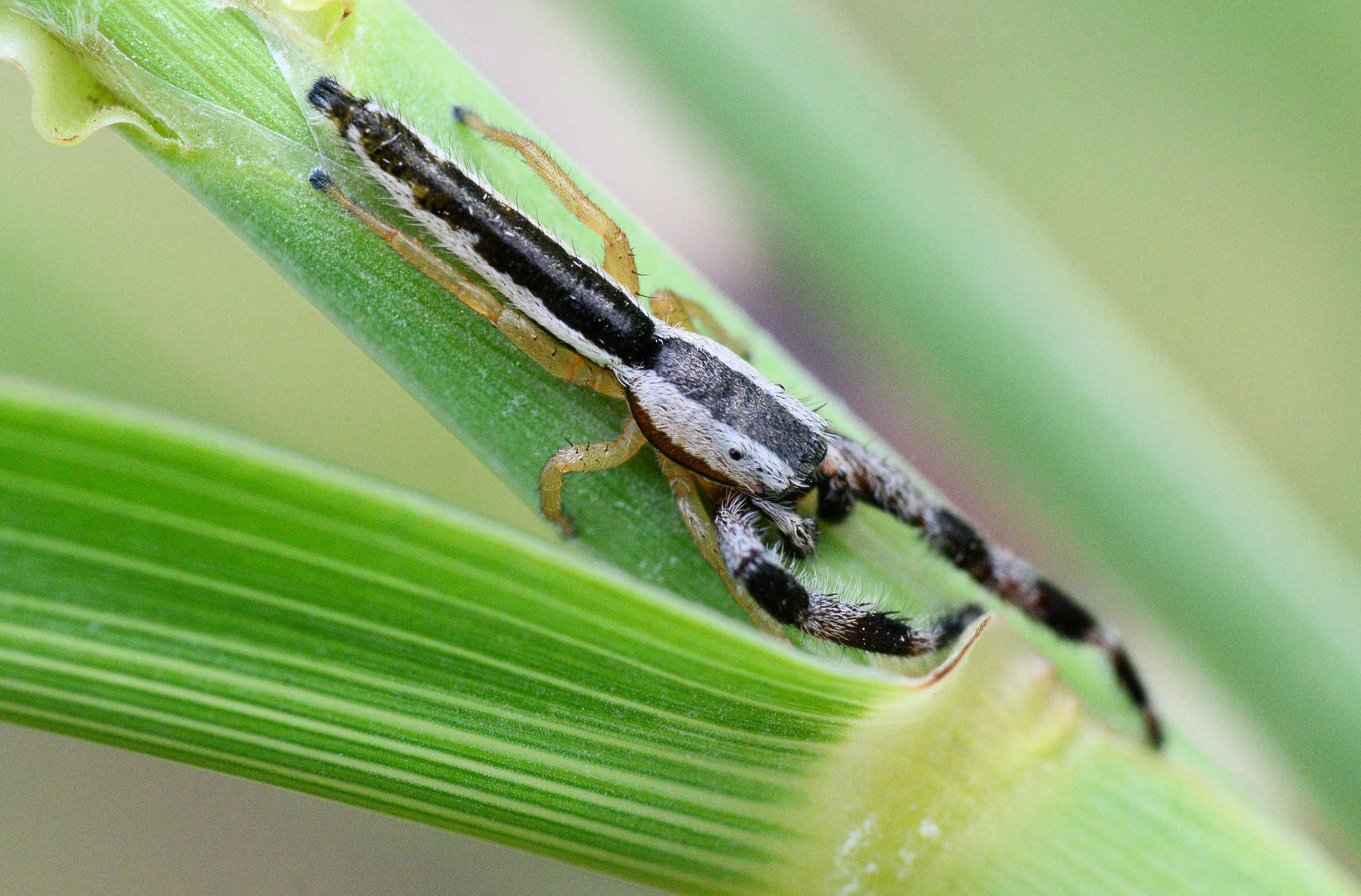
Adult male dorsal

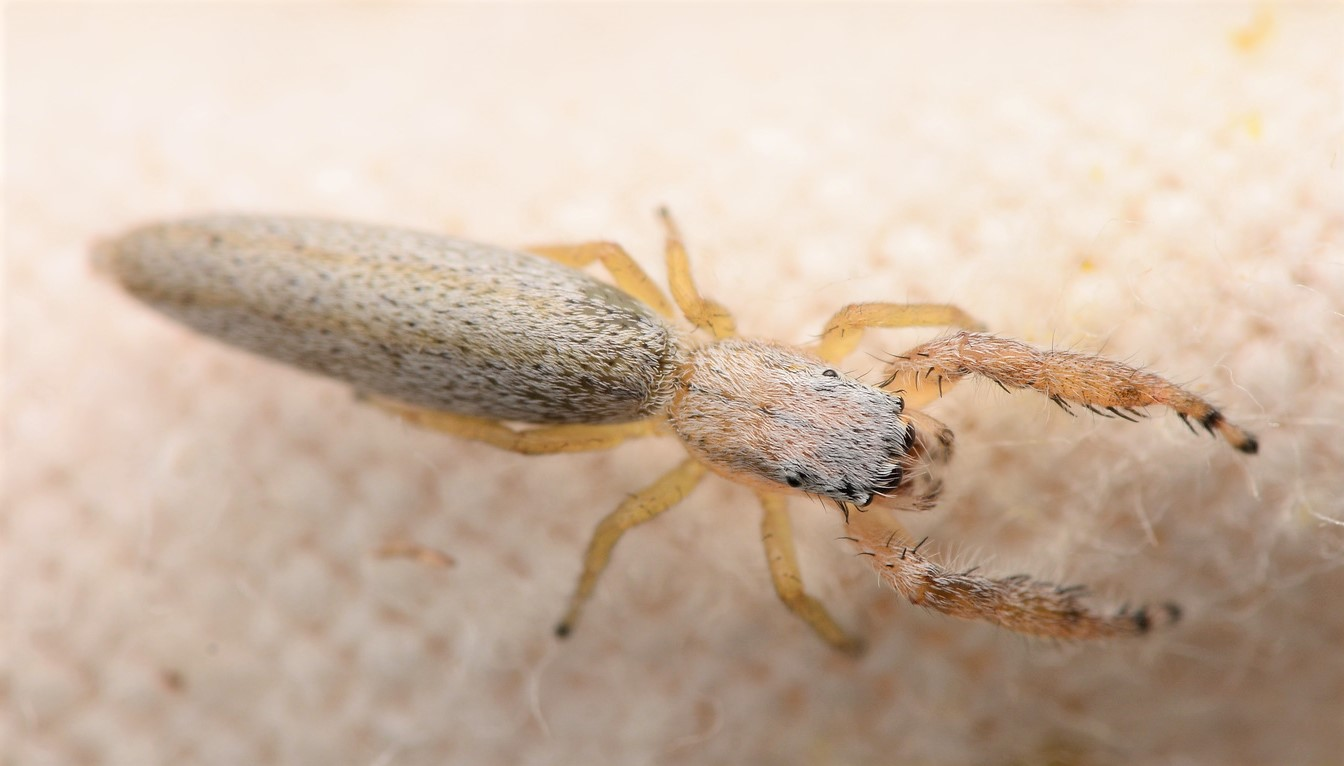
Adult female dorsal

== Habits ==
These spiders are very hard to find when not moving. Once they do move, they do so exceedingly quick and jerky. The enlarged first pair of legs is not used in walking, but are extended in front. When males spot a female, they approach it with their front legs extended and waving, prior to mating.

== Distribution ==
They are usually found on low grasses. Kaston (1981) reports it as readily swept from tall grasses, especially along seashores. In Kansas, adults are found from May to October.

== Name ==
This species is commonly called pike slender jumper or long-bodied jumping spider.
