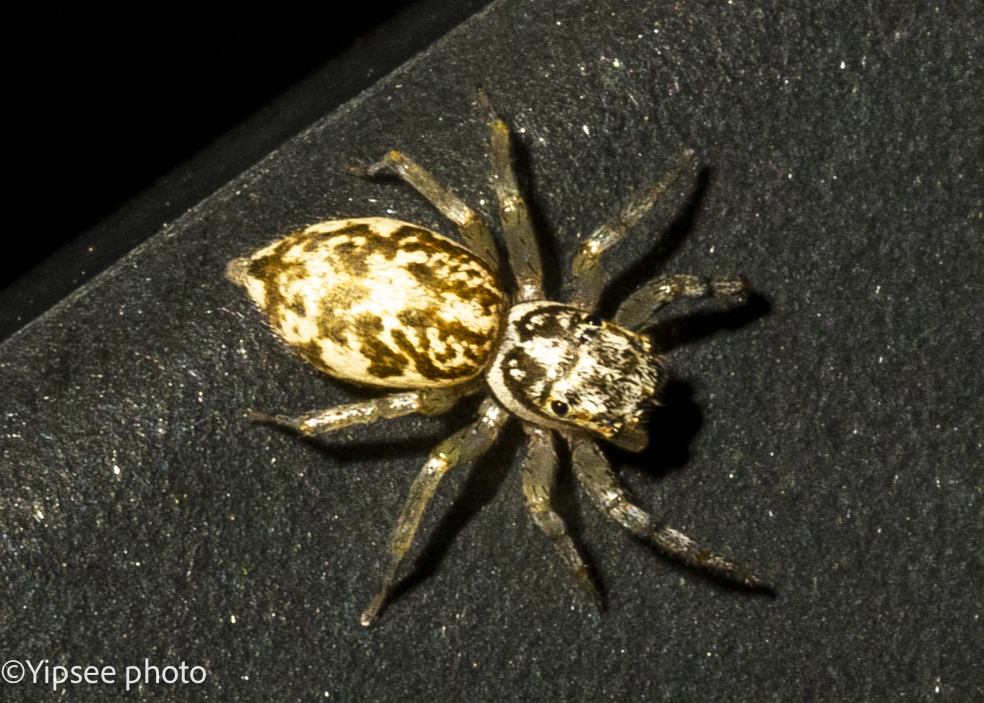
- female from Thailand
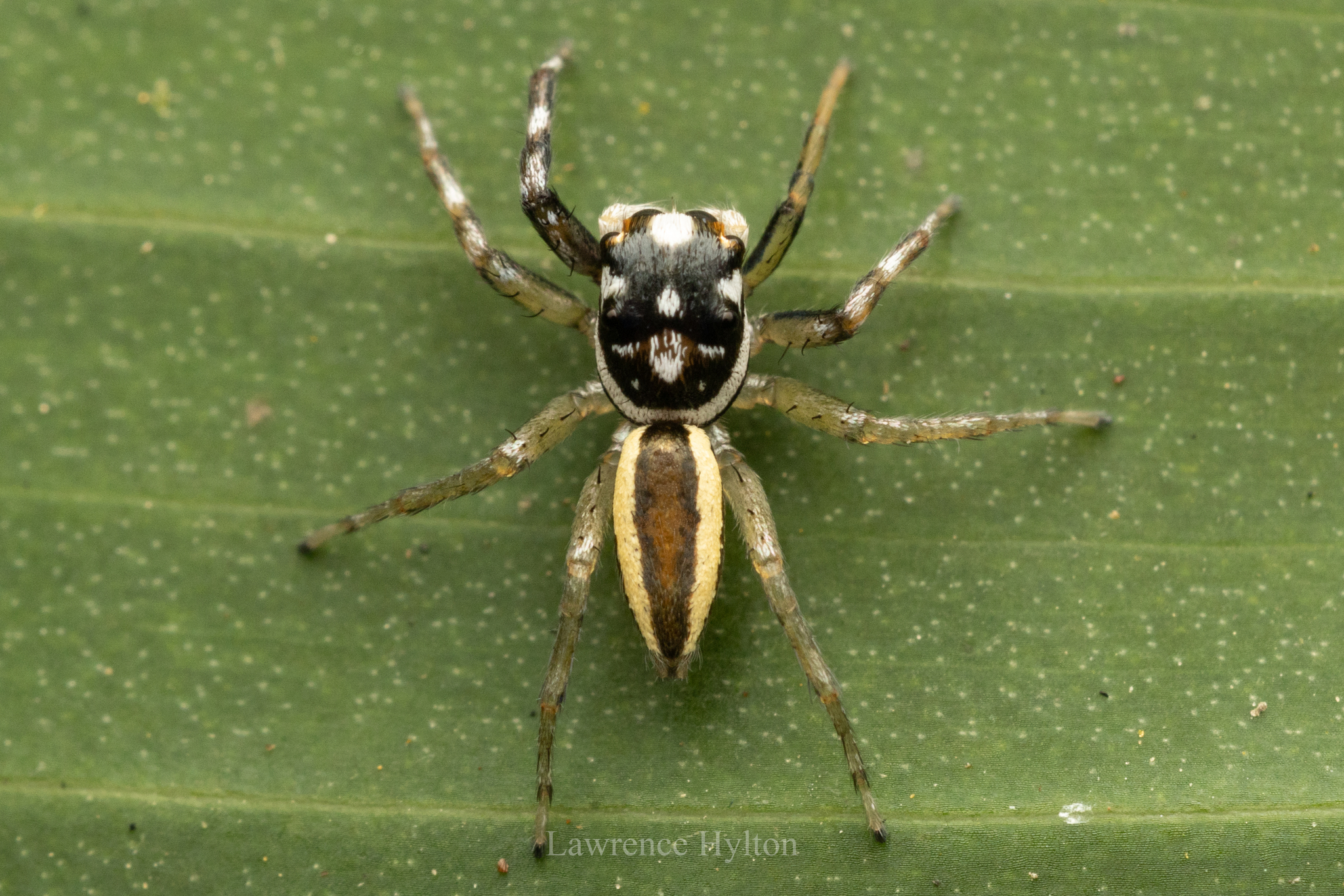
- male from Malaysia

Scientific classification
- Kingdom: Animalia
- Phylum: Arthropoda
- Subphylum: Chelicerata
- Class: Arachnida
- Order: Araneae
- Infraorder: Araneomorphae
- Family: Salticidae
- Genus: Phintelloides
- Species: P. versicolor

Binomial name
- Phintelloides versicolor (C. L. Koch, 1846)

Synonyms
- Plexippus versicolor C. L. Koch, 1846; Maevia picta C. L. Koch, 1848; Attus versicolor (C. L. Koch, 1846); Chrysilla versicolor (C. L. Koch, 1846); Telamonia leucaspis Simon, 1903; Phintella versicolor (C. L. Koch, 1846); Phintella leucaspis (Simon, 1903)

= Phintelloides versicolor =

Multi-Coloured Phintella

Species of jumping spider

Phintelloides versicolor is a species of jumping spider in the family Salticidae. Originally described from Bintan Island in Indonesia, it is widely distributed across tropical Southeast Asia.

== Taxonomy ==
The species was originally described as Plexippus versicolor by C. L. Koch in 1846 from a male specimen collected on Bintan Island between Singapore and Sumatra. Two years later, Koch described what he believed to be a different species, Maevia picta, from the same locality, which was later determined to be the female of the same species.

The species has been placed in multiple genera throughout its taxonomic history, including Attus, Chrysilla, Phintella, and most recently Phintelloides. Recent taxonomic work by Deeleman-Reinhold et al. (2024) confirmed the placement in Phintelloides and synonymized Telamonia leucaspis Simon, 1903 with this species.

== Distribution ==
P. versicolor has a wide distribution across tropical Southeast Asia. It has been recorded from Pakistan, India, Myanmar, Thailand, Vietnam, Malaysia, Singapore, Brunei, and Indonesia (Sumatra). Specific locality records include specimens from Malaysia (Selangor), Singapore (Lim Chu Kang), and Thailand (Kanchanaburi Province, Prachuap Khiri Khan Province, and Chiang Mai).

== Habitat ==
The species has been found in various habitats including forests on limestone and at elevations ranging from sea level to approximately 300 meters.

== Description ==
Illustration of female (1846)

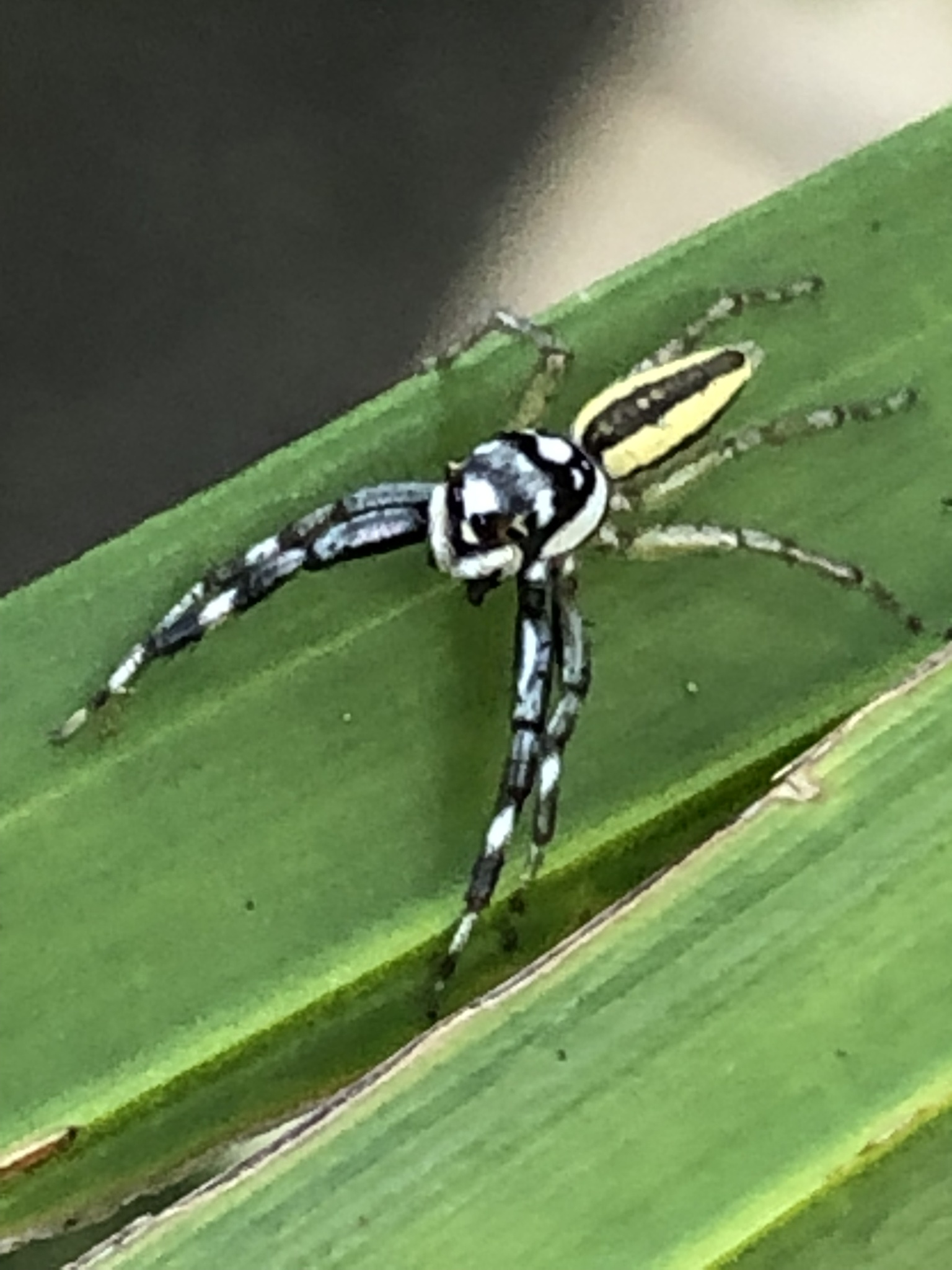
Male from Penang

Phintelloides versicolor exhibits sexual dimorphism in both coloration and pattern. Both sexes have distinctive flattened white hairs on the clypeus, though this feature is more pronounced in females, which display a frontal strip of thick white flattened setae across the entire carapace width. Males show just a small white "moustache" below the anterior median eyes.

The species is easily recognizable by its distinctive abdominal pattern. In males, the abdomen features a dark central band flanked by lateral white bands (appearing yellow in life), which is the reverse of the pattern found in most related Chrysilla and Phintella species. This reversed coloration pattern is reflected in the species' Latin name "versicolor." The thoracic region displays a wide submarginal band with dark edges, and in live specimens appears black with two white central patches and several smaller ones.

Females differ significantly in appearance, with the carapace showing a pair of black semi-rings on a light background on the posterior thorax. The female abdomen is dorsally pale with irregular cinnamon-brown blotches and a central white band.

Males typically measure 4.4-6.3 mm in total length, while detailed measurements for a male from Sam Roi Yot National Park showed: total length 4.70 mm, carapace 2.30 mm long and 1.80 mm wide. The legs in males are dark with light rings on the tibia, metatarsus and tarsus, while female legs and palps are pale.
