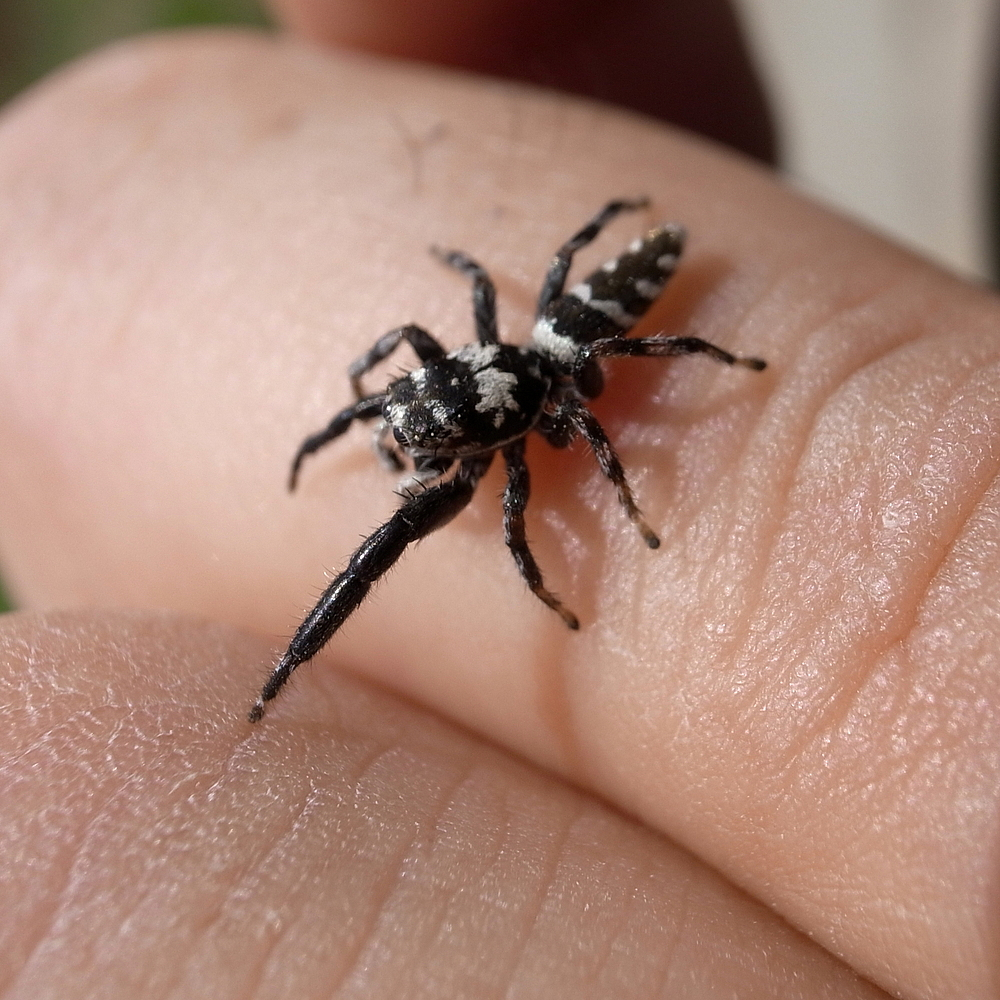
- Mendoza elongata

Scientific classification
- Kingdom: Animalia
- Phylum: Arthropoda
- Subphylum: Chelicerata
- Class: Arachnida
- Order: Araneae
- Infraorder: Araneomorphae
- Family: Salticidae
- Subfamily: Salticinae
- Genus: Mendoza; Peckham & Peckham, 1894

Type species
- M. canestrinii (Ninni, 1868)

Species
- see text

= Mendoza (spider) =

Genus of spiders

Mendoza is a genus of jumping spiders that was first described by George and Elizabeth Peckham in 1894.

== Species ==
As of August 2026 it contains twenty-two species, found in Africa, Asia, and Europe:

- Mendoza canestrinii (Ninni, 1868) – Europe, North Africa, Caucasus, Russia (Europe to Far East), Kazakhstan, Iran, Central Asia, Korea, Japan, China, Vietnam
- Mendoza dersuuzalai (Logunov & Wesołowska, 1992) – Russia (Far East)
- Mendoza elongata (Karsch, 1879) – Russia (Far East), China, Korea, Japan
- Mendoza ibarakiensis (Bohdanowicz & Prószyński, 1987) – Japan
- Mendoza nobilis (Grube, 1861) – Russia (Far East), Korea, China
- Mendoza pulchra (Prószyński, 1981) – Russia (Far East), Korea, China, Japan
- Mendoza ryukyuensis Baba, 2007 – Japan
- Mendoza zebra (Logunov & Wesołowska, 1992) – Russia (Far East)
- Mendoza cognata (G. W. Peckham & E. G. Peckham, 1894) – Japan
- Mendoza eurina (Simon, 1871) – Greece (Rhodes)
- Mendoza gridellii (Caporiacco, 1934) – Italy
- Mendoza hiroseae (Nakatsudi, 1942) – Japan
- Mendoza hotingchiehi (Schenkel, 1963) – China
- Mendoza interrogationis (Bösenberg & Strand, 1906) – Japan
- Mendoza magister (Karsch, 1879) – Russia (Far East), Korea, Japan, China, Vietnam
- Mendoza memorabilis (O. Pickard-Cambridge, 1876) – Libya, Egypt
- Mendoza obscura (Kroneberg, 1875) – Kazakhstan, Central Asia, Russia (South Siberia to Far East), China
- Mendoza pichoni (Schenkel, 1963) – Russia (Far East), China
- Mendoza salsophila (Tystshenko, 1965) – Kazakhstan, China
- Mendoza tschekiangensis (Schenkel, 1963) – Kazakhstan, Russia (Far East), China
- Mendoza suguroi Baba, 2013 – Japan
- Mendoza mori (Kishida, 1931) – Japan
