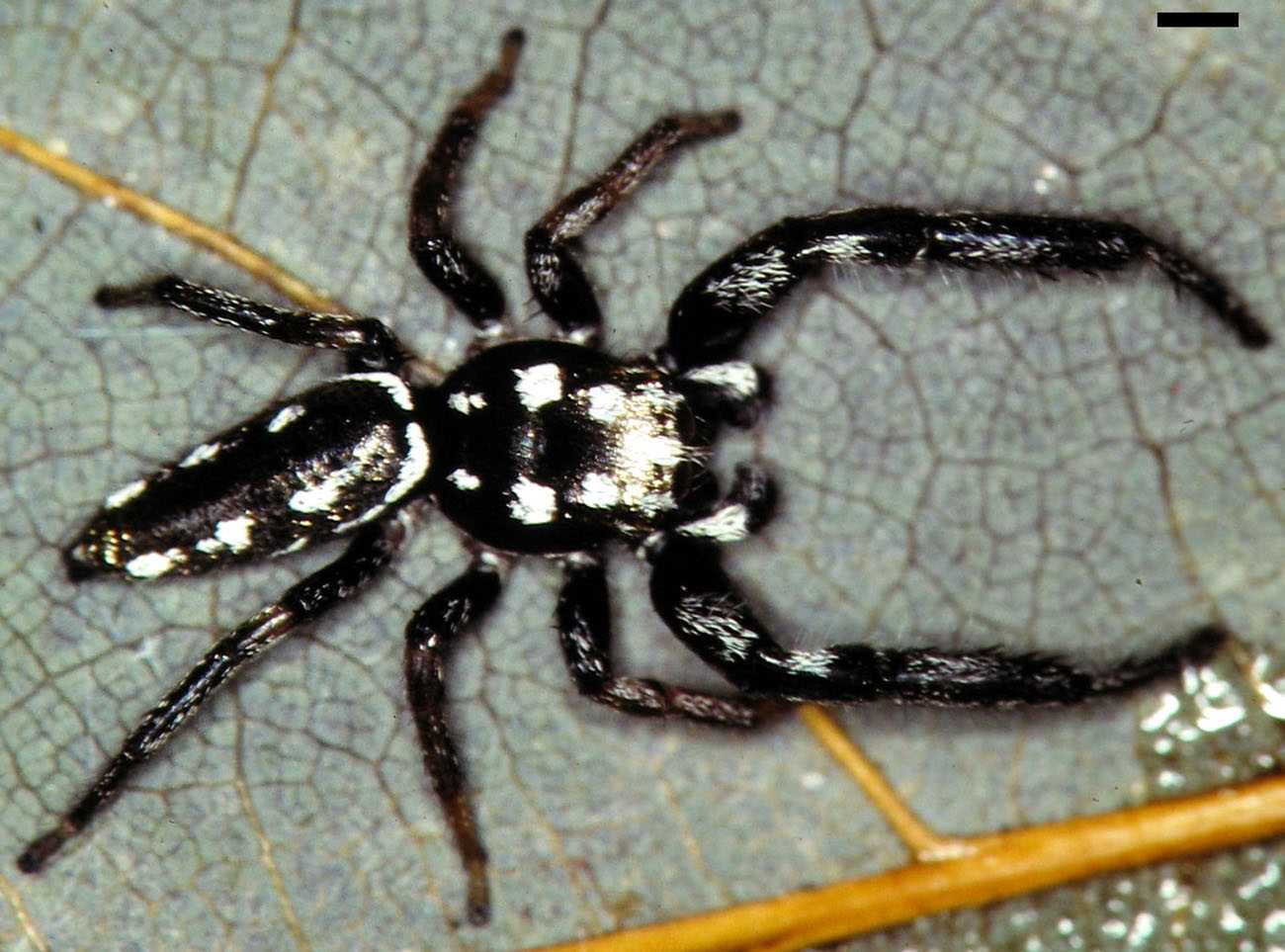
- Male
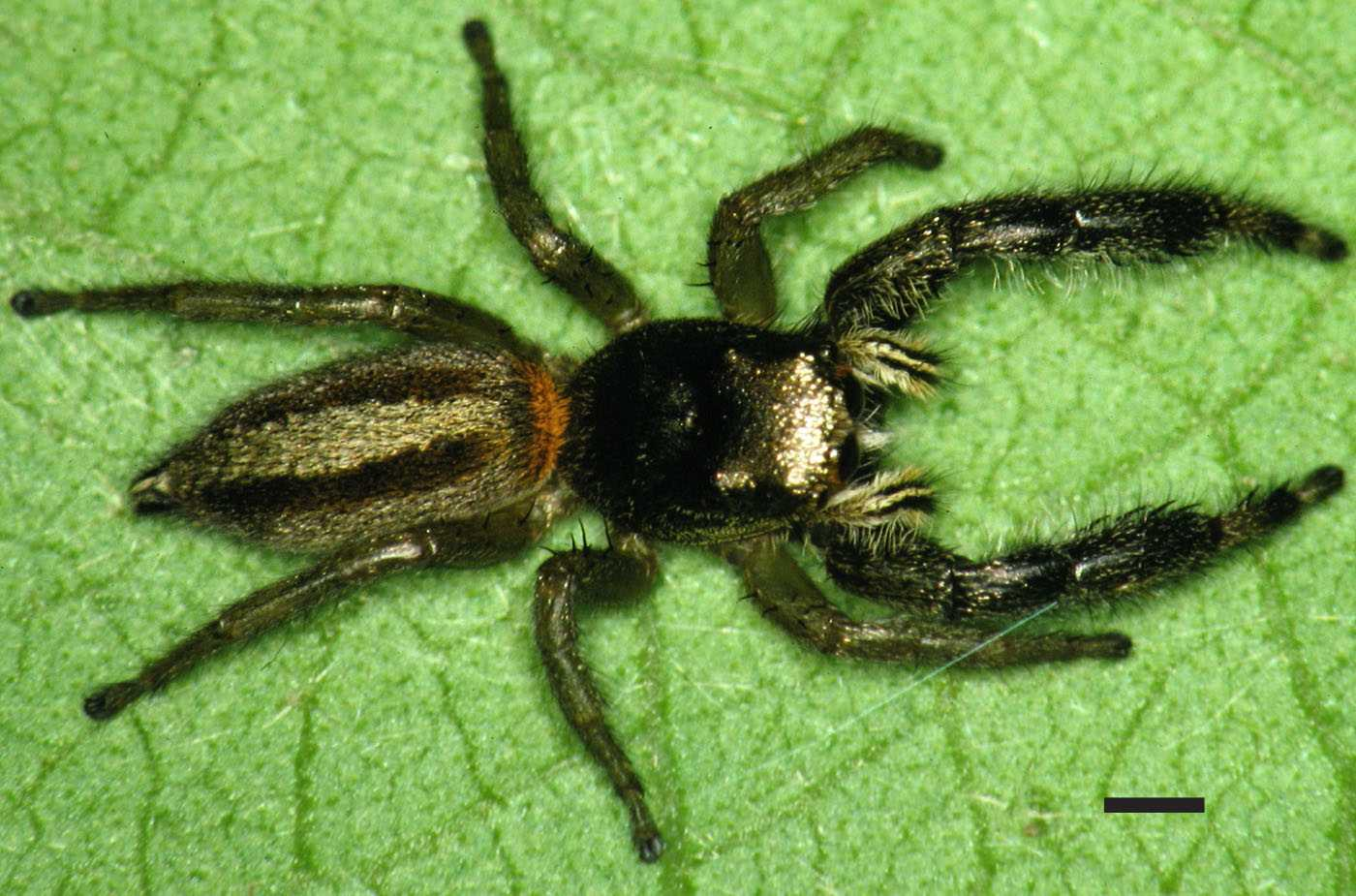
- Female

Scientific classification
- Kingdom: Animalia
- Phylum: Arthropoda
- Subphylum: Chelicerata
- Class: Arachnida
- Order: Araneae
- Infraorder: Araneomorphae
- Family: Salticidae
- Genus: Marpissa
- Species: M. bina

Binomial name
- Marpissa bina (Hentz, 1846)

= Marpissa bina =

Species of spider

Marpissa bina is a species of jumping spider in the family Salticidae. It is found in the United States.
