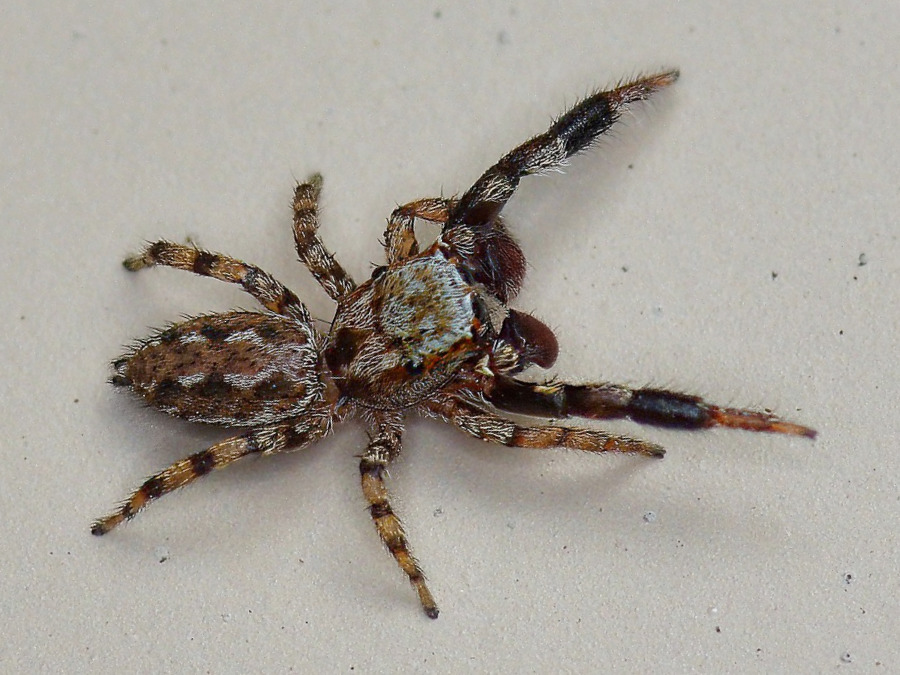
- Male Marpissa obtusa in Texas

Scientific classification
- Kingdom: Animalia
- Phylum: Arthropoda
- Subphylum: Chelicerata
- Class: Arachnida
- Order: Araneae
- Infraorder: Araneomorphae
- Family: Salticidae
- Genus: Marpissa
- Species: M. obtusa

Binomial name
- Marpissa obtusa Barnes, 1958

= Marpissa obtusa =

Species of spider

Marpissa obtusa is a species of jumping spider. It is found in the United States.
