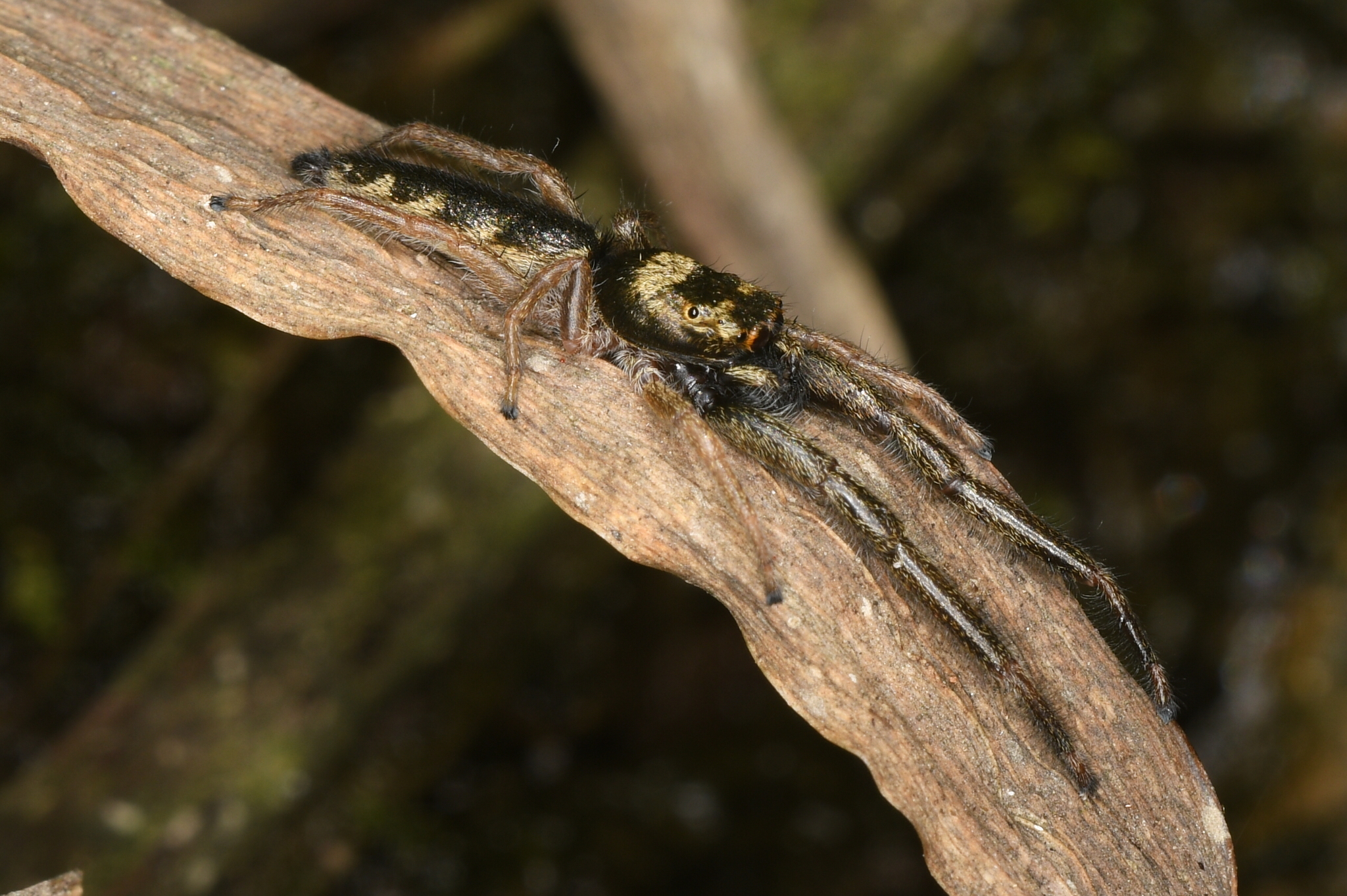

Scientific classification
- Kingdom: Animalia
- Phylum: Arthropoda
- Subphylum: Chelicerata
- Class: Arachnida
- Order: Araneae
- Infraorder: Araneomorphae
- Family: Salticidae
- Genus: Marpissa
- Species: M. robusta

Binomial name
- Marpissa robusta (Banks, 1906)

= Marpissa robusta =

Species of spider

Marpissa robusta is a species of jumping spider in the family Salticidae. It is found in the western United States.
