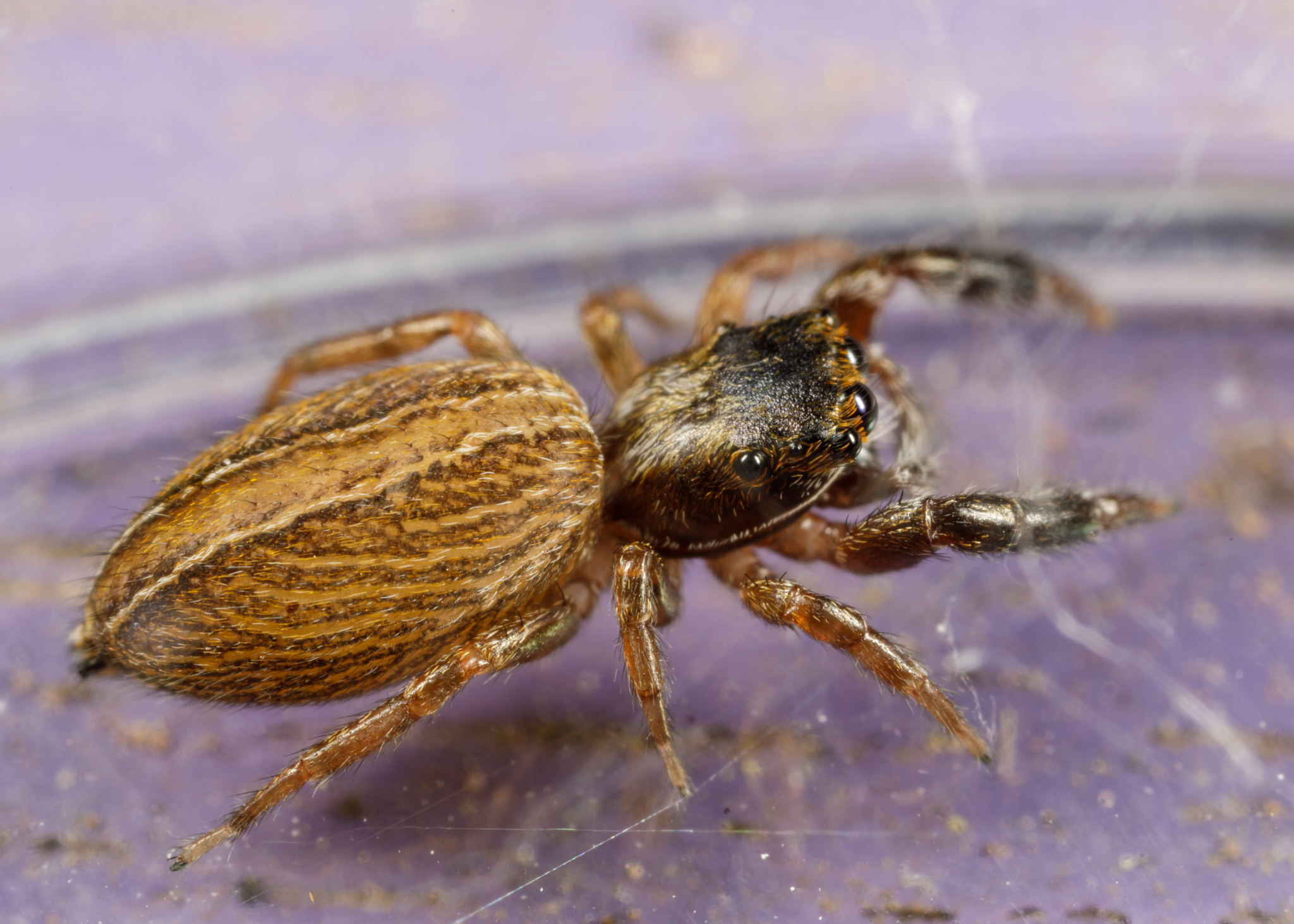
- female from Texas
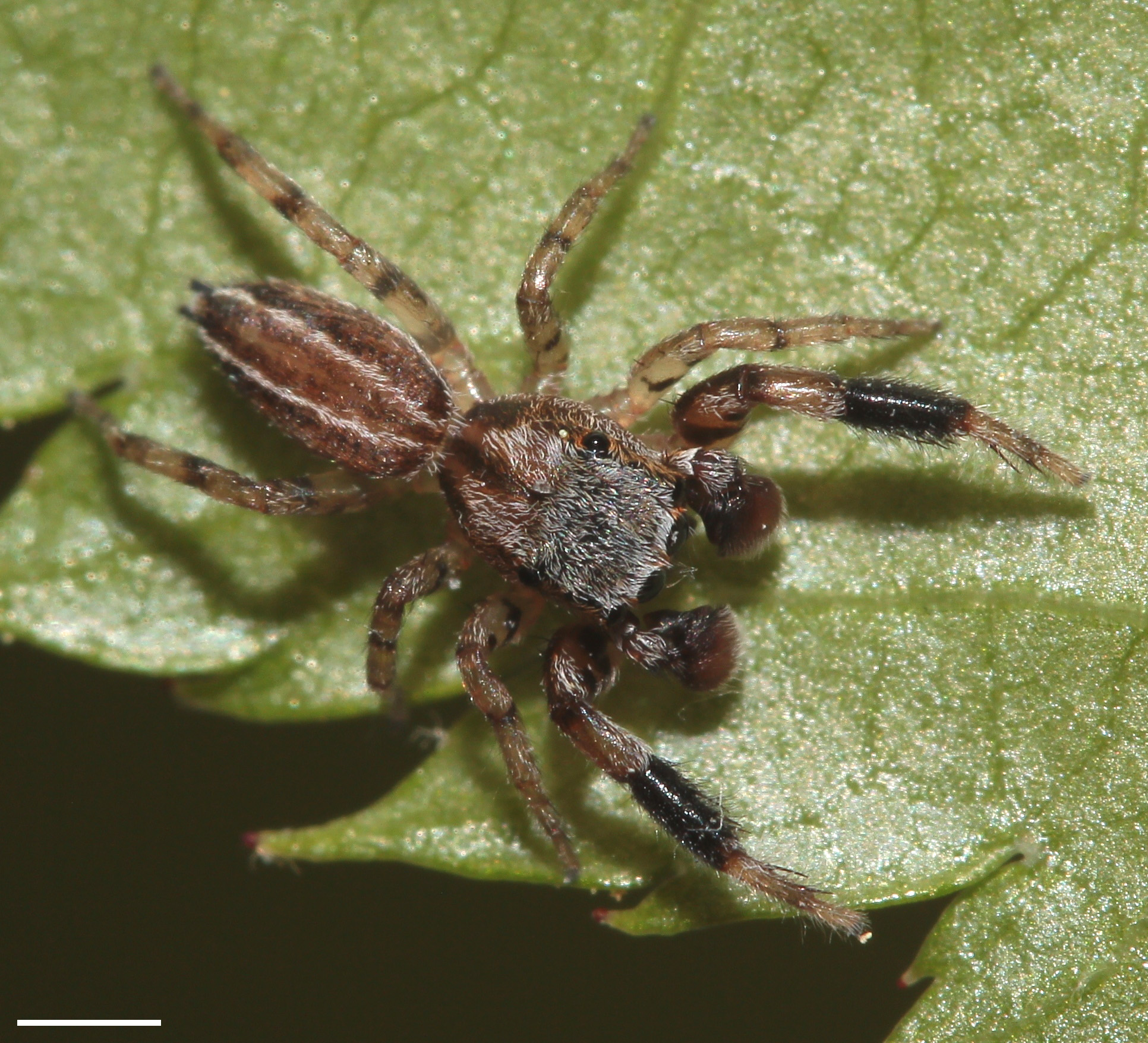
- Male from South Carolina

Scientific classification
- Kingdom: Animalia
- Phylum: Arthropoda
- Subphylum: Chelicerata
- Class: Arachnida
- Order: Araneae
- Infraorder: Araneomorphae
- Family: Salticidae
- Genus: Marpissa
- Species: M. lineata

Binomial name
- Marpissa lineata (C. L. Koch, 1846)

Synonyms
- Maevia lineata C. L. Koch, 1846; Attus quadrilineatus Peckham & Peckham, 1883; Icius lineatus Peckham & Peckham, 1888; Menemerus lineatus Emerton, 1891; Fuentes lineata Simon, 1903; Onondaga lineata Peckham & Peckham, 1909

= Marpissa lineata =

Four-lined Slender Jumping Spider

Species of spider

Marpissa lineata is a species of jumping spider in the family Salticidae. It is found in Canada and the United States.

== Etymology ==
The species name lineata is Latin for "lined" or "striped", referring to the distinctive banded markings on the opisthosoma and legs.

== Distribution ==
M. lineata is widely distributed across the eastern half of North America. It has been recorded from numerous locations including Massachusetts, New York, New Jersey, Georgia, Mississippi, Tennessee, Missouri, Illinois, and Michigan. It also appears in Canada. The species is apparently displaced by M. sulcosa in Florida and along the southern coast.

== Habitat ==
This small spider is common in leaf mould in forest and shrub communities. It is also reported as a common member of the litter population in prairie grass communities.

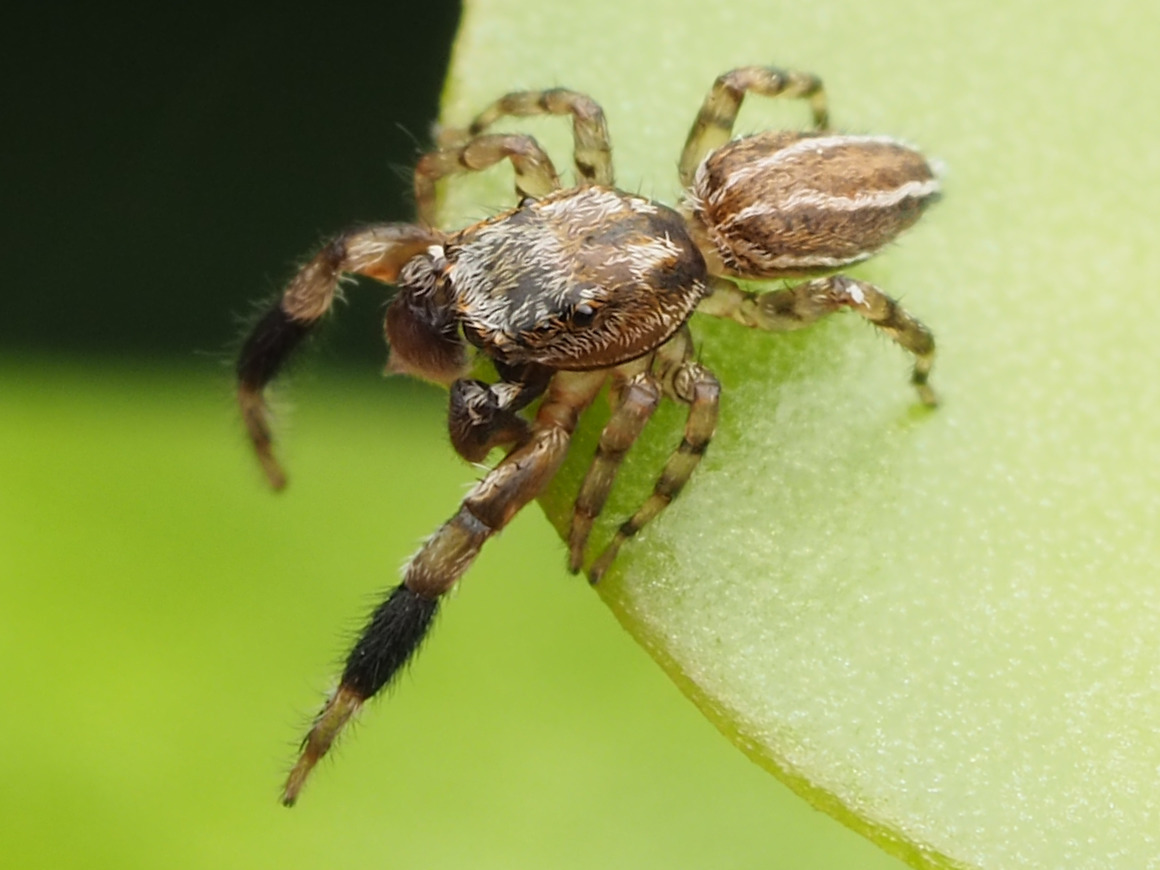

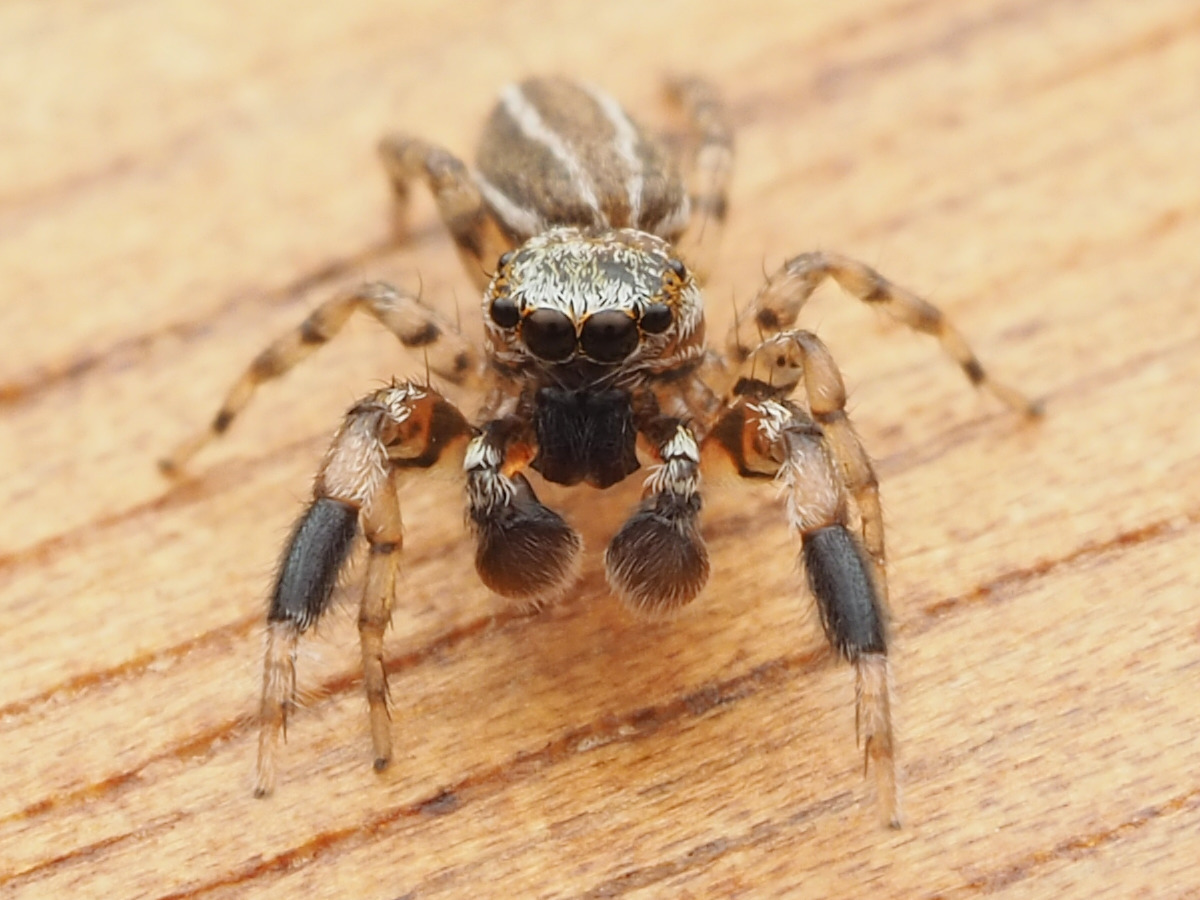

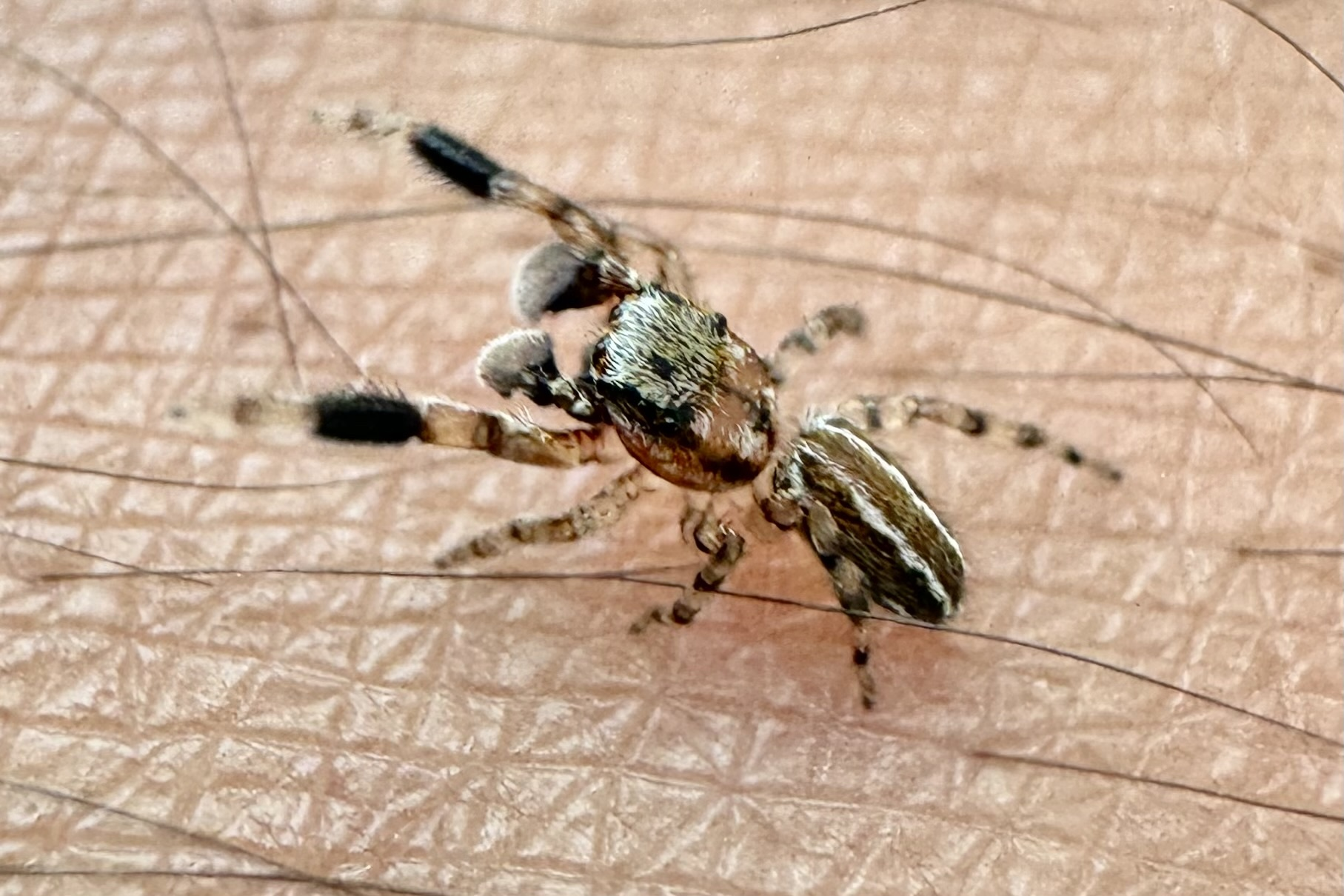

== Description ==
=== Females ===
Females are larger than males, with a total length of 3.50–5.20 mm compared to males at 3.00–4.00 mm.

They have a brown carapace margined with a thin black band. The eyes are surrounded with black coloration. The chelicerae are brown, while the labium and maxillae are brown with pale tips. The sternum and leg coxae are yellow. The legs are predominantly yellow, though the first femur and tibia are dark. The remaining legs show femora with ventral proximal black spots and distal dark bands, while the tibiae are dark both distally and proximally, and the metatarsi are dark distally.

The opisthosoma displays a distinctive pattern with a median dark band that is narrow at the anterior end and becomes broader posteriorly. In some specimens, this band may be bifurcated in the posterior half, forming an elongated inverted Y shape. This median band is flanked on each side by a narrow pale stripe. The remainder of the dorsum and sides are covered by narrow, closely spaced dark bands. The ventral surface is dark with a pair of pale median bands and a pair of pale lateral bands.

=== Males ===
Male (1848 drawing)

Males share similar coloration and markings with females, though they may have solid brown first legs with no dark bands on the remaining pale legs. Males possess a distinctive broad tibial apophysis on the pedipalp with a shallow notch, which is a key identifying feature.

The cephalothorax gently slopes to and behind the posterior eyes. The width of the carapace is three-quarters of its length, and the height is approximately three-fifths of the width. The first legs are twice as heavy as the remaining legs, and the abdomen is only slightly longer than the carapace.
