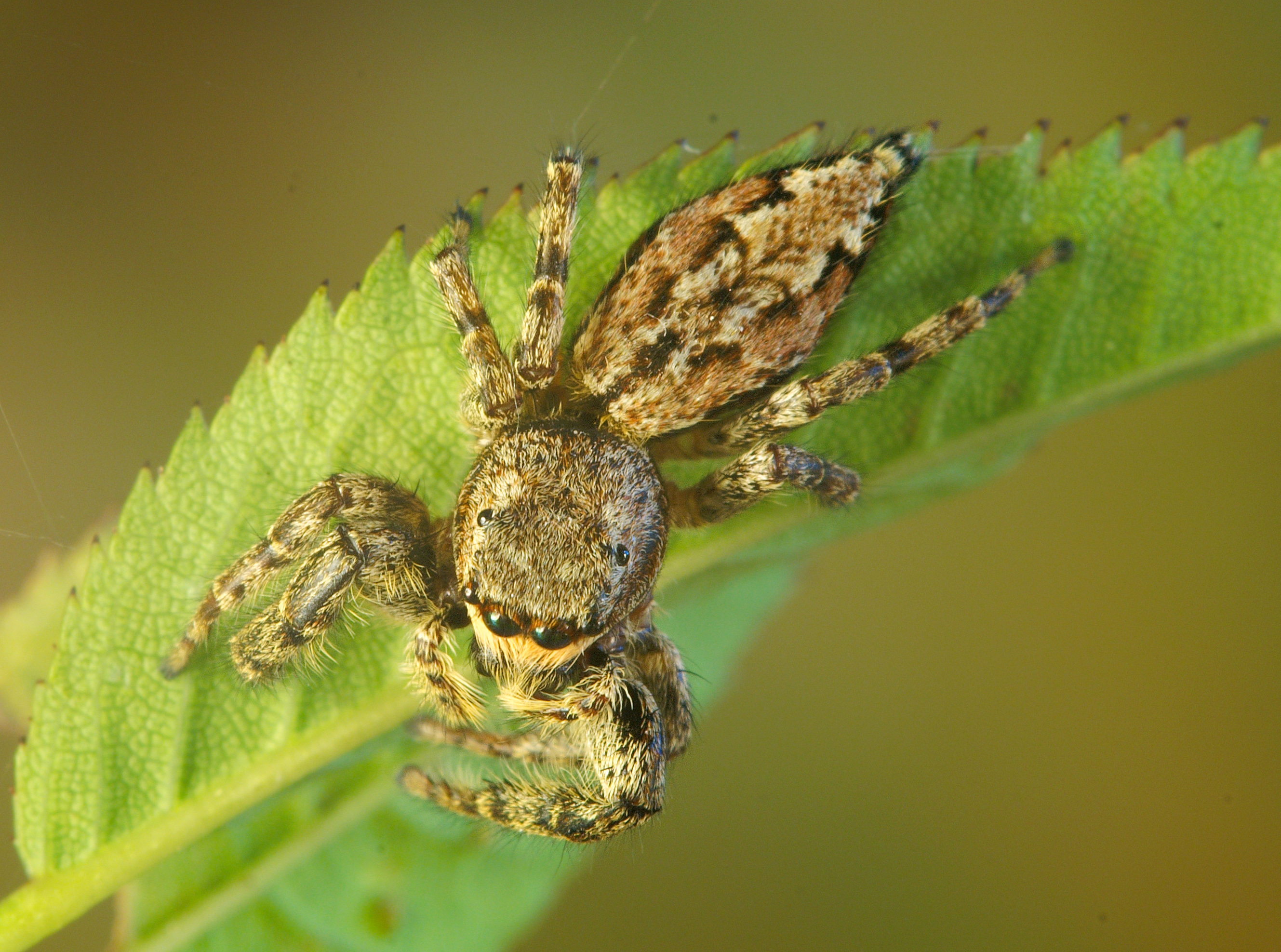
- Marpissa muscosa

Scientific classification
- Kingdom: Animalia
- Phylum: Arthropoda
- Subphylum: Chelicerata
- Class: Arachnida
- Order: Araneae
- Infraorder: Araneomorphae
- Family: Salticidae
- Subfamily: Salticinae
- Genus: Marpissa; C. L. Koch, 1846

Type species
- M. muscosa (Clerck, 1757)

Species
- 41, see text

Synonyms
- Hyctia Simon, 1876; Icidella Bösenberg & Strand, 1906; Roeweriella Kratochvíl, 1932

= Marpissa =

Genus of spiders

Marpissa is a genus of jumping spiders that was first described by Carl Ludwig Koch in 1846.

== Species ==
As of July 2024 it contains forty-one species, found in North America, South America, Africa, Europe, Asia, on the Polynesian Islands, and the Greater Antilles:

- Marpissa agricola (G. W. Peckham & E. G. Peckham, 1894) – Brazil
- Marpissa armifera Urquhart, 1892 – New Zealand
- Marpissa balcanica (Kratochvíl, 1932) – Croatia
- Marpissa bina (Hentz, 1846) – United States
- Marpissa bryantae (Jones, 1945) – United States
- Marpissa carinata Butt & Beg, 2000 – Pakistan
- Marpissa dayapurensis Majumder, 2004 – India
- Marpissa dentoides Barnes, 1958 – United States
- Marpissa formosa (Banks, 1892) – United States
- Marpissa fornicis (Dyal, 1935) – Pakistan
- Marpissa gangasagarensis Majumder, 2005 – India
- Marpissa grata (Gertsch, 1936) – United States
- Marpissa hieroglyphica Taczanowski, 1878 – Peru
- Marpissa insignis Butt & Beg, 2000 – Pakistan
- Marpissa kalighatensis B. Biswas & K. Biswas, 1992 – India
- Marpissa lineata (C. L. Koch, 1846) – United States
- Marpissa linzhiensis Hu, 2001 – China
- Marpissa longiuscula (Simon, 1871) – Ukraine
- Marpissa mashibarai Baba, 2013 – Korea, Japan
- Marpissa melanura F. O. Pickard-Cambridge, 1901 – Guatemala
- Marpissa milleri (G. W. Peckham & E. G. Peckham, 1894) – Russia (Far East), China, Korea, Japan
- Marpissa mirabilis Butt & Beg, 2000 – Pakistan
- Marpissa muscosa (Clerck, 1757) – Europe, Turkey, Caucasus, Russia (Europe to Middle Siberia)
- Marpissa mystacina Taczanowski, 1878 – Peru
- Marpissa nivoyi (Lucas, 1846) – Europe, Morocco, Algeria, Turkey, Caucasus, Iran, Russia (Europe) to Central Asia
- Marpissa nutanae B. Biswas & K. Biswas, 1984 – India
- Marpissa obtusa Barnes, 1958 – United States
- Marpissa pikei (G. W. Peckham & E. G. Peckham, 1888) – United States, Mexico, Cuba
- Marpissa pomatia (Walckenaer, 1802) – Europe, Turkey, Caucasus, Russia (Europe to Far East), Central Asia, Afghanistan, China, Korea, Japan
- Marpissa prathamae B. Biswas & K. Biswas, 1984 – India
- Marpissa proszynskii Biswas & Begum, 1999 – Bangladesh
- Marpissa pulla (Karsch, 1879) – Russia (Far East), China, Taiwan, Korea, Japan
- Marpissa radiata (Grube, 1859) – Europe, Turkey, Caucasus, Russia (Europe to South Siberia), Kazakhstan
- Marpissa raimondi Taczanowski, 1878 – Peru
- Marpissa robusta (Banks, 1906) – United States
- Marpissa rubriceps Mello-Leitão, 1922 – Brazil
- Marpissa soricina (Thorell, 1899) – Cameroon
- Marpissa sulcosa Barnes, 1958 – United States
- Marpissa tenebrosa Butt & Beg, 2000 – Pakistan
- Marpissa yawatai Baba, 2013 – Japan
- Marpissa zaitzevi Mcheidze, 1997 – Georgia
