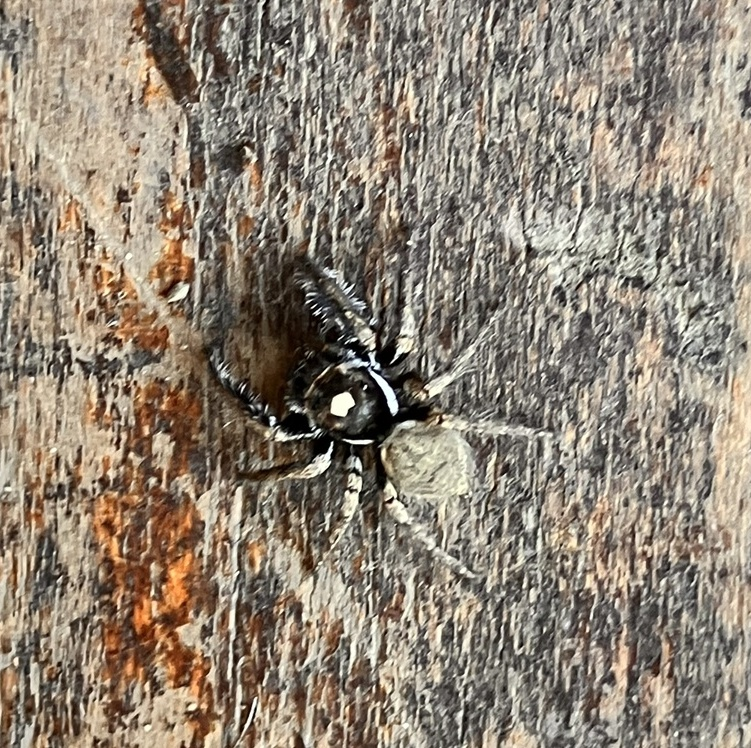

Scientific classification
- Kingdom: Animalia
- Phylum: Arthropoda
- Subphylum: Chelicerata
- Class: Arachnida
- Order: Araneae
- Infraorder: Araneomorphae
- Family: Salticidae
- Genus: Pignus
- Species: P. pongola

Binomial name
- Pignus pongola Wesołowska & Haddad, 2009

= Pignus pongola =

Species of spider

Pignus pongola is a species of jumping spider in the genus Pignus that lives in South Africa. The species was first described in 2009 by Wanda Wesołowska and Charles Haddad. It thrives in Mediterranean forests, woodlands, and scrub, including forest near rivers and coasts like fynbos. The spider is medium-sized, with a carapace that measures typically 3.6 mm (0.14 in) long and an abdomen 3.4 mm (0.13 in) long. It has a pattern similar to members of the Philaeus genus, to which Pignus is related. The most mouthparts are distinctive. While the chelicerae are similar in some respects to other species in the genus, they have a unique shape, being particularly large with a single long fang. The male's copulatory organs are also unusual. The palpal bulb has an unusually shaped tegulum, out of which extends a long thin embolus that curves up the bulb to its end. The female has not been described.

== Taxonomy ==
Pignus pongola is a species of jumping spider that was first described by Wanda Wesołowska and Charles Haddad in 2009. It was one of over 500 species identified by the Polish arachnologist Wesołowska during her career, making her one of the most prolific authors in the field. They allocated it to the genus Pignus, first circumscribed by Wesołowska in 2000. She named it for a Latin word that can be translated "hostage". The species is named after the area where it was first discovered.

The spider has some superficial similarities with the genus Philaeus, particularly the shape of its body and the pattern visible on its surface. This relationship had been reinforced in 2008, when the genus Pignus was made a member of the group Philaeus, along with the genera Mogrus, Philaeus and Tusitala. More detailed analysis of protein-coding genes showed that the spider was particularly related to Tusitala. The group was allocated to the subfamily Salticinae in 2014. In Wayne Maddison's 2015 study of spider phylogenetic classification, the genus Pignus was allocated to the tribe Salticini. Species in the tribe primarily live in Africa, although some have also been found in Asia, Europe and North America. The tribe is a member of the clade Saltafresia in the clade Salticoida. In 2017, Prószyński named Pignus as part of a group of genera named Hyllines, named after the genus Hyllus, along with 39 other genera based on similarities in the spiders' copulatory organs.

== Description ==
Pignus pongola is a medium-sized spider with distinctive characteristics. The spider's body is divided into two main parts: a larger oval cephalothorax and a smaller oval abdomen. The male has a carapace, the hard upper part of the cephalothorax, that is typically 3.6 mm (0.14 in) long and 3 mm (0.12 in) wide. The upperside of the carapace is dark brown with a pair of broad white streaks made of light hair on its side. The spider's eye field is darker but has reddish-orange scales towards the front, a light triangular patch towards the back and a scattering of brown bristles across its surface. There are light patches of reddish-orange scales near the rearmost eyes. The underside of the cephalothorax, or sternum, is orange. The spider's face, or clypeus, is very low and has a scattering of white hairs. There are two thin parallel lines on its cheeks. Its mouthparts are distinctive. The chelicerae are of similar form to other members of the genus but are unique in shape. They are dark brown, with a metallic sheen, and very large, more than related species. A long fang is visible. There are two teeth to the front and one large tooth to the back, close to the base of the fang. The labium and maxillae are brown with yellow tips.

The male spider's abdomen measures typically 3.4 mm (0.13 in) in length and 2.4 mm (0.09 in) in width. It is marked with an irregular pattern on its top surface, consisting of a central light patch that contains two dark dots and a series of closely tessellating lighter chevrons that get gradually smaller as they get closer to the back of the spider. The front quadrant also has a characteristic lighter shade to the sides. The top is generally brownish-grey and has a few long bristles scattered on its surface. The underside is dark marked with a pattern of four lines of white dots. The spider has light brown spinnerets. Its legs are brown and orange with dense, mainly dark brown hairs, although these are occasionally interrupted by white hairs. The pedipalps are small, brownish and covered in long hairs.

The spider has distinctive copulatory organs. The male has a convex palpal bulb that has a distinctively-shaped large tegulum that covers much of its lower parts. The tegulum is generally semi-circular and has a curved appendage, or apophysis, that curls back on itself. Out of this tegulum extends a very long and thin embolus that initially curves down and then follows the palpal bulb to its end. There are small number of short hairs on the bulb. The palpal tibia has a larger number of long hairs and has a long narrow protrusion, or tibial apophysis that proceeds from it, extending alongside the palpal bulb. It is the shape of the tegulum, as well as the chelicerae, that most distinguish the species. The female has not been described.

== Distribution and habitat ==
Pignus spiders live in East and Southern Africa. Pignus pongola is endemic to South Africa. The male holotype was discovered in 2006 in the floodplain of the Pongola River. It has been subsequently been identified as living in other areas of the country. The first examples living in KwaZulu-Natal were found in Tembe Elephant Park in 2003, while others were discovered in iSimangaliso Wetland Park in 2012. In the meantime, the first to be identified living in Western Cape had been found inside the De Hoop Nature Reserve during 2005.

The spider was first seen living in riparian forest, areas of dominated by trees near to rivers. It thrives in Mediterranean forests, woodlands, and scrub. It has particularly been found in coastal forests, particularly areas of Trichilia emetica, and fynbos. It has also been found in the transition areas between cultivated and wild forests. One example was seen living on the edge of a plantation of Eucalyptus trees.
