= Mogrus portentosus =

Scientific classification
- Kingdom: Animalia
- Phylum: Arthropoda
- Subphylum: Chelicerata
- Class: Arachnida
- Order: Araneae
- Infraorder: Araneomorphae
- Family: Salticidae
- Genus: Mogrus
- Species: M. portentosus

Binomial name
- Mogrus portentosus Wesołowska & van Harten, 1994

Species of spider

Mogrus portentosus is a species of jumping spider in the genus Mogrus that is endemic to Yemen. The spider was first described in 1994 by Wanda Wesołowska and Antonius van Harten. It is brown with a carapace that is between 2.3 and 2.7 mm (0.091 and 0.106 in) and an abdomen that is between 2.3 and 3.5 mm (0.091 and 0.138 in) long. The female is larger than the male. The spider resembles the related Mogrus fulvovittatus, particularly the female, which can only be clearly differentiated by looking the internal structure of its epigyne. The male is also distinguished by its copulatory organs. It has a distinctive loop on the end of its embolus and a bulbous base to its single tibial apophysis, or spike.

== Taxonomy ==
Mogrus portentosus is a jumping spider that was first described by Wanda Wesołowska and Antonius van Harten in 1994. They allocated the species to the genus Mogrus, first raised by Eugène Simon in 1882. In Wayne Maddison's 2015 study of spider phylogenetic classification, the genus Mogrus was placed in the clade Simonida within the subfamily Saltafresia. He considered that it a member of the tribe Salticini. Two years later, in 2017, Jerzy Prószyński grouped the genus with nine other genera of jumping spiders under the name Hyllines, which was named after the genus Hyllus. He used the shape of the embolus as a distinguishing sign for the group. Hyllines was itself tentatively placed within a supergroup named Hylloida.

== Description ==
The species is small and is superficially very similar to Mogrus fulvovittatus. The male has a convex brown carapace that is typically 2.3 mm (0.091 in) long and between 1.7 mm (0.067 in) wide. It has a covering of long brown hairs apart from two stripes down the middle made of white hairs. The eye field is short. The clypeus is also covered in white hairs. The chelicerae are brown while the labium and sternum are yellow. The abdomen is typically 2.3 mm (0.091 in) long and 1.2 mm (0.047 in) wide. Brown on the top, lined with two large white stripes to he ends, and yellow underneath, the entire abdomen has a dense covering of long brown and light hairs. The spinnerets are yellowish-grey. The legs are yellowish with long spines and brown hairs. The pedipalps are yellowish-brown. The palpal bulb has a single straight tibial apophysis, or spike, that has a bump at its base. The embolus. Is long and thin, with a loop on its tip.

The female is similar to the male. It is slightly larger, with a carapace that is typically 2.7 mm (0.11 in) long and 2.1 mm (0.083 in) wide and an abdomen typically 3.5 mm (0.14 in) long and 1.9 mm (0.075 in) wide. Otherwise, the sexes look similar. The female has a large epigyne that has a depression that is semi-crescent in shape. Internally, the copulatory organs are more complex that other spiders in the genus. The copulatory openings lead to long winding insemination ducts and large spermathecae. Accessory glands are clearly visible. The spider can be easily distinguished from others in the genus by the shape of the male embolus, especially the characteristic loop at the tip, and the way that the base of the spike on the tibia is bulbous. The female is especially similar to Mogrus fulvovittatus, and only the internal structure of the epigyne tells it apart. This led to the authors deciding that one of the examples they thought was a member of this species was actually Mogrus praecinctus.

== Distribution ==
Mogrus portentosus is endemic to Yemen. The holotype was discovered between Mokha and Khochna in 1992. Other examples have been found in other areas of the country, from Aden to Zinjibar. The spider is known to live in areas of human habitation and some examples have been found in cotton fields.
