= Mogrus mirabilis =

Scientific classification
- Kingdom: Animalia
- Phylum: Arthropoda
- Subphylum: Chelicerata
- Class: Arachnida
- Order: Araneae
- Infraorder: Araneomorphae
- Family: Salticidae
- Genus: Mogrus
- Species: M. mirabilis

Binomial name
- Mogrus mirabilis Wesołowska & van Harten, 1994

Species of spider

Mogrus mirabilis is a species of jumping spider in the genus Mogrus that has been found in Egypt, Iraq, Jordan, Saudi Arabia, Sudan and Yemen. The spider was first defined in 1994 by Wanda Wesołowska and Antonius Van Harten. The female has a dark brown carapace that is typically 3.0 mm (0.12 in) and a greyish-white abdomen that is typically 4.7 mm (0.19 in) long. The male is significantly smaller and lighter, with a brownish-yellow carapace that is typically 2.38 mm (0.094 in) long and a yellow abdomen typically 2.5 mm (0.098 in) long. The male is similar to Mogrus antoninus, Mogrus frontosus and Mogrus logunovi, differing in the structure of its copulatory organs, particularly its bent tibial apophysis. The female is almost indistinguishable from Mogrus fulvovittatus, differing only in the structure of the epigyne. It is so similar to Mogrus sinaicus that Dmitri Logunov speculated that the two are the same species, although they have not been formally declared to be synonyms.

== Taxonomy ==
Mogrus mirabilis is a jumping spider that was first described by Wanda Wesołowska and Antonius Van Harten in 1994. It is one of over 500 species identified by the Polish arachnologist Wesołowska during her career. They allocated the species to the genus Mogrus, first raised by Eugène Simon in 1882. It is likely to be synonymous with Mogrus sinaicus, first described in by Jerzy Prószyński in 2000.

In Wayne Maddison's 2015 study of spider phylogenetic classification, the genus Mogrus was placed in the clade Simonida within the subfamily Saltafresia. He considered that it a member of the tribe Salticini. Two years later, in 2017, Jerzy Prószyński grouped the genus with nine other genera of jumping spiders under the name Hyllines, which was named after the genus Hyllus. He used the shape of the embolus as a distinguishing sign for the group. Hyllines was itself tentatively placed within a supergroup named Hylloida.

== Description ==
The male and the female of the species differ substantially. The male has a brownish-yellow carapace, or hard shell on the top of the cephalothorax, that is typically 2.38 mm (0.094 in) long and 1.7 mm (0.067 in) wide. It has wide yellow stripes on its edges. The underside of the cephalothorax, or sternum, is yellow The eye field is black. The clypeus is yellowish with a covering of scales the colour of sand. The chelicerae are brownish and the labium is yellow. The abdomen is greyish-yellow on the top with wide broken brownish band down the middle. It is typically 2.5 mm (0.098 in) long and 1.53 mm (0.060 in) wide. The sides and bottom of the abdomen are yellow, as are the spinnerets and the legs, which have a covering of straw-coloured hairs. The pedipalps are yellow and the palpal bulb is brown. It has a narrow cymbium and long bent tibial apophysis, that thins towards its sharp tip. The spider has a long thin embolus.

The female is larger than the male. It has a carapace that is typically 3.0 mm (0.12 in) long and 2.3 mm (0.091 in) wide and an abdomen typically 4.7 mm (0.19 in) long and 3.2 mm (0.13 in) wide. The carapace is dark brown and the eye field is black. There are long brown bristles on the eye field with white hairs near the eyes. There are also white hairs that form two patches on the carapace sides. The clypeus is low with scarce white hairs. The chelicerae is dark brown with a single tooth to the front and two to the back. The labium is also dark brown. The sternum are brown. The abdomen is greyish white on top, with a brown stripe down the middle of the back third. The underside is light with traces of three dark stripes along its length. The spinnerets are light grey and legs orange. The epigyne is generally featureless on the outside, with copulatory ducts that lead to swollen insemination ducts that are reminiscent of large ovoid chambers and narrow bean-shaped receptacles.

The spider is similar to others in the genus. The male has similarities for Mogrus antoninus, which lives in Central Asia, Mogrus frontosus that comes from Corsica and Mogrus logunovi that is found in Jordan and Israel. It can be distinguished by the position of the bulging tegular apophysis, which is to the side rather than near the top, and, particularly, by the larger bent and sharp tibial apophysis. The female is almost indistinguishable from Mogrus sinaicus, the epigynes of the two species being nearly identical. It is also related to Mogrus fulvovittatus, differing only in the internal structure of the epigyne. The females first identified in Saudi Arabia were initially thought to be a possible match for male of that species.

== Distribution ==
Mogrus mirabilis lives in Egypt, Iraq, Jordan, Saudi Arabia, Sudan and Yemen. The holotype was discovered between Qatabah and Aden in Yemen in 1993. Examples have been found in the Al Mahwit and Lahij Governorates. The first male example was found near Wadi Hanifa in Sudan in 1964. Examples in Saudi Arabia were found near Wadi Hanifa in 1978, Hakimah in 1980 and Khasm Khafs in 1980. The species has also been found near the Siwa Oasis in Egypt. In 1982, an example was discovered in the Sinai Peninsula. In 1986, the spider was first collected in Iraq, near Baiji. The first example in Jordan was discovered at Wadi Rum near the border with Saudi Arabia in 2004. These were identified as being examples of the species in 2015.
