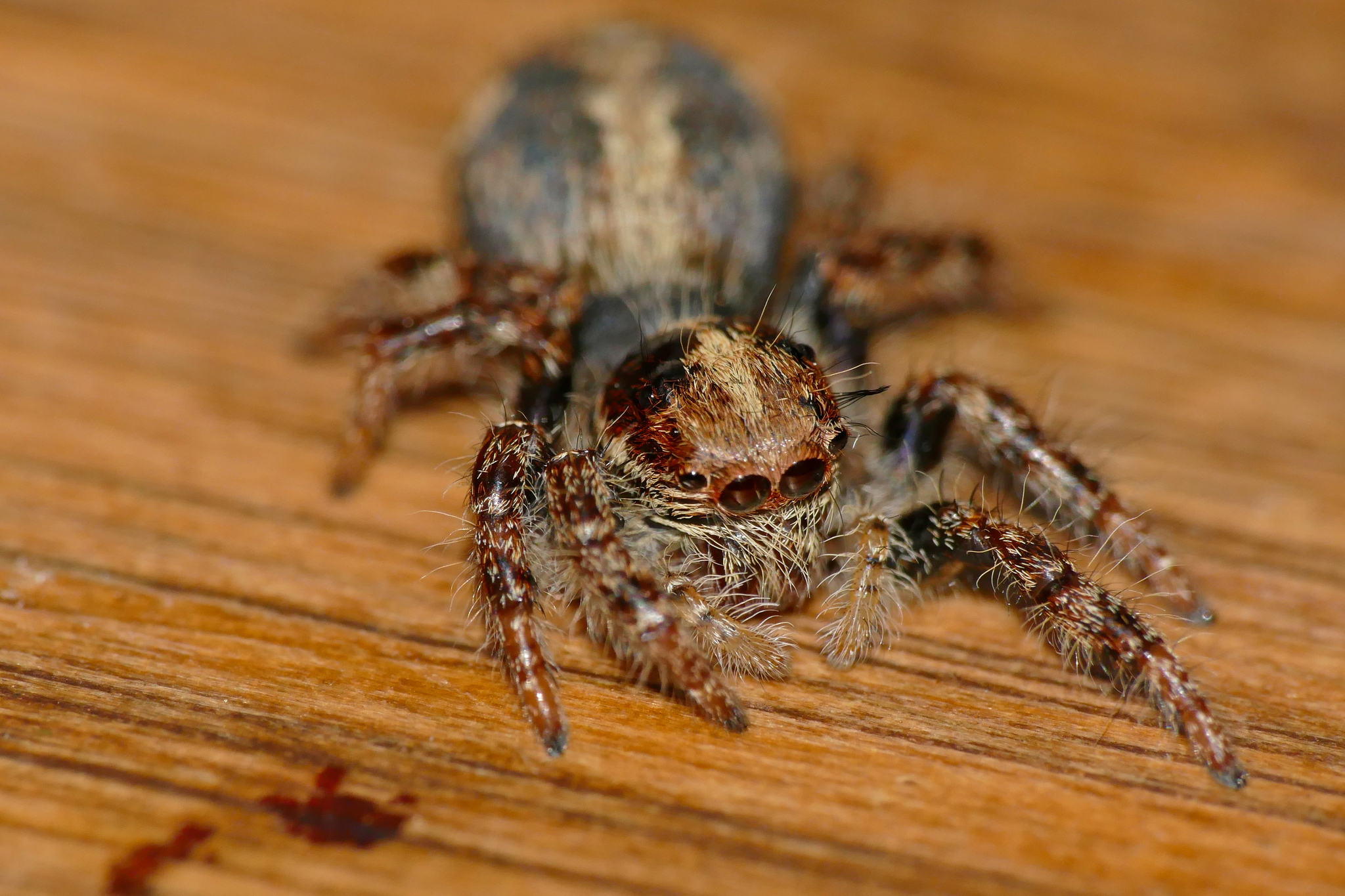
- female P. simoni
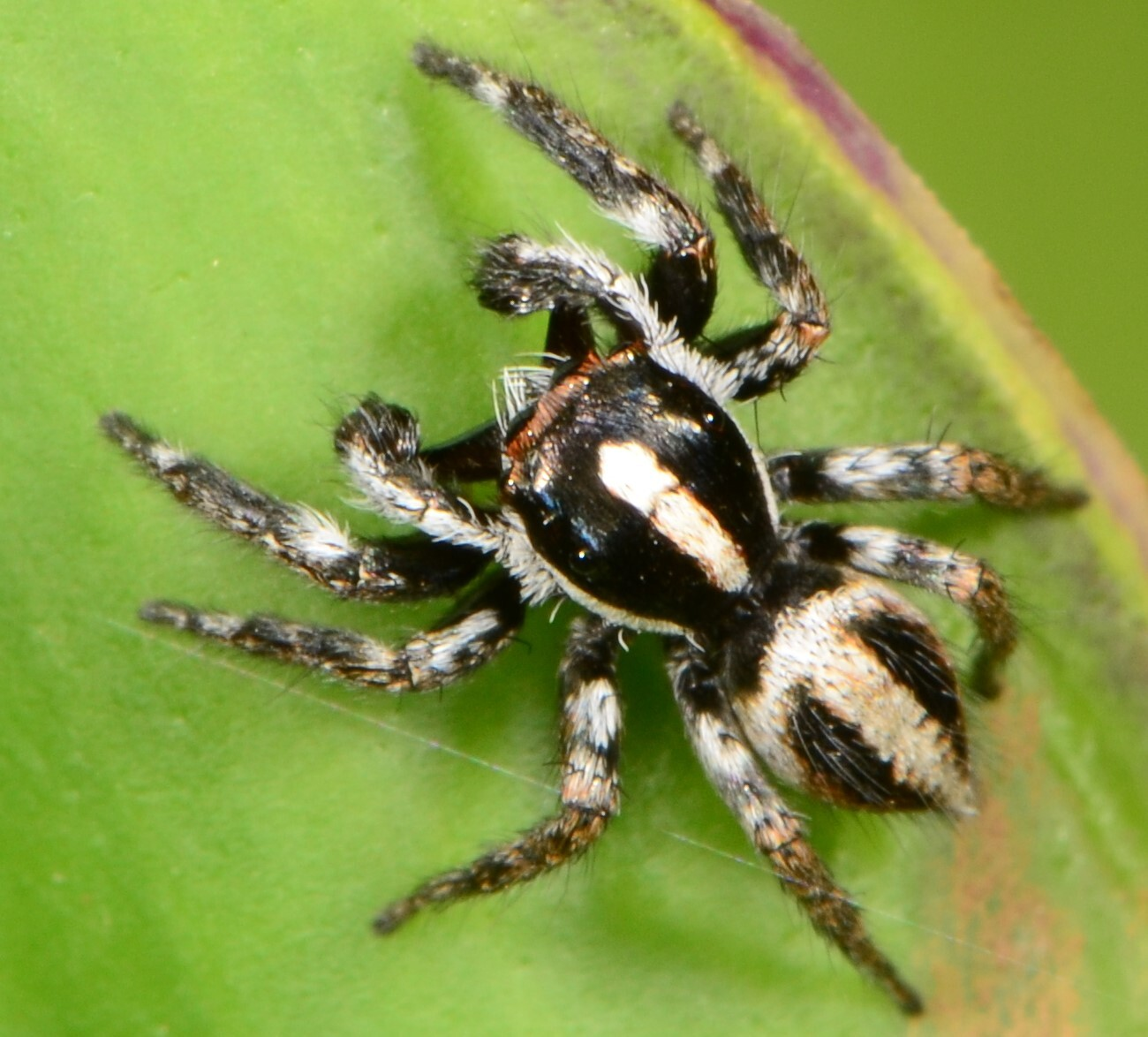
- male P. simoni

Scientific classification
- Kingdom: Animalia
- Phylum: Arthropoda
- Subphylum: Chelicerata
- Class: Arachnida
- Order: Araneae
- Infraorder: Araneomorphae
- Family: Salticidae
- Subfamily: Salticinae
- Genus: Pignus; Wesolowska, 2000

Type species
- P. simoni (Peckham & Peckham, 1903)

Species
- P. lautissimum Wesolowska & Russell-Smith, 2000; P. pongola Wesolowska & Haddad, 2009; P. simoni (Peckham & Peckham, 1903)

= Pignus =

Genus of spiders

Pignus is a genus of African jumping spiders that was first described by Wanda Wesołowska in 2000.

== Species ==
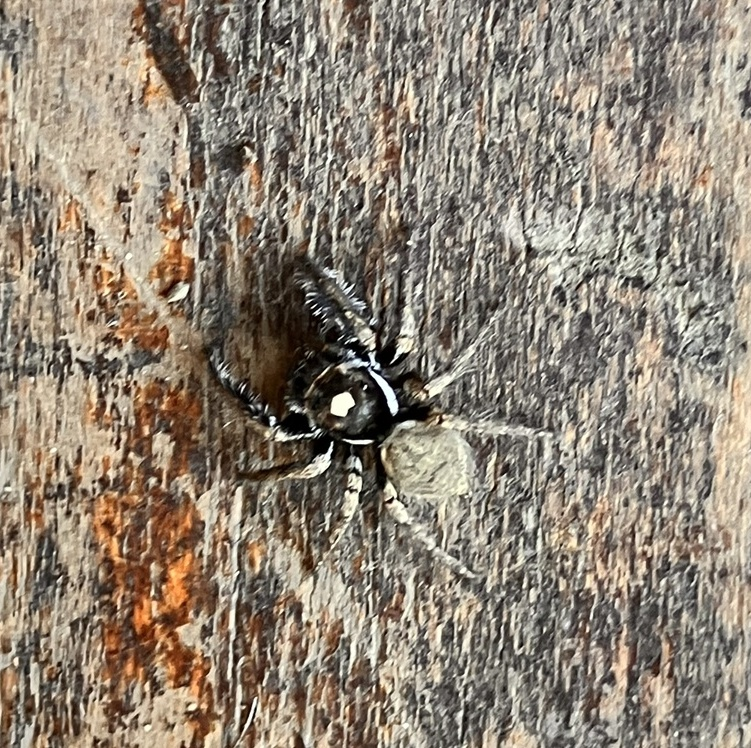
P. pongola

As of October 2025, this genus includes three species:

- Pignus lautissimum Wesołowska & Russell-Smith, 2000 – Tanzania
- Pignus pongola Wesołowska & Haddad, 2009 – South Africa
- Pignus simoni (G. W. Peckham & E. G. Peckham, 1903) – Zimbabwe, Mozambique, South Africa (type species)
