= Tusitala unica =

Scientific classification
- Kingdom: Animalia
- Phylum: Arthropoda
- Subphylum: Chelicerata
- Class: Arachnida
- Order: Araneae
- Infraorder: Araneomorphae
- Family: Salticidae
- Genus: Tusitala
- Species: T. unica

Binomial name
- Tusitala unica Wesołowska & Russell-Smith, 2000

Species of jumping spider

Tusitala unica is a species of jumping spider that lives in Tanzania. A member of the genus Tusitala, its name is a Latin word that means “unique”. First described in 2000, it is typically 7 mm (0.28 in) long. The female spider has a dark brown carapace, the hard upper part of its front section, and, behind that, a brownish-russet abdomen that is marked with a yellowish pattern. Its legs are light brown. It has complex copulatory organs with winding insemination ducts and bean-like receptacles, or spermathecae, and larger accessory glands. The male has not been identified.

== Taxonomy and etymology ==
Tusitala unica is a species of jumping spider, a member of the family Salticidae, that was first described by the arachnologists Wanda Wesołowska and Anthony Russell-Smith in 2000. It was one of over 500 species that Wesołowska identified during her career. The holotype is stored at the Royal Museum for Central Africa in Tervuren. It is named for a Latin word that means “unique”. They allocated it to the genus Tusitala, first circumscribed by George and Elizabeth Peckham in 1902. In Wayne Maddison's 2015 study of spider phylogenetic classification, the genus Tusitala was listed in the tribe Salticini. This is a member of the clade Saltafresia. Maddison placed this tribe in the subclade Simonida. Jerzy Prószyński placed the genus in an informal group called Hyllines in 2017.

== Description ==
The female Tusitala unica has a dark brown carapace, the hard upper part of its front section, that is typically 3.5 mm (0.14 in) in length and typically 2.6 mm (0.10 in) wide. It has a dense covering of brown hairs apart from its sides, which have white hairs on them that form stripes. The area near its eyes is black with brown bristles near the eyes themselves. The part of its face known as its clypeus is also brown. The underside of its carapace, known as its sternum, is lighter brown. Its mouthparts, including its labium and maxillae, are brown with light tips and its chelicerae have two teeth visible at the front and a double tooth at the back.

Behind its carapace, the spider has an abdomen, also typically measuring 3.5 mm in length but slightly narrower at 2.5 mm (0.10 in) wide. It is brownish-russet and has a yellowish pattern on its top. Underneath, it is darker. The spider also has yellowish-brown spinnerets that it uses to spin webs. Its legs are light brown and have brown hairs and spines. They have dark hairy rings on their femora Its epigyne, the external visible part of the female's copulatory organs, is trapezoidal and typical for the genus. Its internal structure Is complex. There are two copulatory openings that lead, via winding insemination ducts, to bean-like receptacles, or spermathecae. There are also large accessory glands. The male has not been described.

== Distribution and habitat ==
Tusitala spiders can be found across Africa. Tusitala unica is endemic to Tanzania. The holotype was found in Mkomazi National Park in 1996 on grassy tussocks near a water pool.
