= Mogrus cognatus =

Scientific classification
- Kingdom: Animalia
- Phylum: Arthropoda
- Subphylum: Chelicerata
- Class: Arachnida
- Order: Araneae
- Infraorder: Araneomorphae
- Family: Salticidae
- Genus: Mogrus
- Species: M. cognatus

Binomial name
- Mogrus cognatus Wesołowska & van Harten, 1994

Species of spider

Mogrus cognatus is a species of jumping spider in the genus Mogrus that lives in United Arab Emirates and Yemen. The spider was first defined in 1994 by Wanda Wesołowska and Anthonius Van Harten. It is a small spider. The male has a dark brown or fawn-brownish carapace that range between 2.6 and 2.8 mm (0.10 and 0.11 in) long and a yellow-white or dark brown abdomen between 2.7 and 3.1 mm (0.11 and 0.12 in) long. The female has not been described. The spider is similar to the related Mogrus fulvovittatus, but can be distinguished by its copulatory organs. It has a long thin embolus that encircles the palpal bulb and has a distinctive membrane at its base.

== Taxonomy ==
Mogrus cognatus is a jumping spider that was first described by Wanda Wesołowska and Anthonius Van Harten in 1994. It is one of over 500 species identified by the Polish arachnologist Wesołowska during her career. They allocated the species to the genus Mogrus, first raised by Eugène Simon in 1882. In Wayne Maddison's 2015 study of spider phylogenetic classification, the genus Mogrus was placed in the clade Simonida within the subfamily Saltafresia. He considered that it a member of the tribe Salticini. Two years later, in 2017, Jerzy Prószyński grouped the genus with nine other genera of jumping spiders under the name Hyllines, which was named after the genus Hyllus. He used the shape of the embolus as a distinguishing sign for the group. Hyllines was itself tentatively placed within a supergroup named Hylloida.

== Description ==
The species is small. The male has a high cephalothorax that is between 2.6 and 2.8 mm (0.10 and 0.11 in) long and 1.9 and 2.2 mm (0.075 and 0.087 in) wide. It has a dark brown carapace, or upper hard shell of the cephalothorax, that has dense white hairs on the side and two white streaks on the back or fawn-brownish carapace with a brown stripe across the middle at the back. The eye field is black, with long brown bristles near the eyes. The sternum, or underside of the cephalothorax, is yellow. The clypeus is covered with dense long white hairs. The chelicerae are very dark, nearly black. The abdomen is thin and has a pointed end. It is dark brown with two streaks formed of white hairs on its back and a dark yellow underside with a brown stripe down the middle or yellow-white with brown dots on its back, a brown band on the sides and a dark stripe on the underside. It is between 2.7 and 3.1 mm (0.11 and 0.12 in) long and 1.8 and 1.9 mm (0.071 and 0.075 in) wide. The spinnerets are light brown. The legs are dark yellow with brown hairs and spines. It has dark pedipalps. The palpal bulb is typical for the genus.It has a narrow cymbium and long tibial apophysis, or appendage, with very thin tip. It has a very long and thin embolus that entwines the palpal bulb and has a broad membrane at its base. The female has not been described.

The spider is similar to others in the genus. It is related to Mogrus fulvovittatus, but can be distinguished by the membrane at the base of the embolus. Examples found in Yemen are darker than those in the United Arab Emirates.

== Distribution ==
Mogrus cognatus lives in the United Arab Emirates and Yemen. The holotype was discovered near Zabid in Yemen in 1993. Examples have been found in the Al Mahwit Governorate. It was first identified in the United Arab Emirates in Khor al-Khwair in 2007.
