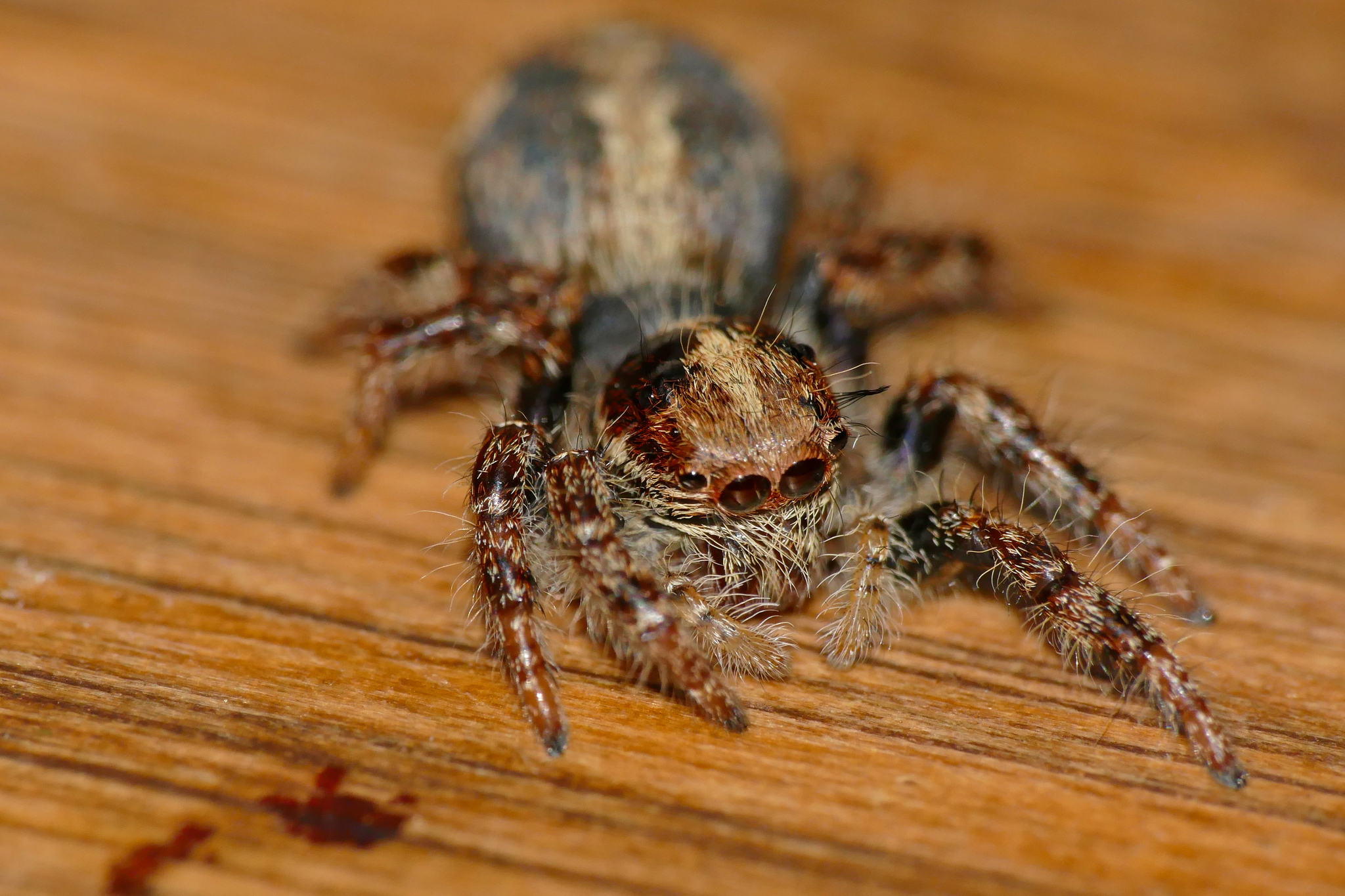
- female
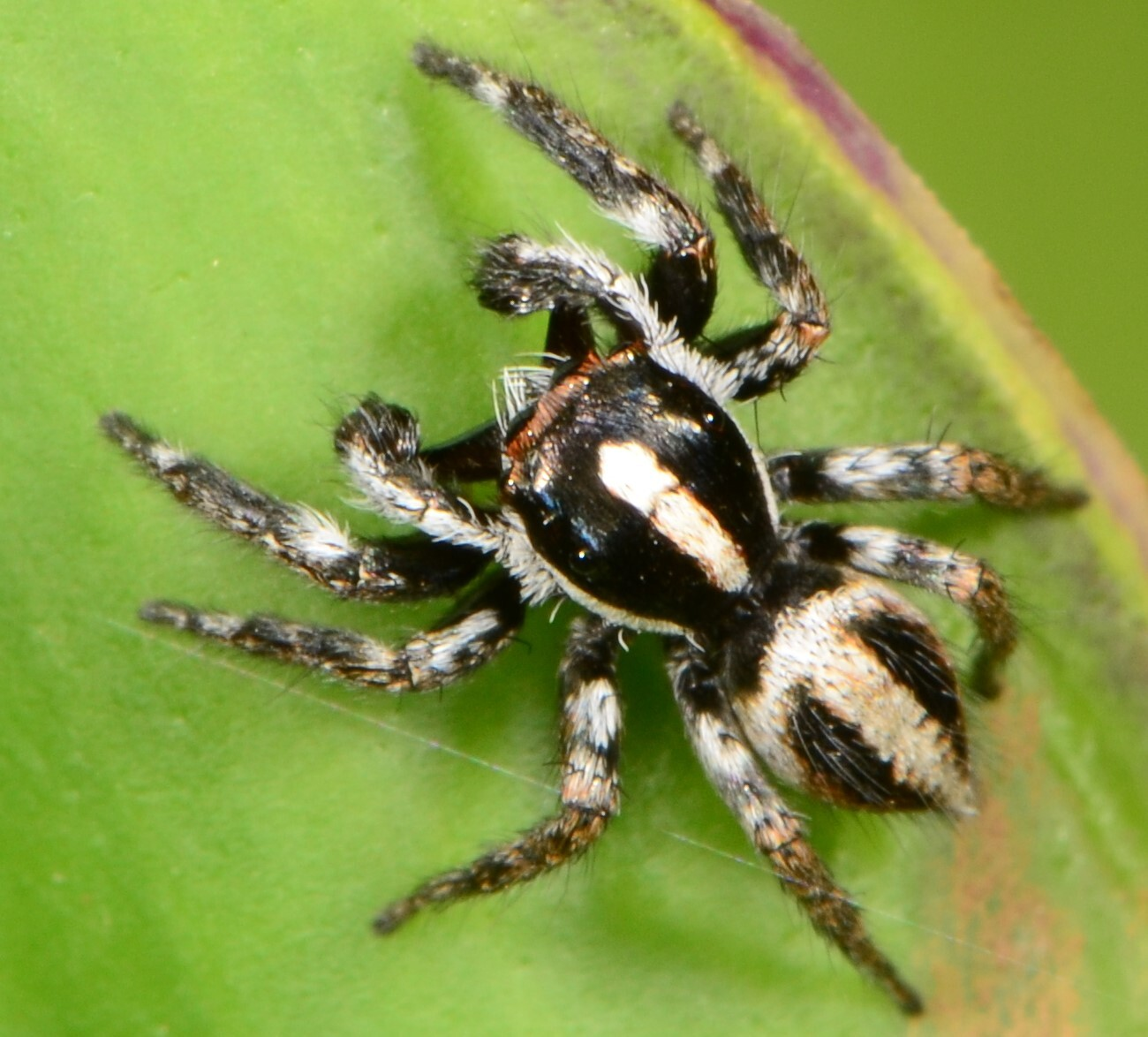
- male

Scientific classification
- Kingdom: Animalia
- Phylum: Arthropoda
- Subphylum: Chelicerata
- Class: Arachnida
- Order: Araneae
- Infraorder: Araneomorphae
- Family: Salticidae
- Genus: Pignus
- Species: P. simoni

Binomial name
- Pignus simoni (Peckham and Peckham, 1903)

= Pignus simoni =

Species of spider

Pignus simoni is a species of jumping spider in the genus Pignus. It is native to South Africa.

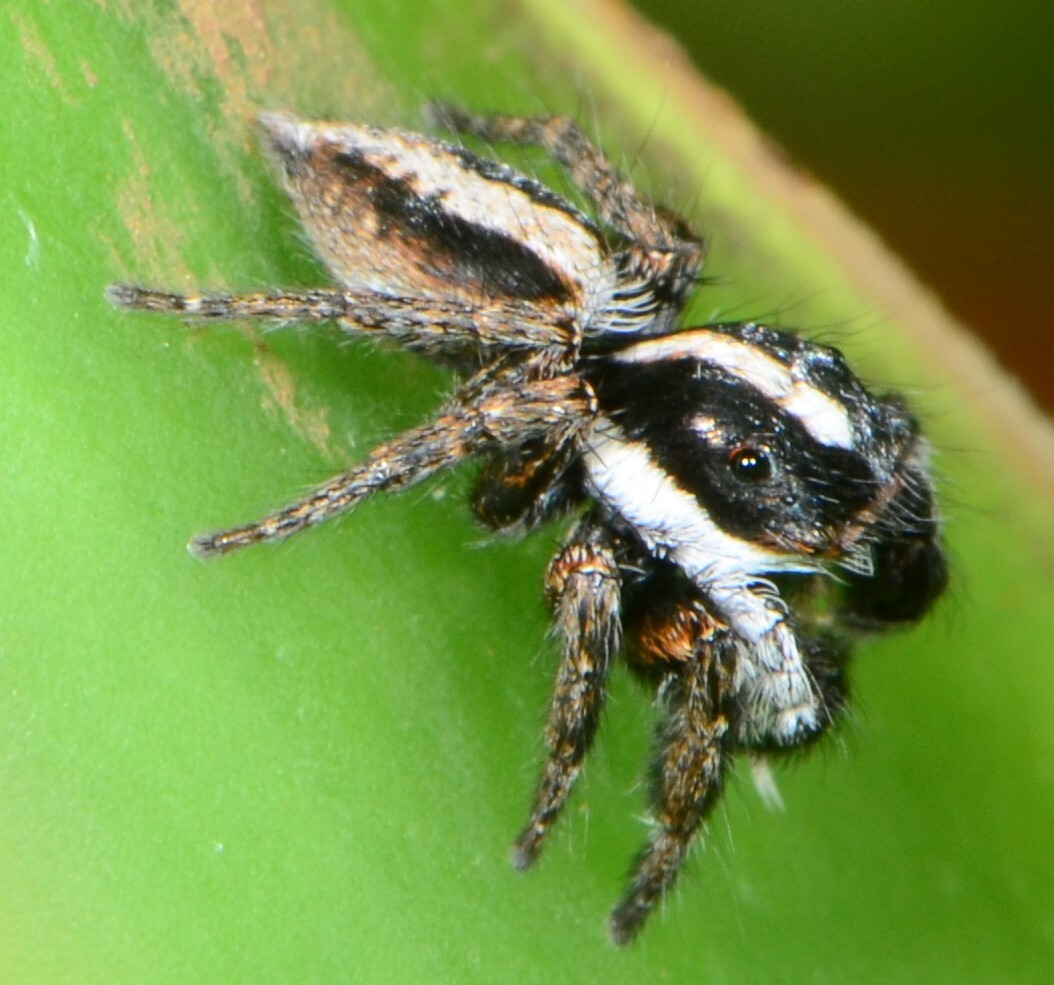
male

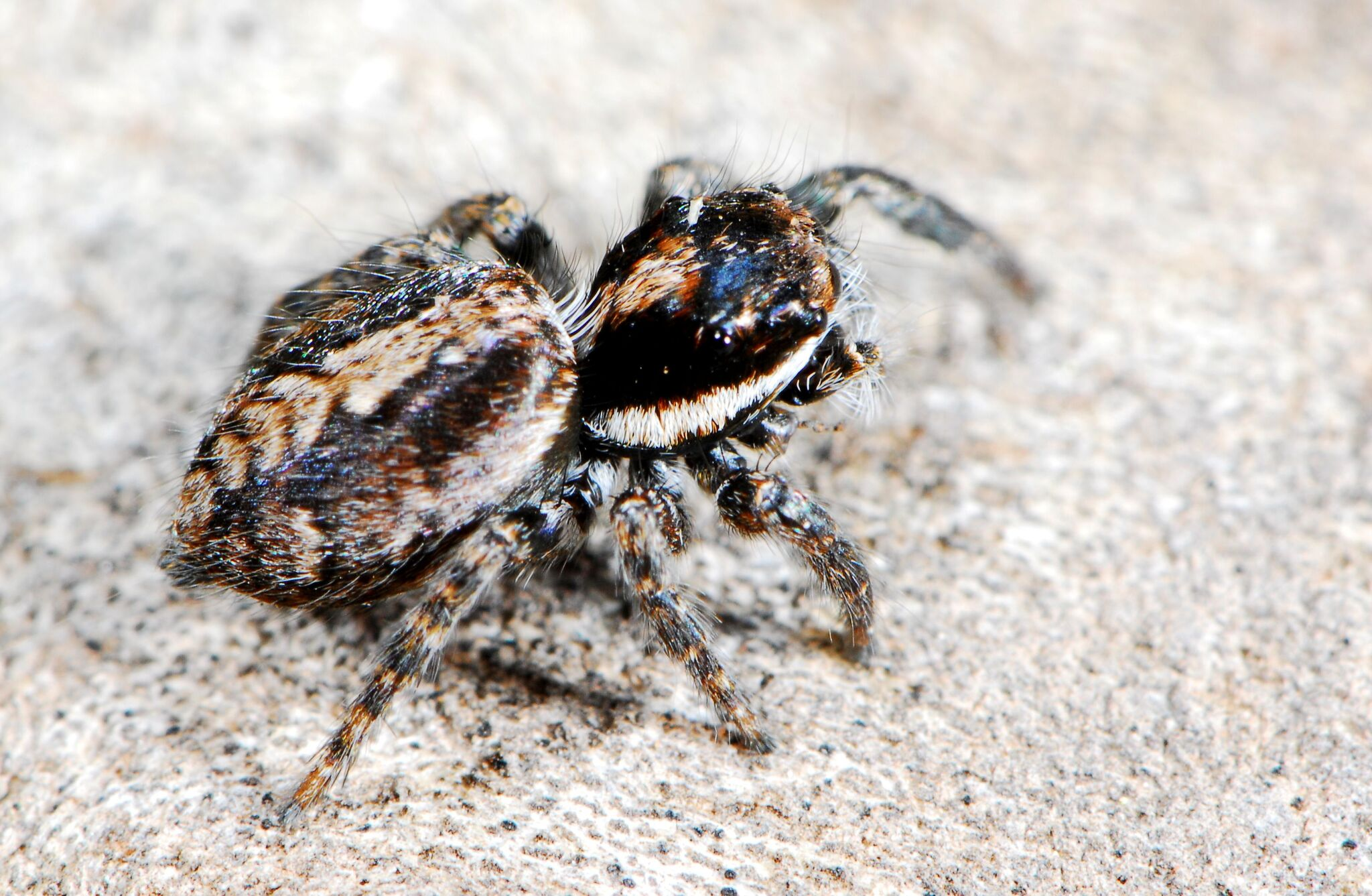
juvenile female

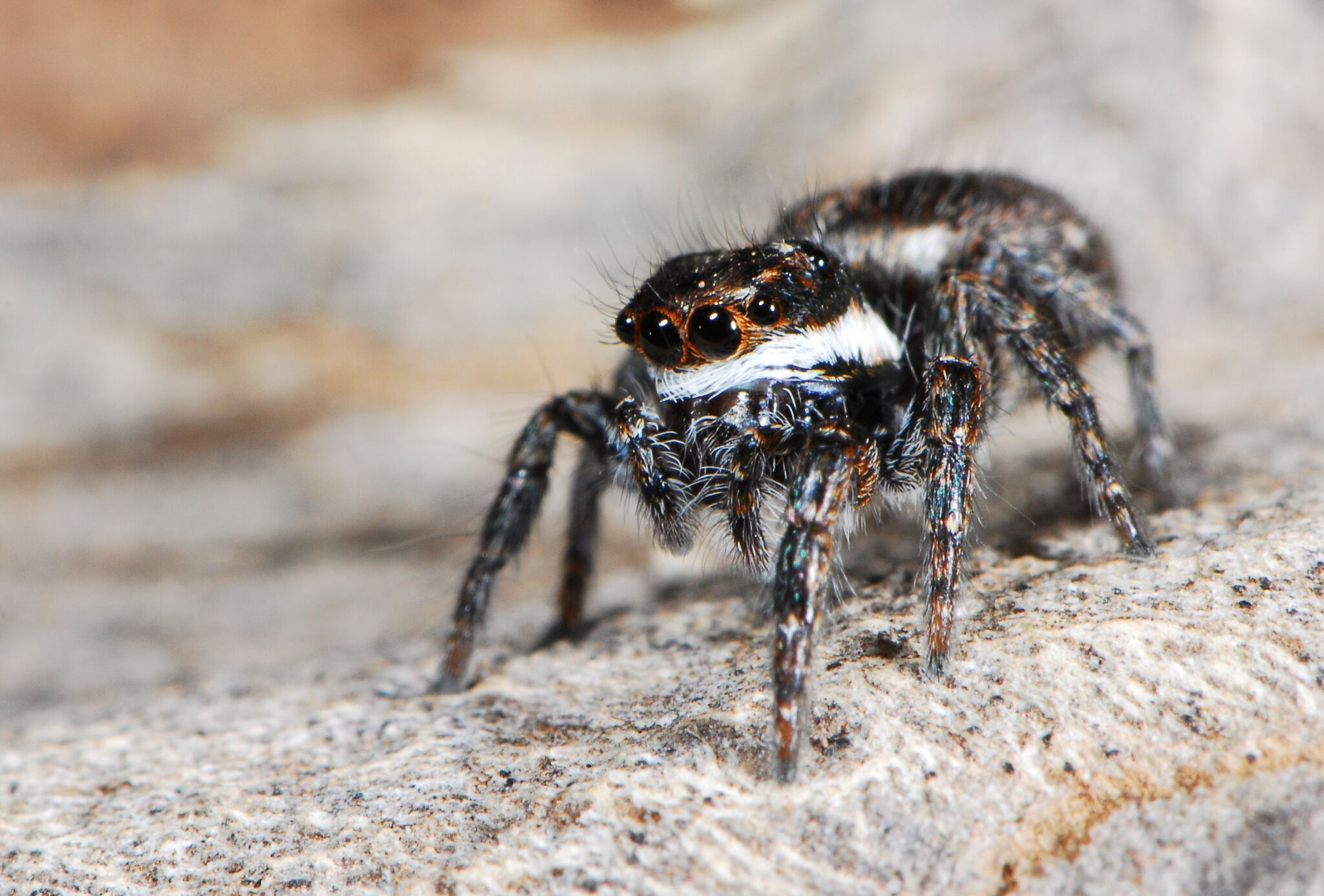
juvenile female
