= Pignus lautissimum =

Scientific classification
- Kingdom: Animalia
- Phylum: Arthropoda
- Subphylum: Chelicerata
- Class: Arachnida
- Order: Araneae
- Infraorder: Araneomorphae
- Family: Salticidae
- Genus: Pignus
- Species: P. lautissimum

Binomial name
- Pignus lautissimum Wesolowska & Russell-Smith, 2000

Species of spider

Pignus lautissimum is a species of jumping spider in the genus Pignus. It is native to Tanzania. The male was first described in 2000.
