= Mogrus ignarus =

Scientific classification
- Kingdom: Animalia
- Phylum: Arthropoda
- Subphylum: Chelicerata
- Class: Arachnida
- Order: Araneae
- Infraorder: Araneomorphae
- Family: Salticidae
- Genus: Mogrus
- Species: M. ignarus

Binomial name
- Mogrus ignarus Wesołowska, 2000

Species of spider

Mogrus ignarus is a species of jumping spider in the genus Mogrus that is endemic to Zimbabwe. The spider was first defined in 2000 by the Polish arachnologist Wanda Wesołowska. It has a dark brown carapace that is between 2.6 and 2.8 mm (0.10 and 0.11 in) and has two white stripes on the back and a white abdomen that is between 2.6 and 3.0 mm (0.10 and 0.12 in) long and a large brown stripe that takes up one third of its back. The spider has brownish legs with long brown spines and hairs. It is similar to other Mogrus spiders. The male has a distinctive membrane and appendage at the base of its embolus on the palpal bulb which distinguishes its from other species in the genus. The female has not been described.

== Taxonomy ==
Mogrus ignarus is a jumping spider that was first described by Wanda Wesołowska in 2000. It is one of over 500 species identified by the Polish arachnologist during her career. She allocated the species to the genus Mogrus, first raised by Eugène Simon in 1882. In Wayne Maddison's 2015 study of spider phylogenetic classification, the genus Mogrus was placed in the clade Simonida within the subfamily Saltafresia. He considered that it a member of the tribe Salticini. Two years later, in 2017, Jerzy Prószyński grouped the genus with nine other genera of jumping spiders under the name Hyllines, which was named after the genus Hyllus. He used the shape of the embolus as a distinguishing sign for the group. Hyllines was itself tentatively placed within a supergroup named Hylloida. The species is named for a Latin word that can be translated unknown.

== Description ==
The species is medium-sized. The male has a high dark brown carapace that is between 2.6 and 2.8 mm (0.10 and 0.11 in) long and between 2.1 and 2.3 mm (0.083 and 0.091 in) wide. It has two stripes made of white hairs that stretch down the middle of the back. The eye field is black and has brown bristles around the eyes. The clypeus is brown and very low. The chelicerae are rather long and have a covering of white hairs. The labium is brown. The abdomen is between 2.6 and 3.0 mm (0.10 and 0.12 in) long and between 1.7 and 2.0 mm (0.067 and 0.079 in) wide. It is elongated and has a pattern on its back with the central third a brown stripe, the remainder white. The underside is dark, as are the spinnerets. The legs are brownish with long brown spines and hairs. The pedipalps are dark. The palpal bulb has a single upright pointed tibial apophysis and long thin embolus. The embolus has a membrane and long appendage at its base. This appendage helps distinguish the species from the otherwise similar Mogrus antoninus, which lives in Central Asia. It is also similar to Mogrus mathisi, with the wider palpal bulb and extension on the tegulum being the most obvious features that differentiate the other species as well as the lack of the embolus' membrane and appendage. The female has not been described.

== Distribution ==
Mogrus ignarus is endemic to Zimbabwe. The holotype was discovered in the Doddiebum Ranch alongside a larger paratype in 1985.
