= Tusitala yemenica =

Scientific classification
- Kingdom: Animalia
- Phylum: Arthropoda
- Subphylum: Chelicerata
- Class: Arachnida
- Order: Araneae
- Infraorder: Araneomorphae
- Family: Salticidae
- Genus: Tusitala
- Species: T. yemenica

Binomial name
- Tusitala yemenica Wesołowska & van Harten, 1994

Species of jumping spider

Tusitala yemenica is a species of jumping spider that is endemic in Yemen. The only member of the genus Tusitala found in the country, indeed the only member of the genus that does not live in Africa, it is so closely related to Tusitala barbata that it is uncertain that it is its own species. It is approximately between 4.4 and 6.3 mm (0.17 and 0.25 in) in total length. The upper side of the front section of the spider, known as its carapace is usually brown as are its mouthparts. The remainder of the spider is generally yellow and hairy, although some specimen were found to have a mottled pattern of yellow and brown on their abdomen. The male has Very long fine hairs forming a basket-like shape on its jaw-like chelicerae. It can be distinguished from its relatives by its copulatory organs, and particularly the internal design with the female's insemination ducts, that have a single loop, and rounded spermathecae, or receptacles. The male has a wider palpal tibia than others in the genus. The female was first described in 1994 and the male in 2007.

== Taxonomy ==
Tusitala yemenica is a species of jumping spider, a member of the family Salticidae, that was first described by the arachnologists Charles Haddad and Wanda Wesołowska in 2013. It was one of over 500 species that Wesołowska identified during her career. They assigned the species to the genus Tusitala, first circumscribed by George and Elizabeth Peckham in 1902. The holotype is stored in the Royal Museum for Central Africa in Tervuren.

In Wayne Maddison's 2015 study of spider phylogenetic classification, the genus Tusitala was listed in the tribe Salticini. This is a member of the clade Saltafresia. Maddison placed this tribe in the subclade Simonida. Jerzy Prószyński placed the genus in an informal group called Hyllines in 2017. Galina Azarkina and Stefan Foord have suggested that the species is a junior synonym of Tusitala barbata due to the similarity of the specimen described and the variation that exists within the species. If this is the case, the two could be combined in one species.

== Description ==
The female has a brown carapace, the top side of its forward section, that ranges between 2.1 and 2.5 mm (0.08 and 0.10 in) in length and between 1.8 and 2.0 mm (0.07 and 0.08 in) in width. It is convex with a large eye field that fills half its length, with black regions and long brown bristles around the eyes themselves. It is covered in very short light hairs, which form a denser covering towards the rear. The part of its underside known as its sternum is yellow. Long white hairs can be seen on the part of the spider's face known as the clypeus. Its mouthparts are brown, its labium and maxillae, having yellow margins, while its jaw-like chelicerae have two teeth on the margin at the front with a single tooth split into two behind.

Behind its carapace, the female has an oval, squat abdomen that ranges between 2.3 and 3.8 mm (0.09 and 0.15 in) in length and between 1.7 and 2.8 mm (0.07 and 0.11 in) in width. Its top is yellowish and covered in long bushy brown and light hairs, sometimes with a faint russet pattern barely visible on its surface. One specimen had a more pronounced pattern based on a mosaic of brown dots and spots. The underside of its abdomen is pale. The spider has yellowish spinnerets and yellow legs, with brown hairs and spines.

The spider's epigyne, the external visible part of the female's copulatory organs, is rounded with a large depression in the middle. There are two copulatory openings that lead to large oval spermathecae, or receptacles, joined by a stalk to even larger spermathecae. Compared to the related Tusitala lutzi, which also has insemination ducts that form a single loop, its spermathecae are more rounded. It can be distinguished from Tusitala barbata by the length of its insemination ducts and the fact they only loop once.

The male has a larger carapace than the female, typically 2.8 mm (0.11 in) long and 2.1 mm (0.08 in) wide. It is medium high with a smaller eye field, and covered in short hairs, amongst which are scattered a few longer brown bristles that are more frequent near its eyes. It is mainly brown but with lighter slopes, a lighter area near its eyes and an edge marked with a dark line. Its sternum is yellow like the female but its mouthparts are a darker brown. Very long fine hairs form a basket-like shape on its chelicerae.

The male's abdomen is typically 3 mm (0.12 in) long and 1.6 mm (0.06 in) wide. Its top, which has a mottled pattern of brown and yellow, has dense white and brown hairs along its front edge and long brown bristles scattered across the rest of its surface. Its underside is lighter and has a brown streak that runs from the front to the back. It has yellow legs with black hairs and many spines.

The male has a long palpal tibia that has a single large protrusion, or tibial apophysis that finishes in a small spike. At the end of the tibia is the spider's palpal bulb, which consists of a bulbous tegulum, which seems to have at least three bulges, and, starting from the bottom and circling round the tegulum to project at an angle away towards the top, a thin embolus. The palpal bulb is protected by a hairy cymbium that is nearly twice its size. It can distinguished from its relatives by its relatively wide palpal tibia.

== Distribution ==
Tusitala yemenica is endemic to Yemen. Tusitala spiders are mainly found in Africa, this species being the only one that has been found outside the continent. It has been seen in the Al Mahwit, Dhamar, Hadhramaut and Hajjah Governorates.
