= Tusitala proxima =

Scientific classification
- Kingdom: Animalia
- Phylum: Arthropoda
- Subphylum: Chelicerata
- Class: Arachnida
- Order: Araneae
- Infraorder: Araneomorphae
- Family: Salticidae
- Genus: Tusitala
- Species: T. proxima

Binomial name
- Tusitala proxima Wesołowska & Russell-Smith, 2000

Species of jumping spider

Tusitala proxima is a species of jumping spider that lives in Tanzania. A member of the genus Tusitala, its name is a Latin word that means “consecutive”. Typically 5 mm (0.20 in) long, the spider is hard to distinguish from the related Tusitala barbata. It has a darker carapace, the hard upper part of its front section, and, behind that, a more swollen abdomen. It can be most easily distinguished by its copulatory organs. First described in 2000, the female has long insemination ducts that follow a closer and wider set of coils. It also has smaller receptacles, or spermathecae and larger accessory glands. The male has not been identified.

== Taxonomy and etymology ==
Tusitala proxima is a species of jumping spider, a member of the family Salticidae, that was first described by the arachnologists Wanda Wesołowska and Anthony Russell-Smith in 2000. It was one of over 500 species that Wesołowska identified during her career. The holotype is stored at the Royal Museum for Central Africa in Tervuren. It is named for a Latin word that means “consecutive”.

They allocated it to the genus Tusitala, first circumscribed by George and Elizabeth Peckham in 1902. In Wayne Maddison's 2015 study of spider phylogenetic classification, the genus Tusitala was listed in the tribe Salticini. This is a member of the clade Saltafresia. Maddison placed this tribe in the subclade Simonida. Jerzy Prószyński placed the genus in an informal group called Hyllines in 2017.

== Description ==
Tusitala proxima is similar to the related Tusitala barbata. It has a carapace, the hard upper part of its front section, that is generally darker. It is typically 2.7 mm (0.11 in) in length and typically 1.9 mm (0.07 in) wide. It is covered in brown hairs and has a scattering of white hairs in the middle and on its sides. There are also a few hairs on the part of its face known as its clypeus. Its mouthparts, including its labium and maxillae, are brown and its chelicerae have two teeth visible at the front.

Behind its carapace, the spider has a larger abdomen, measuring typically 3.3 mm (0.13 in) long and 2.2 mm (0.09 in) wide. It is more swollen that the abdomen of Tusitala barbata and lighter. It has a sparse covering of fawn hairs. The spider also has light spinnerets that it uses to spin webs. It is its copulatory organs that most distinguish the spider from Tusitala barbata. The female has long insemination ducts that follow a closer and wider set of coils. These lead to smaller receptacles, or spermathecae. In contrast, its accessory glands are larger. The male has not been described.

== Distribution and habitat ==
Tusitala spiders can be found across Africa. Tusitala proxima is endemic to Tanzania. The holotype was found in Mkomazi National Park in 1996. It lives amongst fragments of rock in rocky gulleys.
