= Mogrus sahariensis =

Scientific classification
- Kingdom: Animalia
- Phylum: Arthropoda
- Subphylum: Chelicerata
- Class: Arachnida
- Order: Araneae
- Infraorder: Araneomorphae
- Family: Salticidae
- Genus: Mogrus
- Species: M. sahariensis

Binomial name
- Mogrus sahariensis Berland & Millot, 1941

Species of spider

Mogrus sahariensis is a species of jumping spider in the genus Mogrus that lives in West Africa and has also been observed in northern Egypt. The female was first described in 1941.
