= Qatabah =

Qatabah قطابة
- Sub-district
- Country: Yemen
- Governorate: 'Amran Governorate
- District: As Sawd District

Population (2004)
  - Total: 2,173
- Time zone: UTC+3

Qatabah (Arabic: قطابة) is a sub-district located in As Sawd District, 'Amran Governorate, Yemen. Qatabah had a population of 2173 according to the 2004 census.
