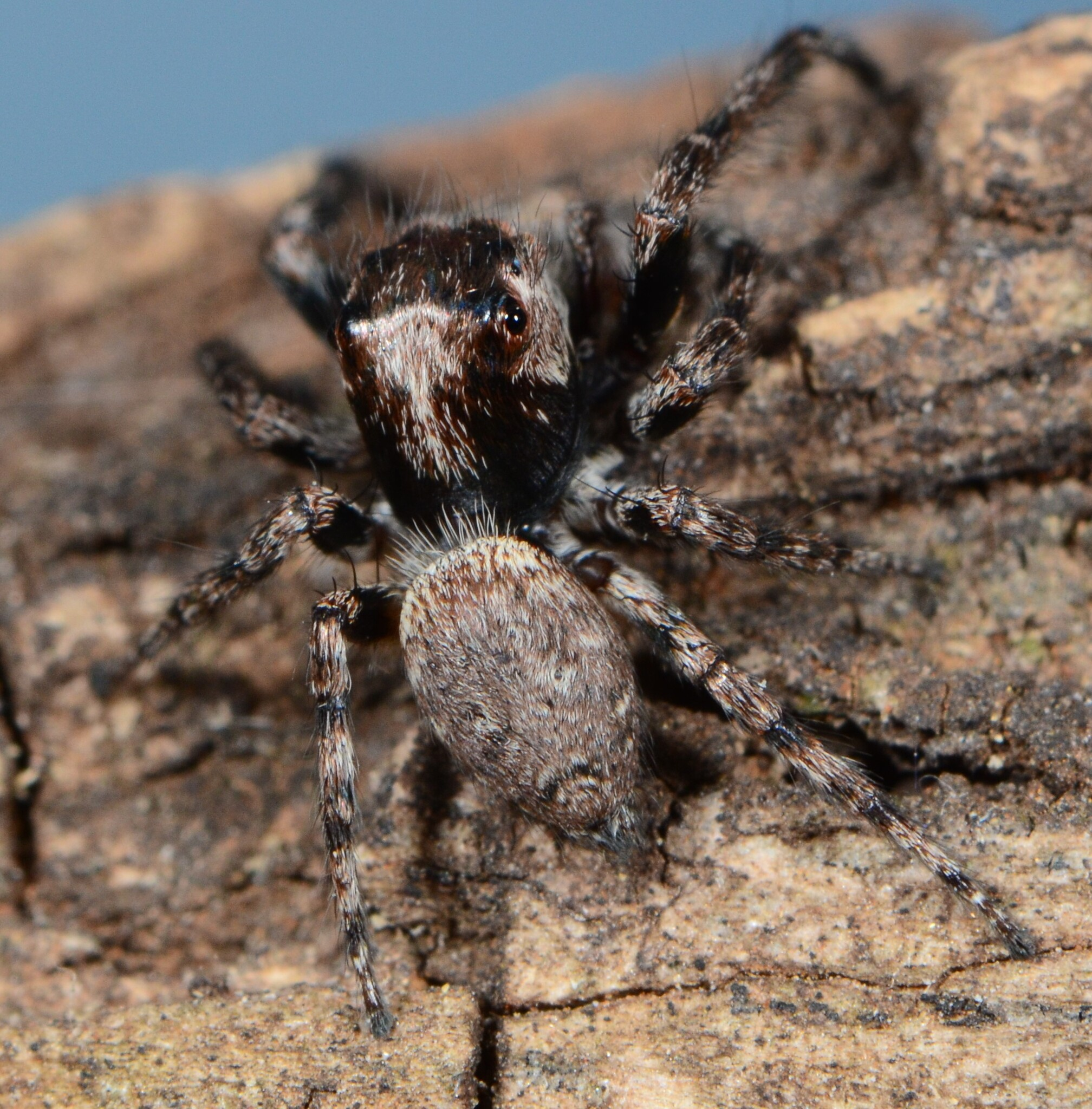
- female T. barbata
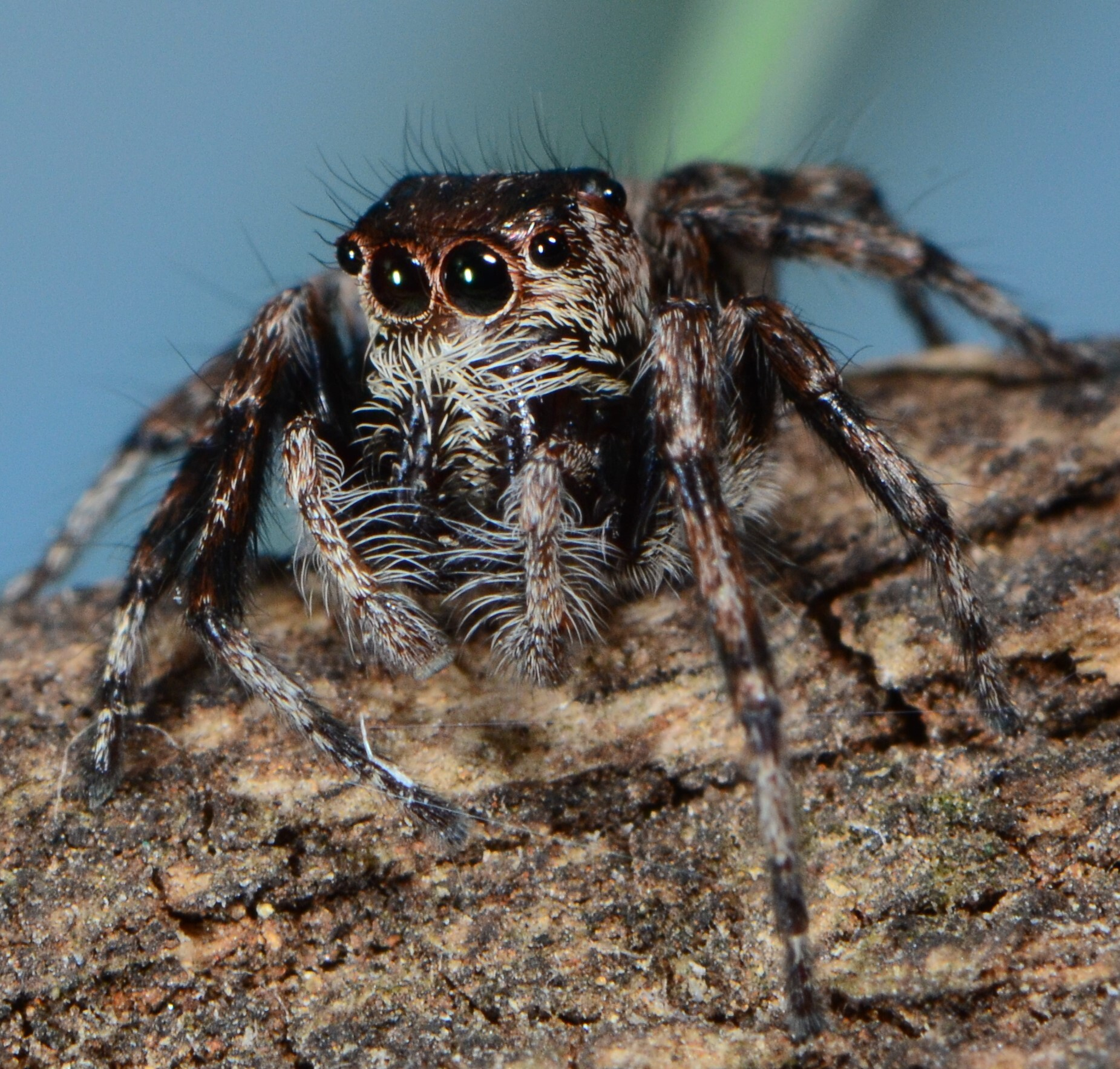
- female T. barbata

Scientific classification
- Kingdom: Animalia
- Phylum: Arthropoda
- Subphylum: Chelicerata
- Class: Arachnida
- Order: Araneae
- Infraorder: Araneomorphae
- Family: Salticidae
- Subfamily: Salticinae
- Genus: Tusitala; Peckham & Peckham, 1902

Type species
- T. barbata Peckham & Peckham, 1902

Species
- 13, see text

Synonyms
- Blaisea Simon, 1903; Monclova G. W. Peckham & E. G. Peckham, 1902

= Tusitala =

Genus of spiders

Tusitala is a genus of jumping spiders that was first described by George and Elizabeth Peckham in 1902. The name is Samoan, meaning "writer of stories". It is considered a senior synonym of Blaisea.

== Distribution ==
All but one described species are found in Africa, with T. yemenica endemic to nearby Yemen.

== Species ==
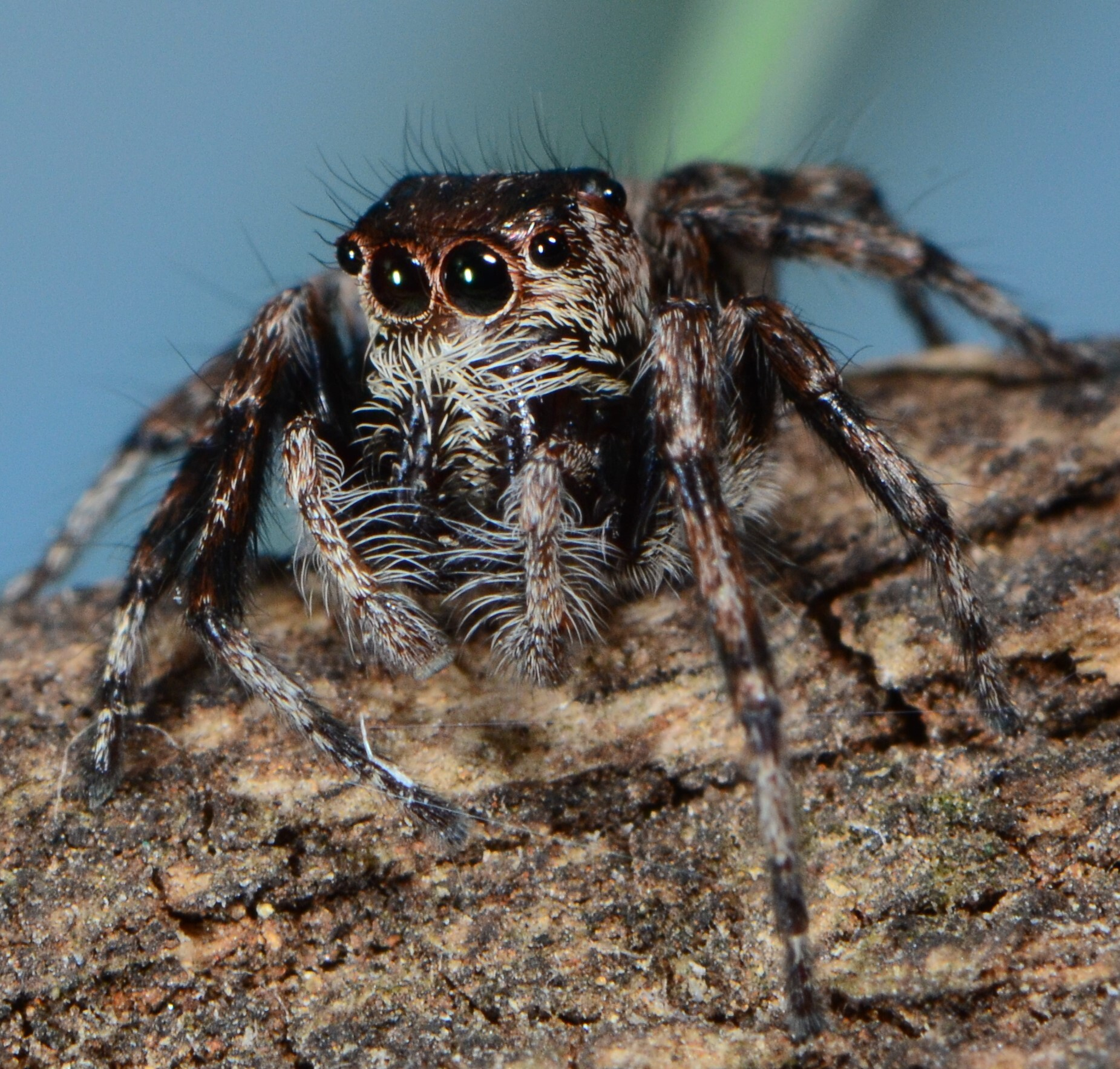
female T. barbata

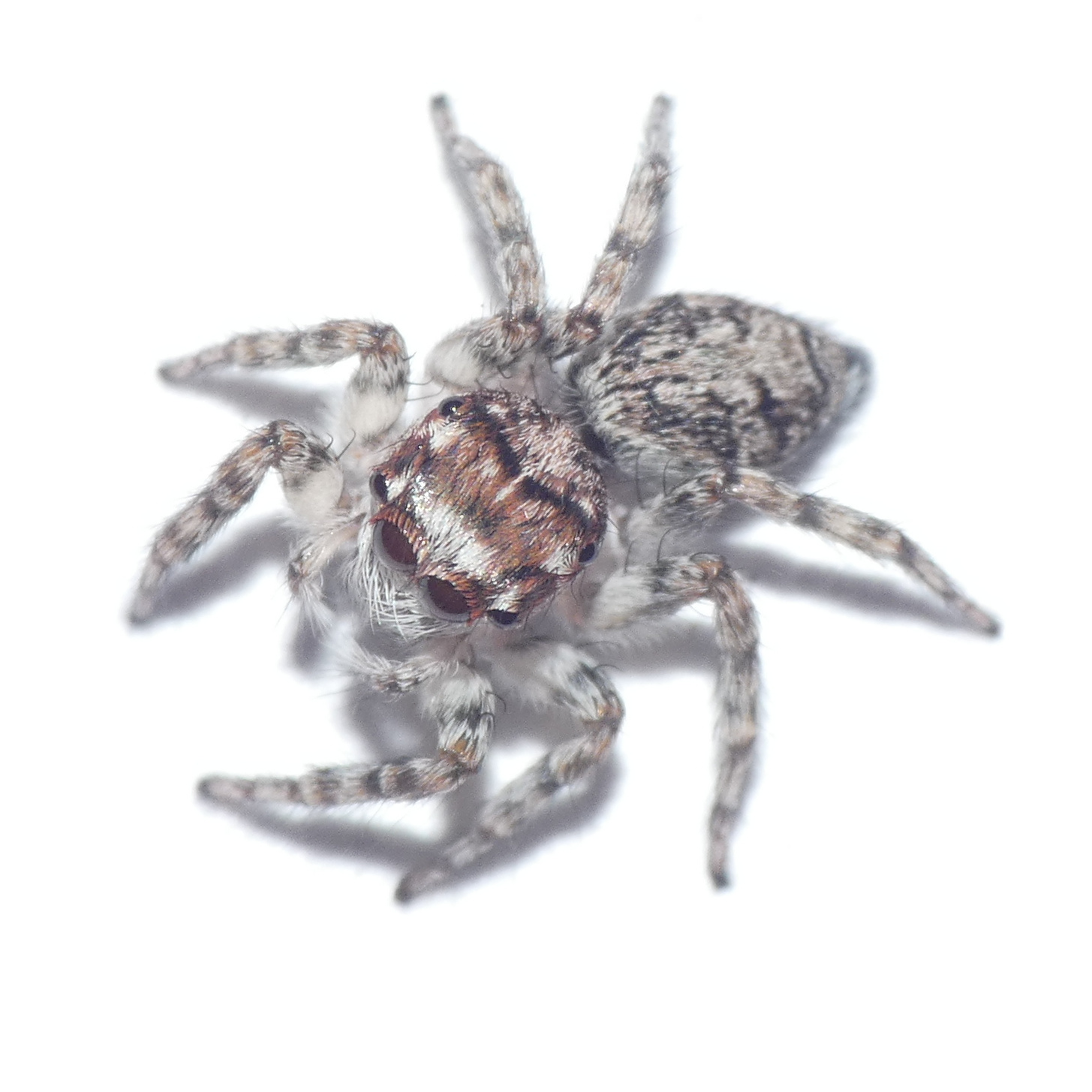
T. hirsuta

As of October 2025, this genus includes thirteen species:

- Tusitala ansieae Azarkina & Foord, 2015 – Botswana
- Tusitala bandama Wesołowska & Russell-Smith, 2022 – Ivory Coast
- Tusitala barbata G. W. Peckham & E. G. Peckham, 1902 – Guinea, Ivory Coast, Nigeria, Cameroon, Uganda, Kenya, Tanzania, Botswana, Zimbabwe, Mozambique, South Africa (type species)
- Tusitala cornuta Wesołowska & Russell-Smith, 2022 – Ivory Coast
- Tusitala discibulba Caporiacco, 1941 – Ethiopia
- Tusitala guineensis Berland & Millot, 1941 – Guinea, Ivory Coast
- Tusitala hirsuta G. W. Peckham & E. G. Peckham, 1902 – Tanzania, Zambia, Botswana, Mozambique, South Africa
- Tusitala lutzi Lessert, 1927 – Ivory Coast, DR Congo
- Tusitala lyrata (Simon, 1903) – Guinea, DR Congo, Uganda, Kenya, Mozambique
- Tusitala proxima Wesołowska & Russell-Smith, 2000 – Tanzania
- Tusitala ugandensis Wiśniewski & Wesołowska, 2024 – Uganda
- Tusitala unica Wesołowska & Russell-Smith, 2000 – Tanzania
- Tusitala yemenica Wesołowska & van Harten, 1994 – Yemen
