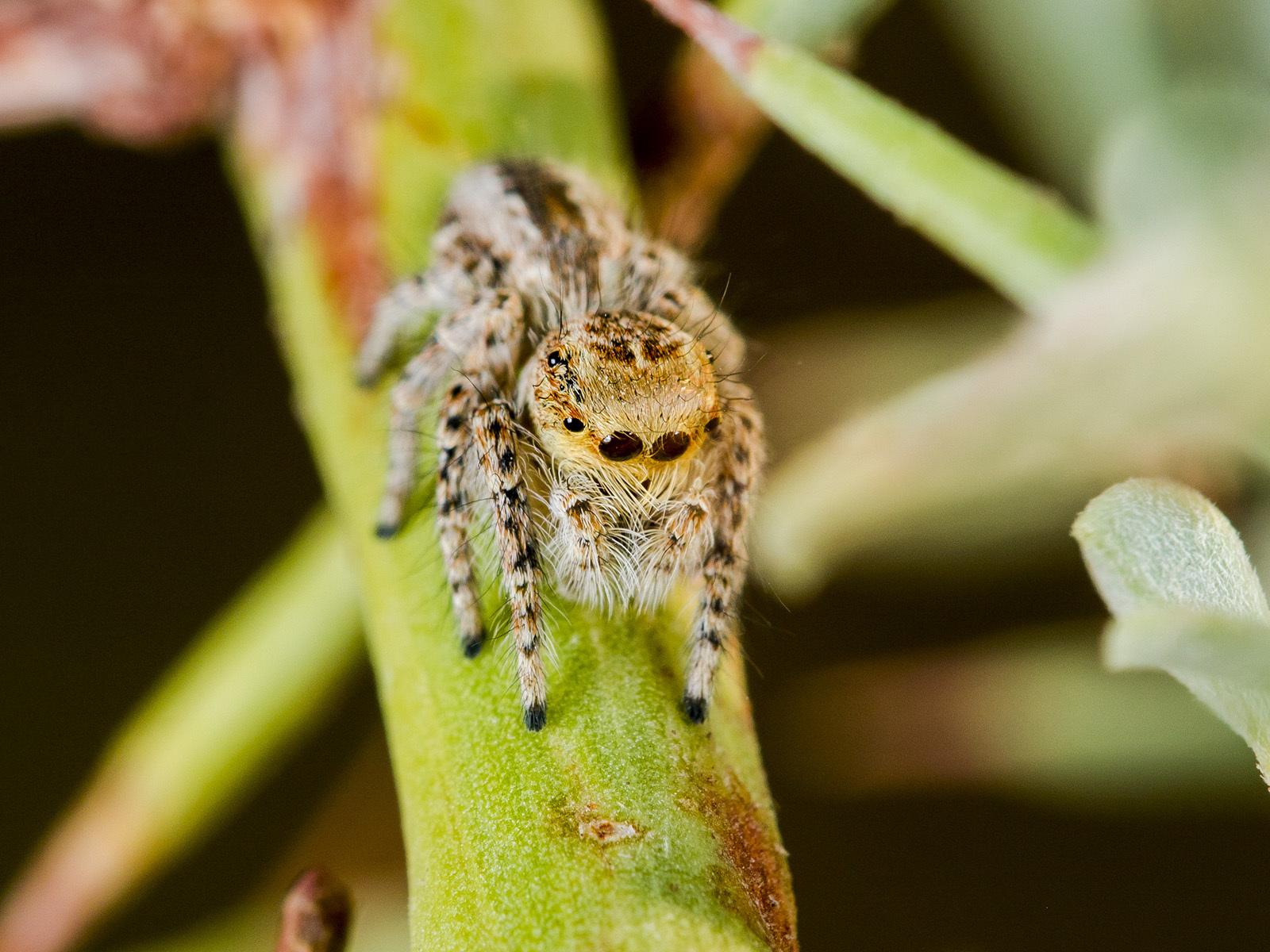
- M. larisae
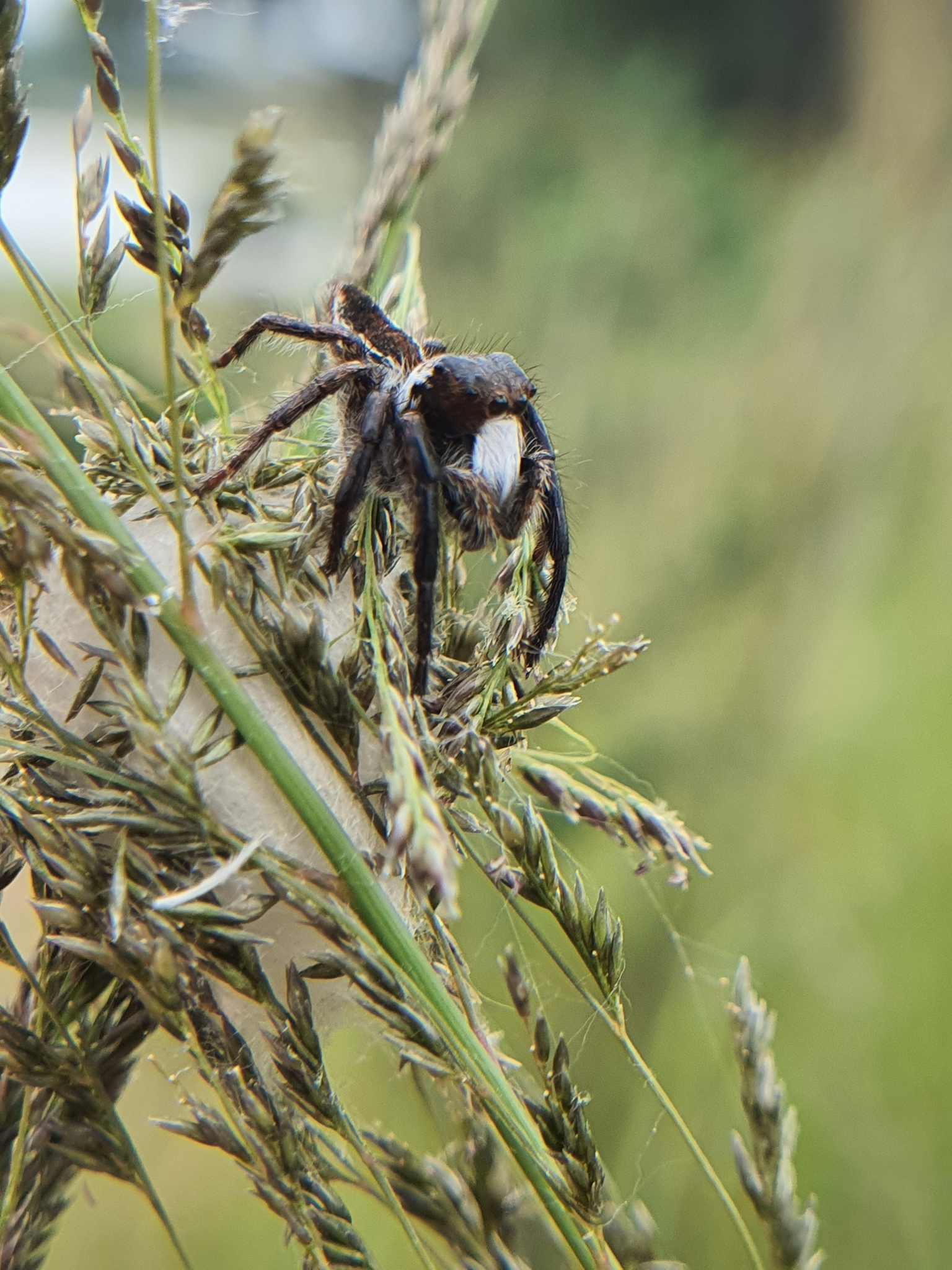
- M. mathisi

Scientific classification
- Kingdom: Animalia
- Phylum: Arthropoda
- Subphylum: Chelicerata
- Class: Arachnida
- Order: Araneae
- Infraorder: Araneomorphae
- Family: Salticidae
- Subfamily: Salticinae
- Genus: Mogrus; Simon, 1882

Type species
- M. fulvovittatus Simon, 1882

Species
- 30, see text

= Mogrus =

Genus of spiders

Mogrus is a genus of jumping spiders that was first described by Eugène Louis Simon in 1882.

== Distribution ==
Mogrus are found in Asia, Europe, and Africa.

== Species ==
female M. canescens

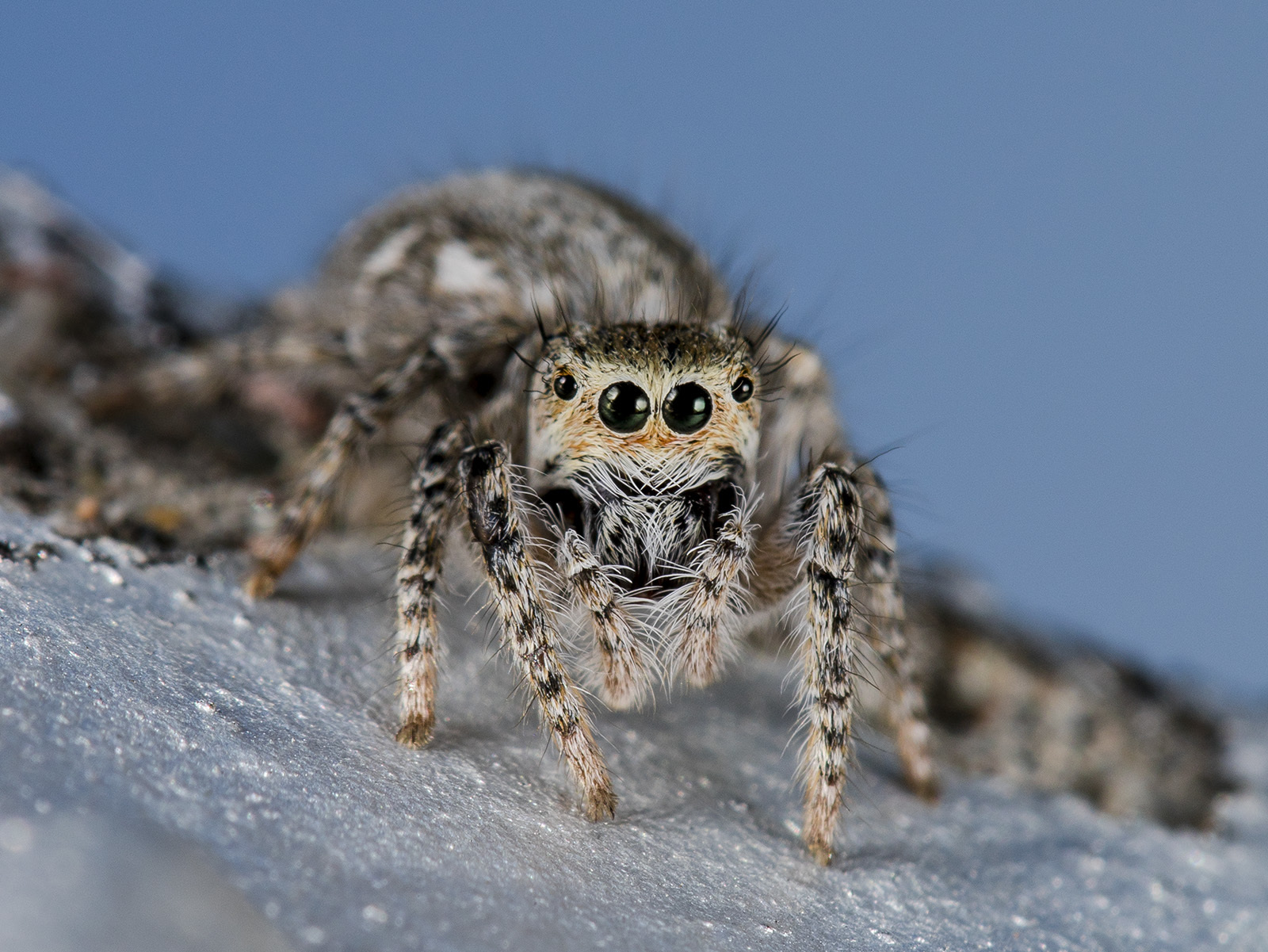
M. larisae

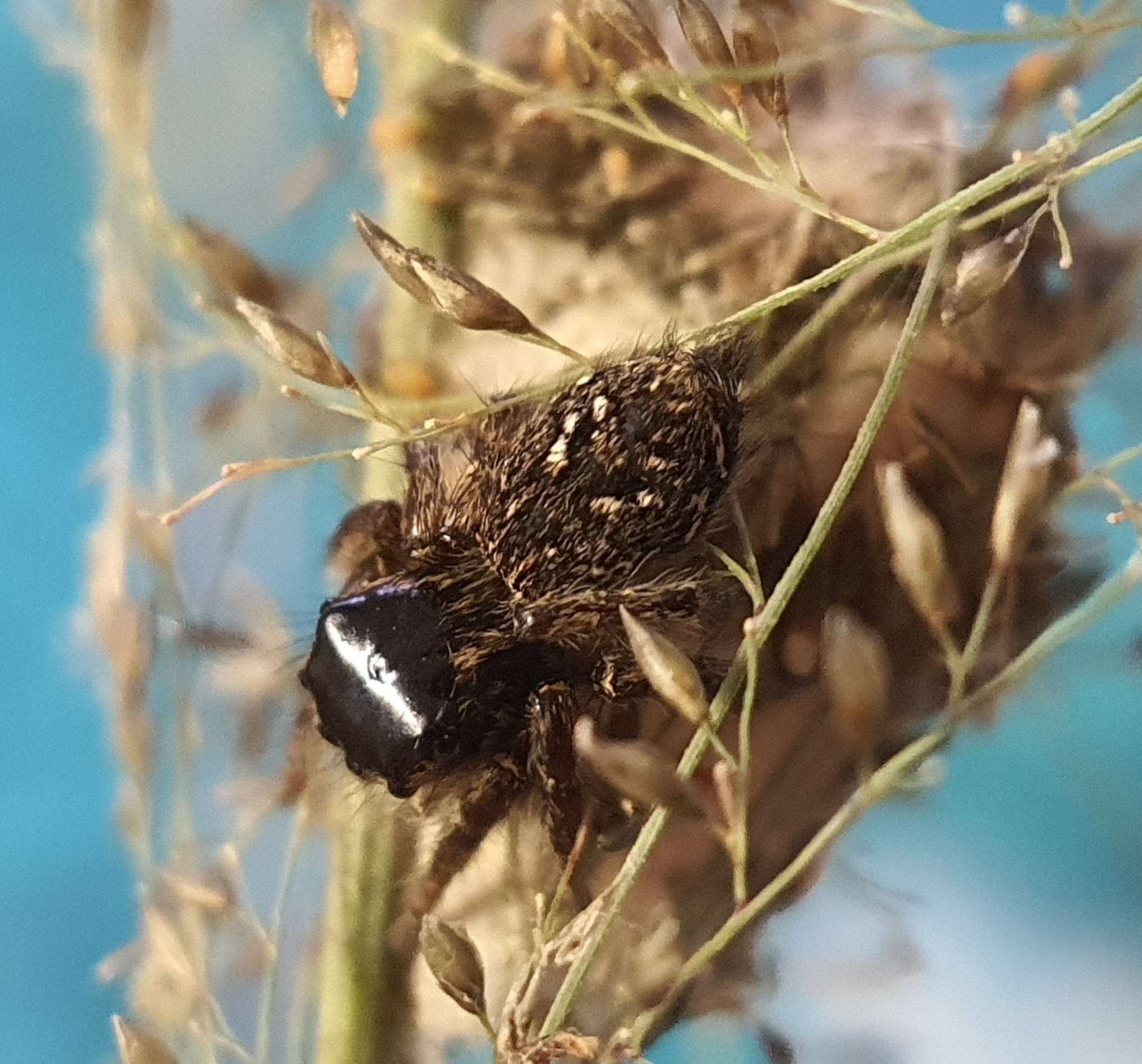
M. mathisi

As of April 2026, this genus includes 30 species:

- Mogrus albogularis Simon, 1901 – South Africa
- Mogrus antoninus Andreeva, 1976 – Russia (Europe to Central Asia), Kazakhstan, Iran, Afghanistan, Central Asia, China
- Mogrus bonneti (Audouin, 1826) – Egypt to Yemen
- Mogrus canescens (C. L. Koch, 1846) – Eastern Mediterranean
- Mogrus cognatus Wesołowska & van Harten, 1994 – Yemen, United Arab Emirates
- Mogrus dalmasi Berland & Millot, 1941 – Mali
- Mogrus fabrei Simon, 1885 – India
- Mogrus faizabadicus Andreeva, Kononenko & Prószyński, 1981 – Afghanistan
- Mogrus flavescentemaculatus (Lucas, 1846) – Algeria
- Mogrus frontosus (Simon, 1871) – France (Corsica), Italy (Sardinia), Sri Lanka (introduced?)
- Mogrus fulvovittatus Simon, 1882 – Egypt, Saudi Arabia, Yemen (type species)
- Mogrus ignarus Wesołowska, 2000 – Zimbabwe
- Mogrus incertus Denis, 1955 – Libya, Niger
- Mogrus larisae Logunov, 1995 – Kazakhstan, Iran, Uzbekistan, Turkmenistan, Kyrgyzstan
- Mogrus leucochelis Pavesi, 1897 – Somalia
- Mogrus logunovi Prószyński, 2000 – Algeria, Egypt, Cyprus, Israel, Jordan, Yemen, United Arab Emirates
- Mogrus macrocephalus Lawrence, 1927 – Namibia
- Mogrus mathisi (Berland & Millot, 1941) – Africa, Saudi Arabia, Yemen
- Mogrus mirabilis Wesołowska & van Harten, 1994 – Sudan, Egypt, Yemen, Saudi Arabia, Jordan, Iraq
- Mogrus neglectus (Simon, 1868) – Algeria, North Macedonia, Greece, Turkey, Cyprus, Israel, Caucasus, Iran, Kazakhstan
- Mogrus praecinctus Simon, 1890 – Yemen
- Mogrus pune Tripathi, Kulkarni & Kadam, 2026 – India
- Mogrus rajasthanensis Caleb, Chatterjee, Tyagi, Kundu & Kumar, 2017 – India
- Mogrus sahariensis Berland & Millot, 1941 – Egypt, Niger
- Mogrus semicanus Simon, 1910 – Namibia
- Mogrus shuska Tripathi, Kulkarni & Kadam, 2026 – India
- Mogrus sinaicus Prószyński, 2000 – Egypt, Saudi Arabia
- Mogrus sivand Logunov, 2023 – Iran
- Mogrus valerii Kononenko, 1981 – Turkmenistan, Uzbekistan
- Mogrus woodi (G. W. Peckham & E. G. Peckham, 1902) – Zimbabwe
