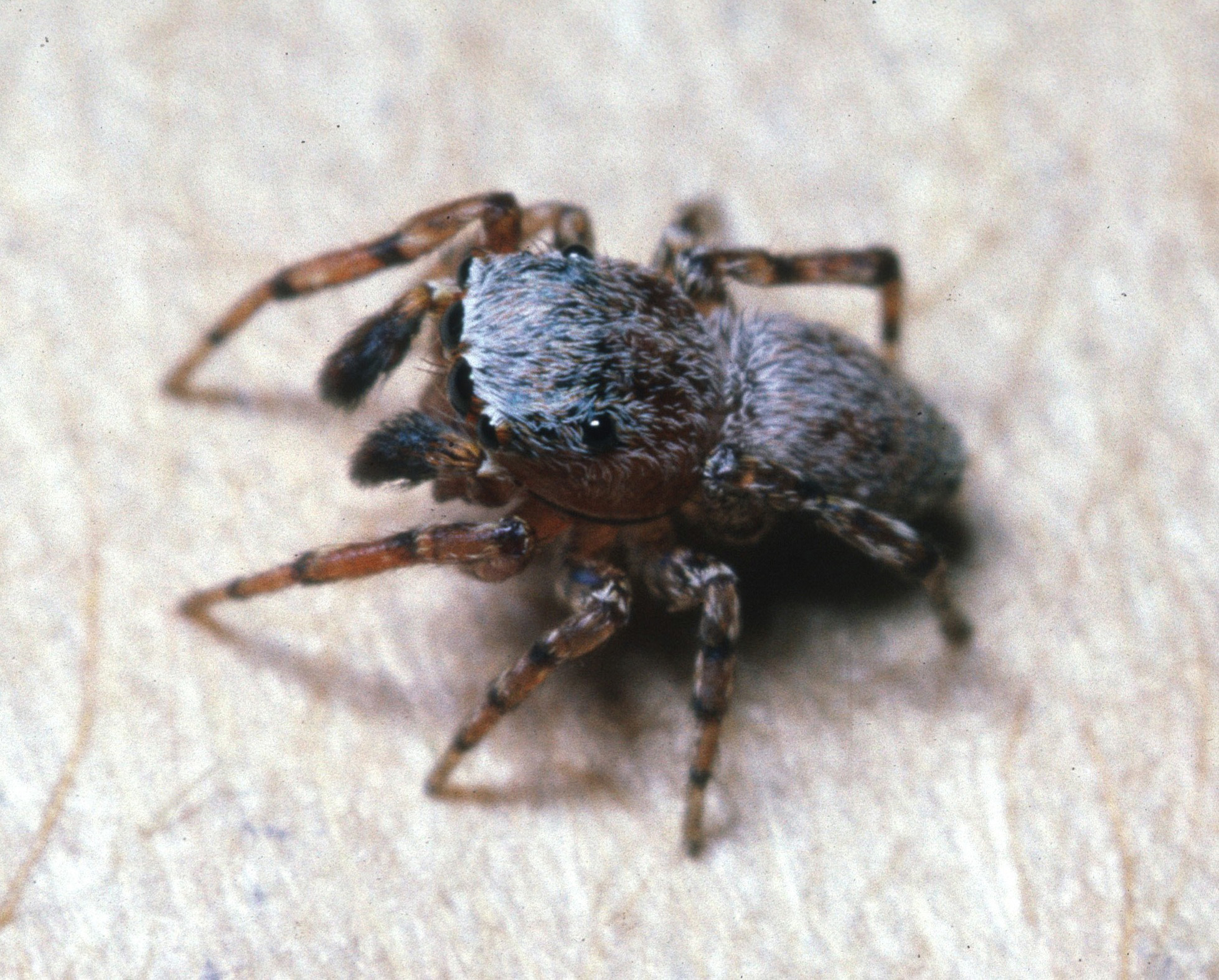
- Male Attinella concolor in Bastrop County, Texas

Scientific classification
- Kingdom: Animalia
- Phylum: Arthropoda
- Subphylum: Chelicerata
- Class: Arachnida
- Order: Araneae
- Infraorder: Araneomorphae
- Family: Salticidae
- Tribe: Sitticini
- Genus: Attinella; Banks, 1905

Type species
- Attus dorsatus Banks, 1895

Species
- Attinella concolor (Banks, 1895); Attinella dorsata (Banks, 1895); Attinella juniperi (Gertsch & Riechert, 1976)

Synonyms
- Sittiab Prószyński, 2017

= Attinella =

Genus of jumping spiders

Attinella is a genus of North American jumping spiders. It was first described by Nathan Banks in 1905 based on the type species Attinella dorsata (originally Attus dorsatus). As of March 2022 it contains only three species: A. concolor, A. dorsata, and A. juniperi. It was synonymized with Sitticus from 1979 to 2017, when the genus Sittiab was split from Sitticus by Prószyński in 2017, and Attinella was recognized as its senior synonym.

== Phylogeny ==
Attinella is placed in the tribe Sitticini within the family Salticidae. In 2020, Wayne Maddison and co-workers divided the tribe Sitticini into two subtribes, Aillutticina and Sitticina. Attinella was placed in Sitticina, within a clade whose sister was the genus Attulus. The relationship between these taxa is shown in the following cladogram.

- Sitticini
  - Aillutticina
    Five Neotropical genera
  - Sitticina
    - Jolias–Tomis clade
      - - Attinella
        - Jollas
      - - Sittisax
        - Tomis
    - Attulus

== See also ==
- Sitticus
- List of Salticidae genera
