= Nosferattus =

Scientific classification
- Kingdom: Animalia
- Phylum: Arthropoda
- Subphylum: Chelicerata
- Class: Arachnida
- Order: Araneae
- Infraorder: Araneomorphae
- Family: Salticidae
- Tribe: Sitticini
- Genus: Nosferattus; Ruiz & Brescovit, 2005

Type species
- N. discus Ruiz & Brescovit, 2005

Species
- 5, see text

Genus of spiders

Nosferattus is a genus of Brazilian jumping spiders that was first described by G. R. S. Ruiz & Antônio Domingos Brescovit in 2005. The name is a combination of "Nosferatu" and the ending -attus, a common salticid genera suffix.

They range from 3 to 5.5 millimetres (0.12 to 0.22 in) long. Males have a smooth, oval-shaped plate (scutum) on the upper surface of the opisthosoma (abdomen). Nosferattus can be distinguished from other genera in the tribe Sitticini by the presence of highly flattened pedipalps in males, and very long and coiled copulation ducts in females. They are likely related to Aillutticus, which also has a high, broad carapace, rounded laterally behind the posterior lateral eyes, and a slightly convex cephalic region.

== Species ==
As of July 2019 it contains five species, found only in Brazil:

- Nosferattus aegis Ruiz & Brescovit, 2005 – Brazil
- Nosferattus ciliatus Ruiz & Brescovit, 2005 – Brazil
- Nosferattus discus Ruiz & Brescovit, 2005 (type) – Brazil
- Nosferattus occultus Ruiz & Brescovit, 2005 – Brazil
- Nosferattus palmatus Ruiz & Brescovit, 2005 – Brazil
