= N. occultus =

N. occultus may refer to:

- Natronococcus occultus, a species of archaea
- Nicagus occultus, a species of beetle
- Nosferattus occultus, a species of spider
