= Amatorculus stygius =

Scientific classification
- Kingdom: Animalia
- Phylum: Arthropoda
- Subphylum: Chelicerata
- Class: Arachnida
- Order: Araneae
- Infraorder: Araneomorphae
- Family: Salticidae
- Genus: Amatorculus
- Species: A. stygius

Binomial name
- Amatorculus stygius Ruiz & Brescovit, 2005

Species of spider

Amatorculus stygius is a species of jumping spider in the family Salticidae. It is found in Brazil.
