= Nosferattus discus =

Scientific classification
- Kingdom: Animalia
- Phylum: Arthropoda
- Subphylum: Chelicerata
- Class: Arachnida
- Order: Araneae
- Infraorder: Araneomorphae
- Family: Salticidae
- Genus: Nosferattus
- Species: N. discus

Binomial name
- Nosferattus discus Ruiz & Brescovit, 2005

Species of spider

Nosferattus discus is a jumping spider.

== Etymology ==
The epitheton is Latin for "disc" and refers to the shape of the cymbium.

== Appearance ==
N. discus is about 4 mm long, with females slightly larger.

== Distribution ==
N. discus is only known from the State of Maranhão in Brazil.
