= Semiopyla =

Scientific classification
- Kingdom: Animalia
- Phylum: Arthropoda
- Subphylum: Chelicerata
- Class: Arachnida
- Order: Araneae
- Infraorder: Araneomorphae
- Family: Salticidae
- Tribe: Sitticini
- Genus: Semiopyla; Simon, 1901

Type species
- S. cataphracta Simon, 1901

Species
- S. cataphracta Simon, 1901 – Mexico to Argentina; S. triarmata Galiano, 1985 – Argentina; S. viperina Galiano, 1985 – Paraguay, Argentina

Genus of spiders

Semiopyla is a genus of jumping spiders that was first described by Eugène Louis Simon in 1901. As of August 2019 it contains only three species, found only in Paraguay, Argentina, and Mexico: S. cataphracta, S. triarmata, and S. viperina.
