= Nosferattus ciliatus =

Scientific classification
- Kingdom: Animalia
- Phylum: Arthropoda
- Subphylum: Chelicerata
- Class: Arachnida
- Order: Araneae
- Infraorder: Araneomorphae
- Family: Salticidae
- Genus: Nosferattus
- Species: N. ciliatus

Binomial name
- Nosferattus ciliatus Ruiz & Brescovit, 2005

Species of spider

Nosferattus ciliatus is a jumping spider.

== Etymology ==
The epitheton ("ciliated") refers to the ventral edge of the cymbium.

== Appearance ==
The males are about 3mm long, with a yellow carapace; no females have been described.

== Distribution ==
N. ciliatus is only known only from the State of Maranhão in Brazil.
