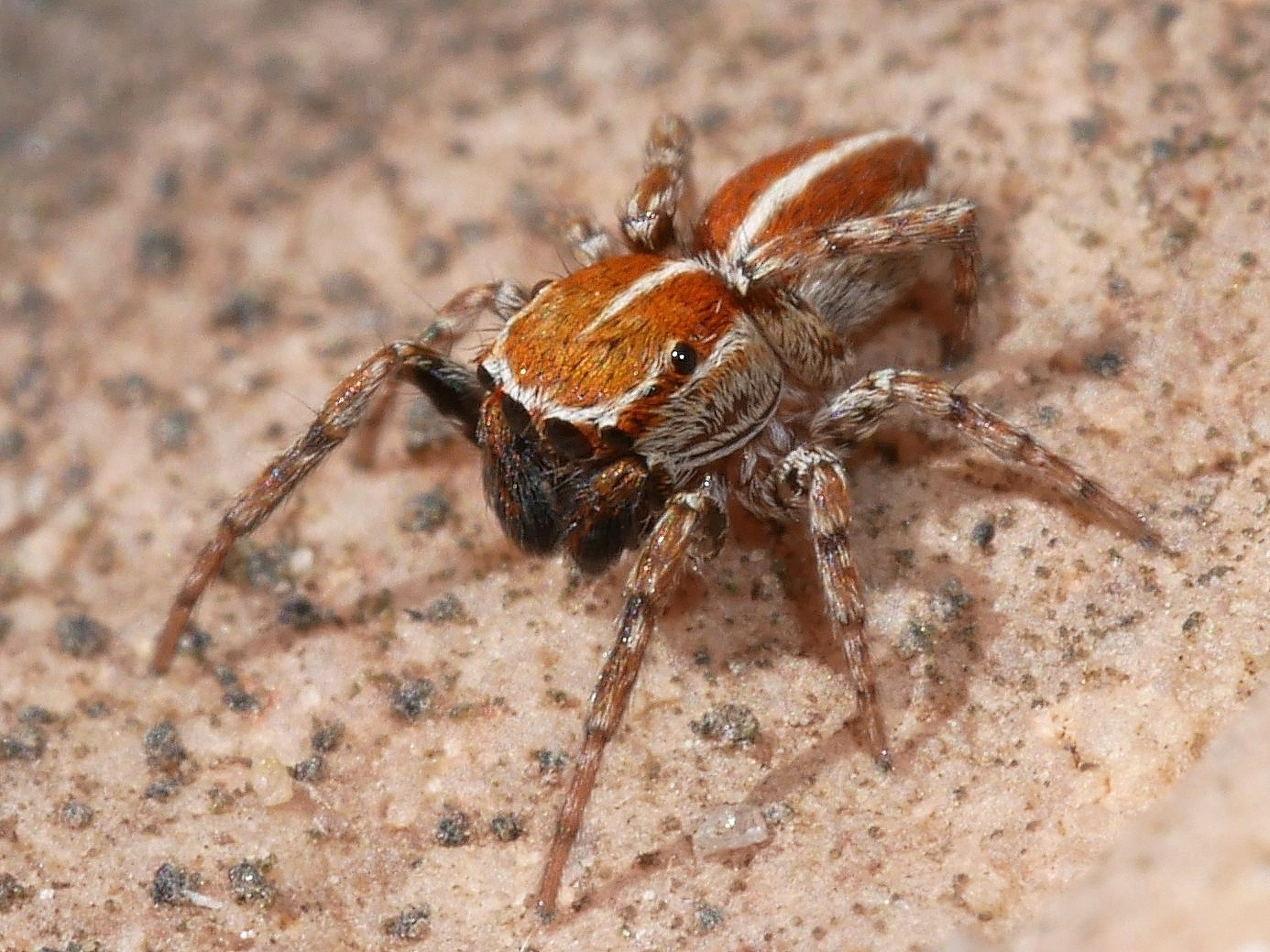
- Male
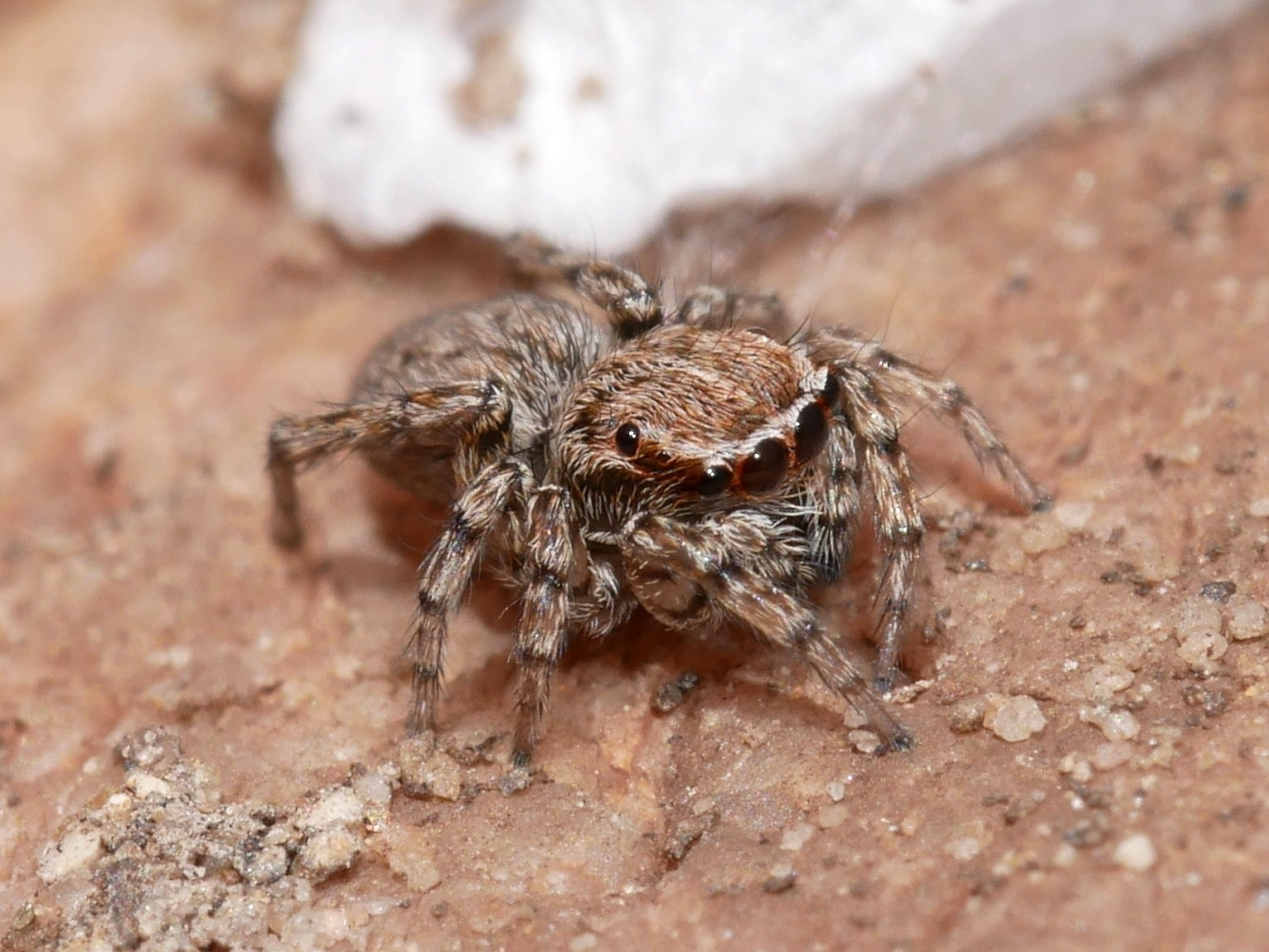
- Female

Scientific classification
- Kingdom: Animalia
- Phylum: Arthropoda
- Subphylum: Chelicerata
- Class: Arachnida
- Order: Araneae
- Infraorder: Araneomorphae
- Family: Salticidae
- Genus: Attinella
- Species: A. dorsata

Binomial name
- Attinella dorsata (Banks, 1895)

Synonyms
- Attus dorsatus Banks, 1895; Attinella dorsata (Banks, 1895); Sitticus absolutus Gertsch & Mulaik, 1936; Sitticus callidus Gertsch & Mulaik, 1936; Sitticus dorsatus (Banks, 1895), nomen dubium; Sitticus hansii Schenkel, 1951; Sittiab absolutus (Gertsch & Mulaik, 1936)

= Attinella dorsata =

Species of spider

Attinella dorsata is a species of jumping spider found in the United States and Mexico.

== Description ==
The spider is brown colored, and is 1/4 of an inch in size.
