= Amatorculus =

Scientific classification
- Kingdom: Animalia
- Phylum: Arthropoda
- Subphylum: Chelicerata
- Class: Arachnida
- Order: Araneae
- Infraorder: Araneomorphae
- Family: Salticidae
- Tribe: Sitticini
- Genus: Amatorculus; Ruiz & Brescovit, 2005

Type species
- A. stygius Ruiz & Brescovit, 2005

Species
- A. cristinae Ruiz & Brescovit, 2006 – Brazil, French Guiana; A. stygius Ruiz & Brescovit, 2005 – Brazil

Genus of spiders

Amatorculus is a genus of South American jumping spiders that was first described by G. R. S. Ruiz & Antônio Domingos Brescovit in 2005. As of June 2019 it contains only two species, found only in Brazil and French Guiana: A. cristinae and A. stygius.
