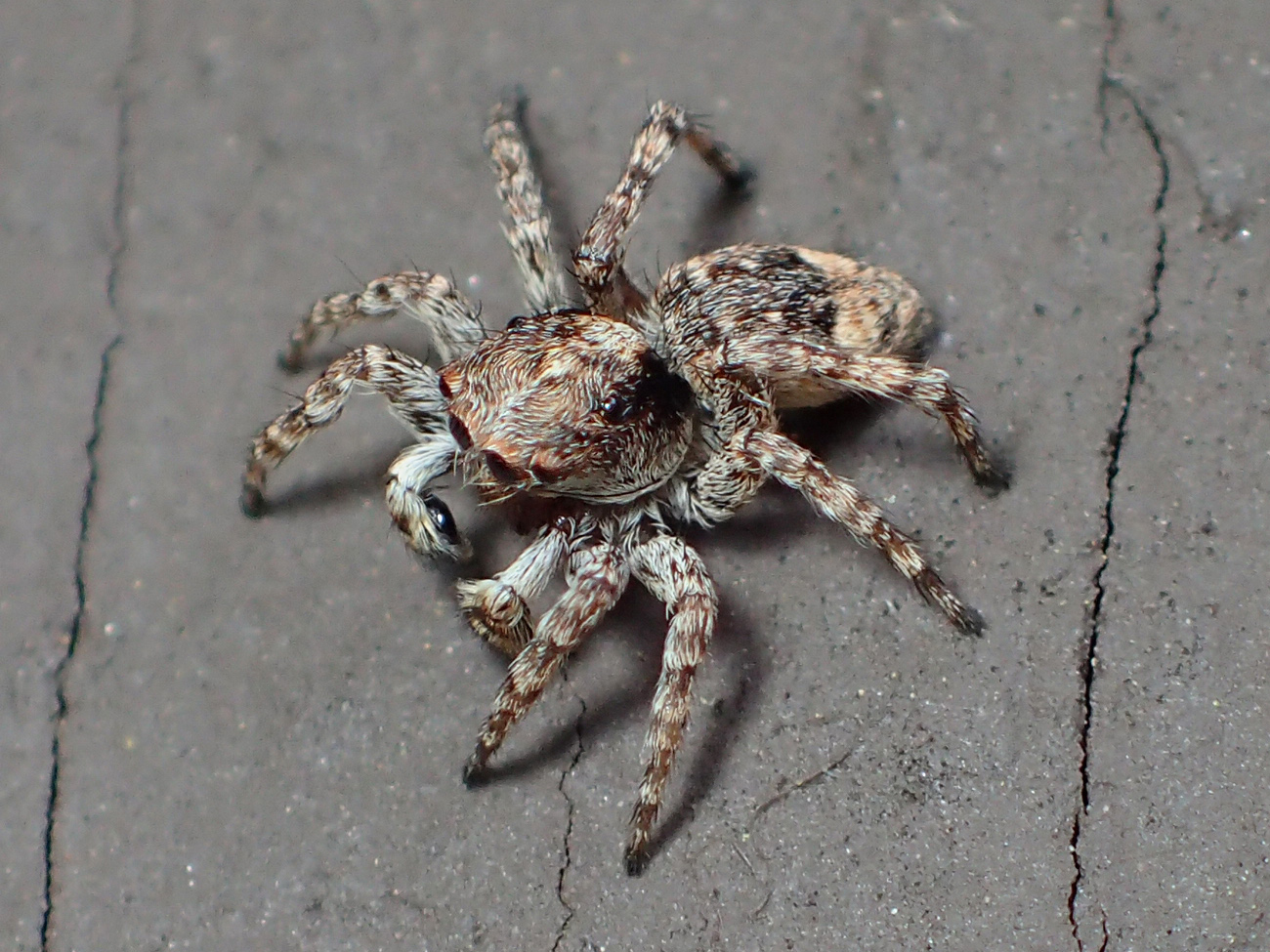
- Attulus fasciger (syn. Sitticus fasciger)

Scientific classification
- Kingdom: Animalia
- Phylum: Arthropoda
- Subphylum: Chelicerata
- Class: Arachnida
- Order: Araneae
- Infraorder: Araneomorphae
- Family: Salticidae
- Subfamily: Salticinae
- Tribe: Sitticini; Simon, 1901

Tribes and genera
- See text

= Sitticini =

Tribe of spiders

The Sitticini are a tribe of spiders in the family Salticidae (jumping spiders). The tribe has been divided into two subtribes, Aillutticina, with five Neotropical genera, and Sitticina, with five genera from Eurasia and the Americas. One genus is unplaced within the tribe. The taxonomy of the tribe has been subject to considerable uncertainty. It was clarified in 2020.

== Description ==
The group is now primarily defined by molecular phylogenetic analysis. However, members can be distinguished from other salticids by the fourth leg being much longer than the third and by the absence of the retromarginal cheliceral tooth.

== Taxonomy ==
The group was first described by Eugène Simon in 1901, under the name "Sitticeae". It was treated as the subfamily Sitticinae by various authors before being reduced to the tribe Sitticini by Wayne Maddison in 2015.

The taxonomy of the tribe has been subject to considerable uncertainty; generic boundaries were changed repeatedly between 2017 and 2020. For example, Attulus floricola was known as Sitticus floricola until moved to Sittiflor floricola in 2017, to Calositticus floricola in 2018, back to Sitticus floricola in 2019, and then to Attulus floricola in 2020. Most sitticines were placed in Sitticus until 2017, when Jerzy Prószyński split the genus into seven: Attulus, Sitticus and five new genera Sittiab, Sittiflor, Sittilong, Sittipub and Sittisax. This division was not based on a phylogenetic analysis but was intended to be "pragmatic".

A molecular phylogenetic analysis in 2020 restored most sitticine species to a single genus, Attulus (the name which has priority over Sitticus), circumscribed to include Sitticus, Sittiflor, Sittilong and Sittipub. (Prószyński's Sittisax was retained, but his Sittiab was synonymized with Attinella.) As of August 2020, the World Spider Catalog recognized 58 species in Attulus, as opposed to 15 in Jollas, one of the next largest genera in the tribe.

=== Phylogeny ===
In 2020, Maddison and co-workers divided the tribe Sitticini into two subtribes, Aillutticina and Sitticina, each with five genera, and published a cladogram showing the relationship among the genera in Sitticina:

- Sitticini
  - Aillutticina
    Aillutticus, Amatorculus, Capeta, Gavarilla, Nosferattus
  - Sitticina
    - Jollas–Tomis clade
      - - Attinella
        - Jollas
      - - Sittisax
        - Tomis
    - Attulus

=== Subtribes and genera ===
Genera included in the tribe Sitticini by Maddison and co-workers in 2020 were:

- Subtribe Aillutticina
  - Aillutticus Galiano, 1987
  - Amatorculus Ruiz & Brescovit, 2005
  - Capeta Ruiz & Brescovit, 2005
  - Gavarilla Ruiz & Brescovit, 2006
  - Nosferattus Ruiz & Brescovit, 2005
- Subtribe Sitticina
  - Attinella Banks, 1905
  - Attulus Simon, 1889
  - Jollas Simon, 1901
  - Sittisax Prószyński, 2017
  - Tomis F.O. P-Cambridge, 1901
- incertae sedis
  - Semiopyla Simon, 1901

== Distribution ==
The five genera placed in the subtribe Aillutticina are found in the Neotropics and the Caribbean. The five genera placed in the subtribe Sitticina are native to Eurasia and the rest of the Americas. The unplaced genus Semiopyla is found from Mexico to Argentina and Paraguay. It is believed that the tribe originated in the Neotropics, and diverged rapidly more recently in Eurasia, with dispersal back into the Americas.
