= Gavarilla =

Scientific classification
- Kingdom: Animalia
- Phylum: Arthropoda
- Subphylum: Chelicerata
- Class: Arachnida
- Order: Araneae
- Infraorder: Araneomorphae
- Family: Salticidae
- Tribe: Sitticini
- Genus: Gavarilla; Ruiz & Brescovit, 2006

Type species
- G. ianuzziae Ruiz & Brescovit, 2006

Species
- G. arretada Ruiz & Brescovit, 2006 – Brazil; G. ianuzziae Ruiz & Brescovit, 2006 – Brazil

Genus of spiders

Gavarilla is a genus of Brazilian jumping spiders that was first described by G. R. S. Ruiz & Antônio Domingos Brescovit in 2006. Females are 3.5 to 5 mm (0.14 to 0.20 in) long, with males 3 to 4 mm (0.12 to 0.16 in).

== Species ==
As of June 2019 it contains only two species, found only in Brazil:

- Gavarilla arretada Ruiz & Brescovit, 2006 – Brazil (Maranhão)
- Gavarilla ianuzziae Ruiz & Brescovit, 2006 – Brazil (Sergipe)
