= Nosferattus aegis =

Scientific classification
- Kingdom: Animalia
- Phylum: Arthropoda
- Subphylum: Chelicerata
- Class: Arachnida
- Order: Araneae
- Infraorder: Araneomorphae
- Family: Salticidae
- Genus: Nosferattus
- Species: N. aegis

Binomial name
- Nosferattus aegis Ruiz & Brescovit, 2005

Species of spider

Nosferattus aegis is a jumping spider.

== Name ==
The epitheton is Latin for "shield" and refers to the shape of the cymbium.

== Appearance ==
N. aegis is about 4 mm long, with females up to 5 mm.

== Distribution ==
N. aegis is only known from the State of Tocantins in Brazil.
