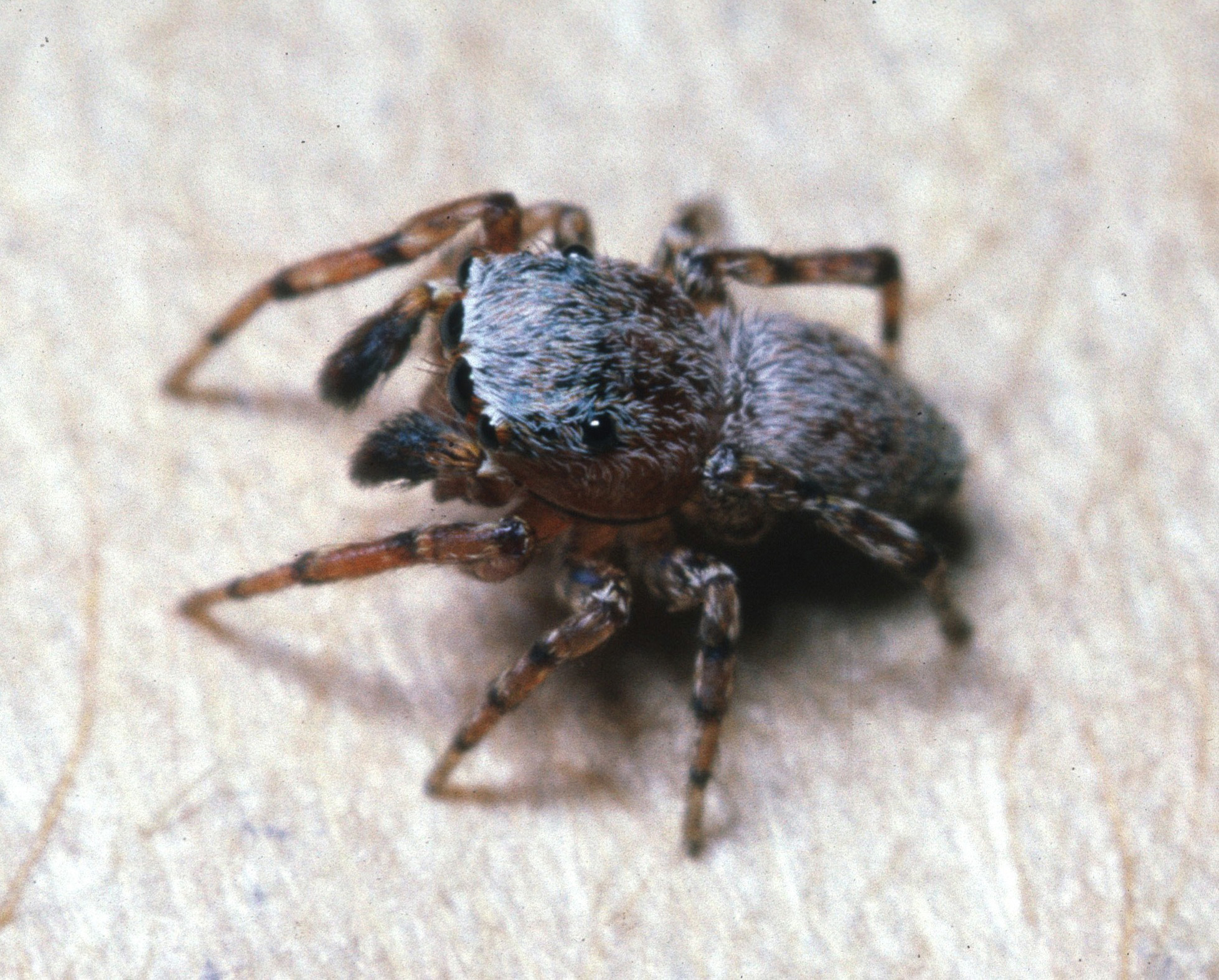

Scientific classification
- Kingdom: Animalia
- Phylum: Arthropoda
- Subphylum: Chelicerata
- Class: Arachnida
- Order: Araneae
- Infraorder: Araneomorphae
- Family: Salticidae
- Genus: Attinella
- Species: A. concolor

Binomial name
- Attinella concolor (Banks, 1895)

Synonyms
- Attus concolor Banks, 1895; Sittacus cursor Barrows, 1919; Sitticus concolor Maddison, 1996

= Attinella concolor =

Species of spider

Attinella concolor is a species of jumping spider in the family Salticidae. It is found in the United States and Mexico.

It was first described in 1895 by N. Banks.

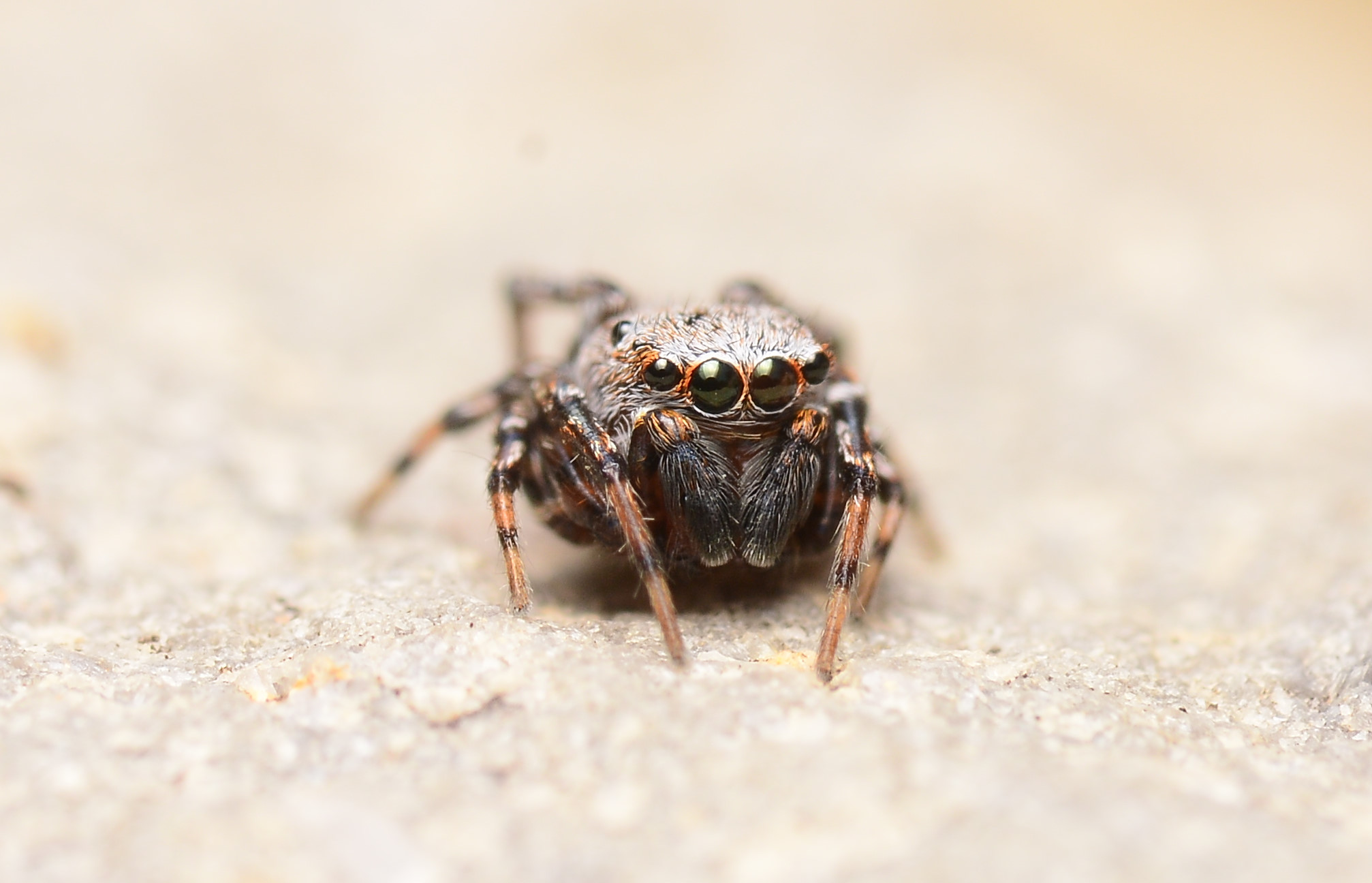
Male face

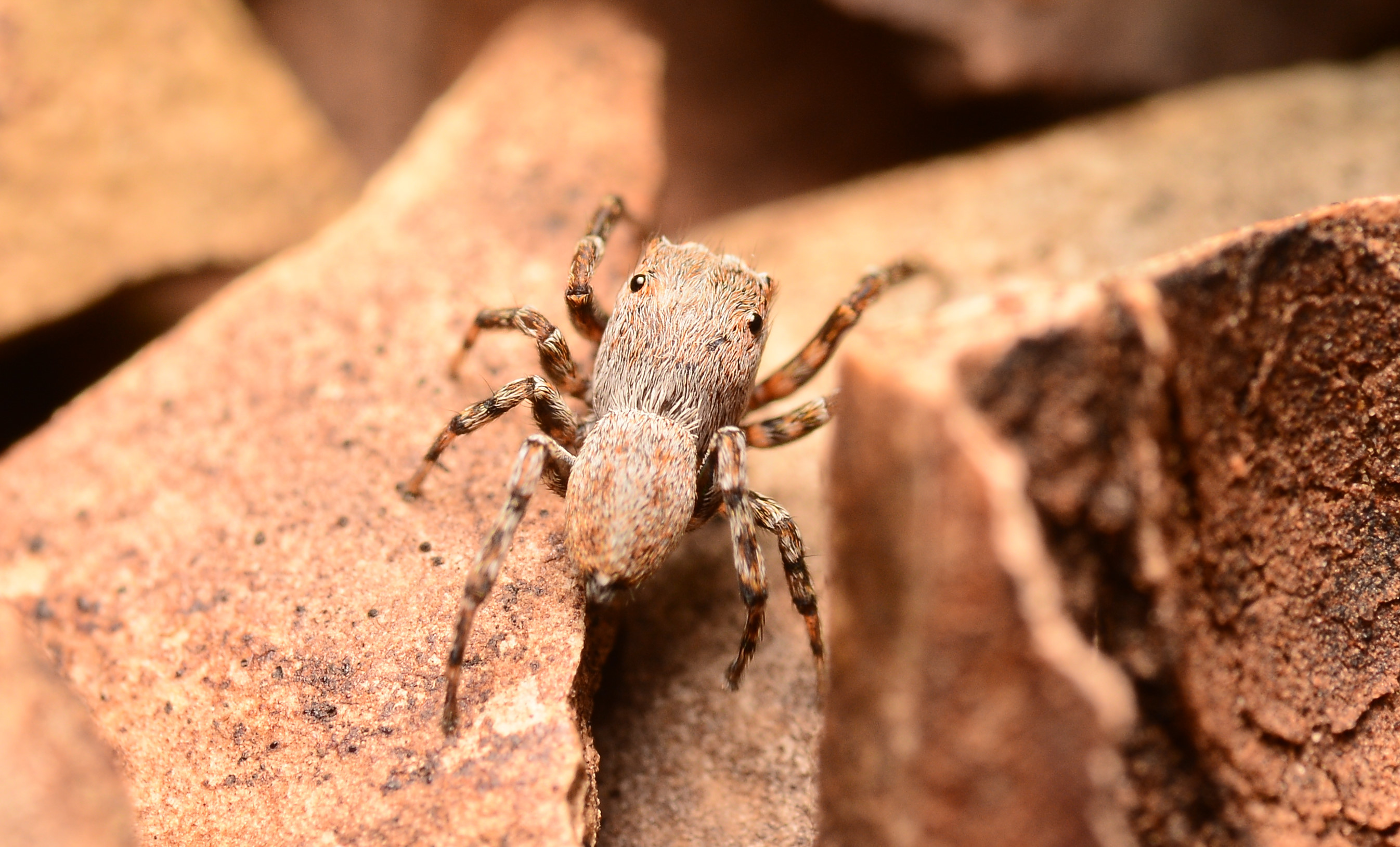
Male dorsal

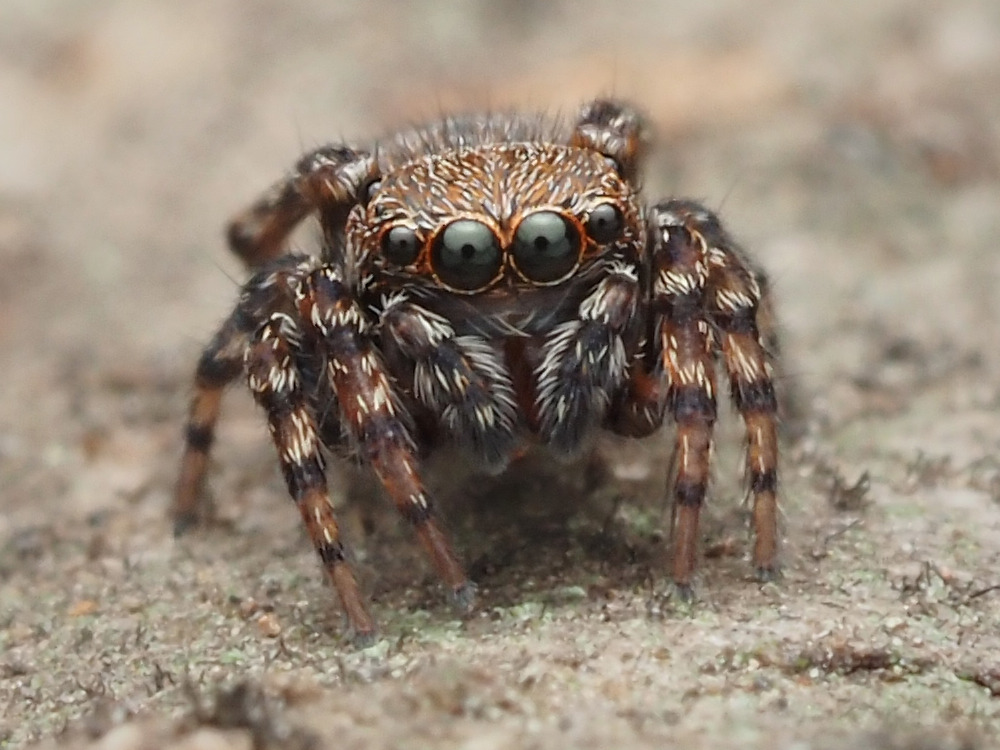
Female face

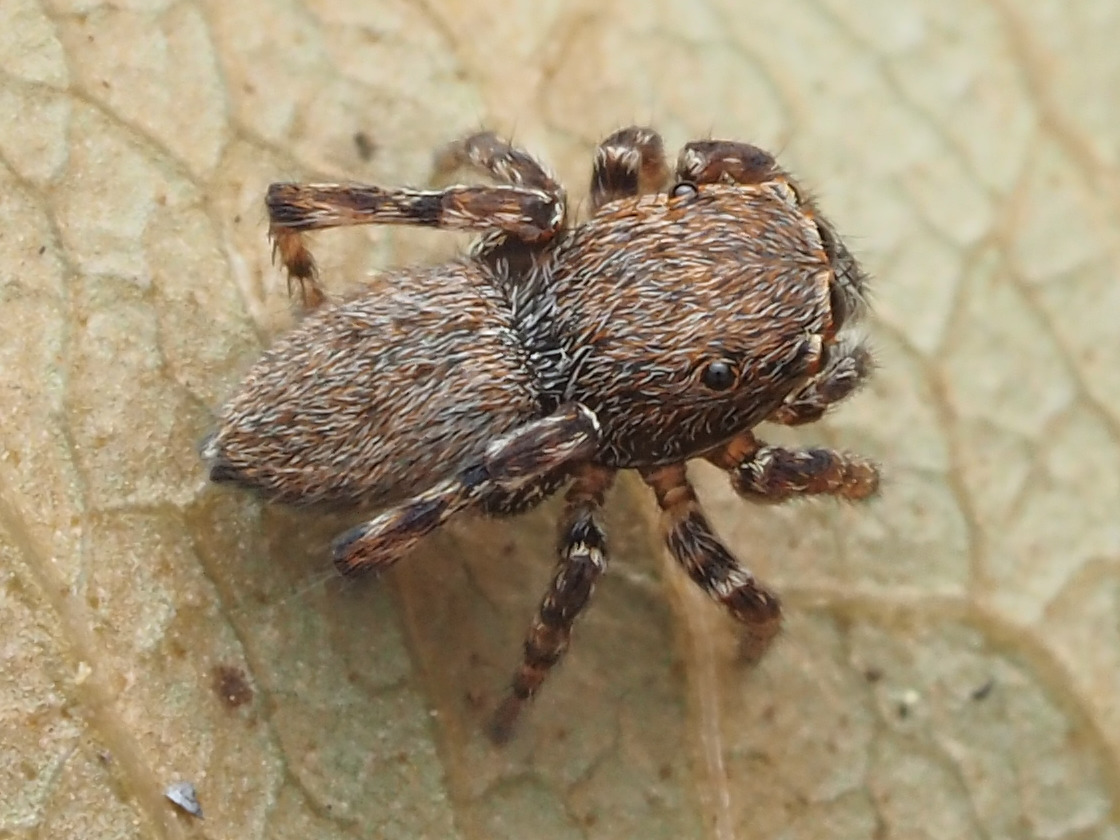
Female dorsal
