= Nosferattus palmatus =

Scientific classification
- Kingdom: Animalia
- Phylum: Arthropoda
- Subphylum: Chelicerata
- Class: Arachnida
- Order: Araneae
- Infraorder: Araneomorphae
- Family: Salticidae
- Genus: Nosferattus
- Species: N. palmatus

Binomial name
- Nosferattus palmatus Ruiz & Brescovit, 2005

Species of spider

Nosferattus palmatus is a jumping spider.

== Etymology ==
The epitheton palmatus is Latin for "webbed" and refers to the webbed palpal tibia in dorsal view.

== Appearance ==
Males are 3 mm long, females up to 4 mm.

== Distribution ==
N. palmatus is only known from the State of Sergipe in Brazil.
