= Capeta (spider) =

Scientific classification
- Kingdom: Animalia
- Phylum: Arthropoda
- Subphylum: Chelicerata
- Class: Arachnida
- Order: Araneae
- Infraorder: Araneomorphae
- Family: Salticidae
- Tribe: Sitticini
- Genus: Capeta; Ruiz & Brescovit, 2005

Type species
- Capeta tridens Ruiz & Brescovit, 2005

Species
- See text.

Genus of spiders

Capeta is a genus of spiders in the family Salticidae (jumping spiders).

== Name ==
Capeta is a Brazilian word for devil. tridens ("trident") refers to the three projections in the male palp seen in ventral view (the embolus, its basal projection and the retrolateral tibial apophysis).

== Species ==
- Capeta cachimbo Ruiz & Brescovit, 2006
- Capeta tridens Ruiz & Brescovit, 2005

== Distribution ==
C. tridens is only known from the State of Bahia in Brazil, while C. cachimbo was found in the Serra do Cachimbo, Pará.
