= Aillutticus =

Scientific classification
- Kingdom: Animalia
- Phylum: Arthropoda
- Subphylum: Chelicerata
- Class: Arachnida
- Order: Araneae
- Infraorder: Araneomorphae
- Family: Salticidae
- Tribe: Sitticini
- Genus: Aillutticus; Galiano, 1987

Type species
- A. nitens Galiano, 1987

Species
- 8, see text

Genus of spiders

Aillutticus is a genus of South American jumping spiders that was first described by María Elena Galiano in 1987.

== Species ==
As of June 2019 it contains eight species, found only in Argentina and Brazil:

- Aillutticus knysakae Ruiz & Brescovit, 2006 – Brazil
- Aillutticus montanus Ruiz & Brescovit, 2006 – Brazil
- Aillutticus nitens Galiano, 1987 (type) – Argentina, Brazil
- Aillutticus pinquidor Galiano, 1987 – Argentina
- Aillutticus raizeri Ruiz & Brescovit, 2006 – Brazil
- Aillutticus rotundus Galiano, 1987 – Brazil
- Aillutticus soteropolitano Ruiz & Brescovit, 2006 – Brazil
- Aillutticus viripotens Ruiz & Brescovit, 2006 – Brazil
