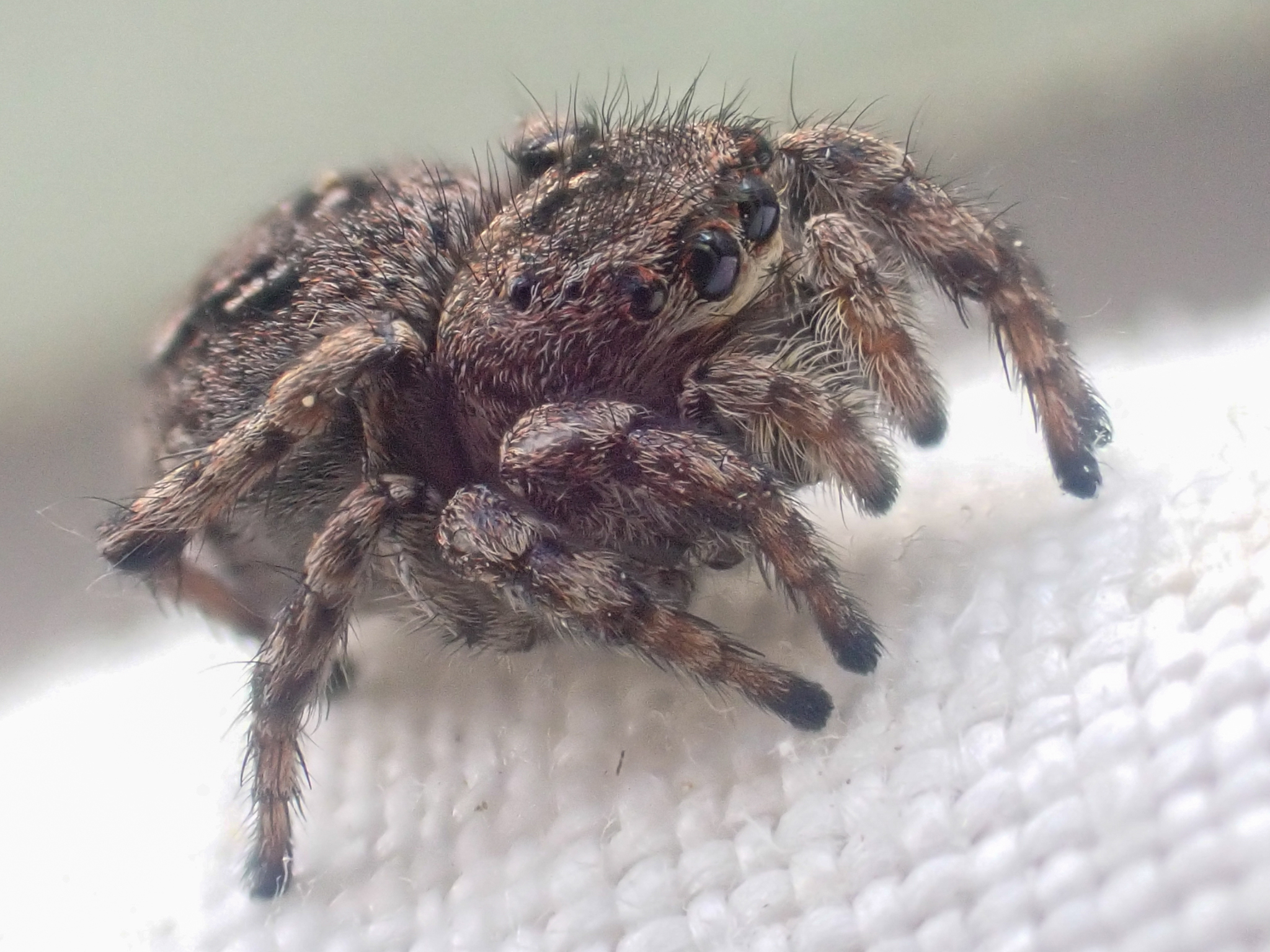
- Sittisax ranieri

Scientific classification
- Kingdom: Animalia
- Phylum: Arthropoda
- Subphylum: Chelicerata
- Class: Arachnida
- Order: Araneae
- Infraorder: Araneomorphae
- Family: Salticidae
- Tribe: Sitticini
- Genus: Sittisax; Prószyński, 2017

Diversity
- 2 species

= Sittisax =

Genus of spiders

Sittisax is a genus of spiders in the family Salticidae (jumping spiders).

== Taxonomy ==
Sittisax is one of a number of genera that were split off from the broadly defined genus Sitticus (now Attulus) by Jerzy Prószyński in 2016 and 2017. Sittisax was erected in 2017, with the type species Euophrys saxicola. The generic name is derived from the first parts of the generic and specific names of Sitticus saxicola, the name used for the type species before transfer to Sittisax.

=== Species ===
As of August 2020, the World Spider Catalog accepted the following species:

- Sittisax ranieri (Peckham & Peckham, 1909) – Holarctic
- Sittisax saxicola (C. L. Koch, 1846) (type species) – Palearctic
