= Nosferattus occultus =

Scientific classification
- Kingdom: Animalia
- Phylum: Arthropoda
- Subphylum: Chelicerata
- Class: Arachnida
- Order: Araneae
- Infraorder: Araneomorphae
- Family: Salticidae
- Genus: Nosferattus
- Species: N. occultus

Binomial name
- Nosferattus occultus Ruiz & Brescovit, 2005

Species of spider

Nosferattus occultus is a jumping spider.

== Etymology ==
The epithet is Latin for "hidden" and refers to the embolus, which is hidden behind the edge of the tegulum.

== Appearance ==
Males of N. occultus can be easily distinguished from the remaining species of the genus by the length of the embolus, coiled 3.5 times around the tegulum, and other characteristics.

Males are almost 4 mm long, with females slightly larger.

== Distribution ==
N. occultus occurs in the States of Maranhão and Ceará in Brazil.
