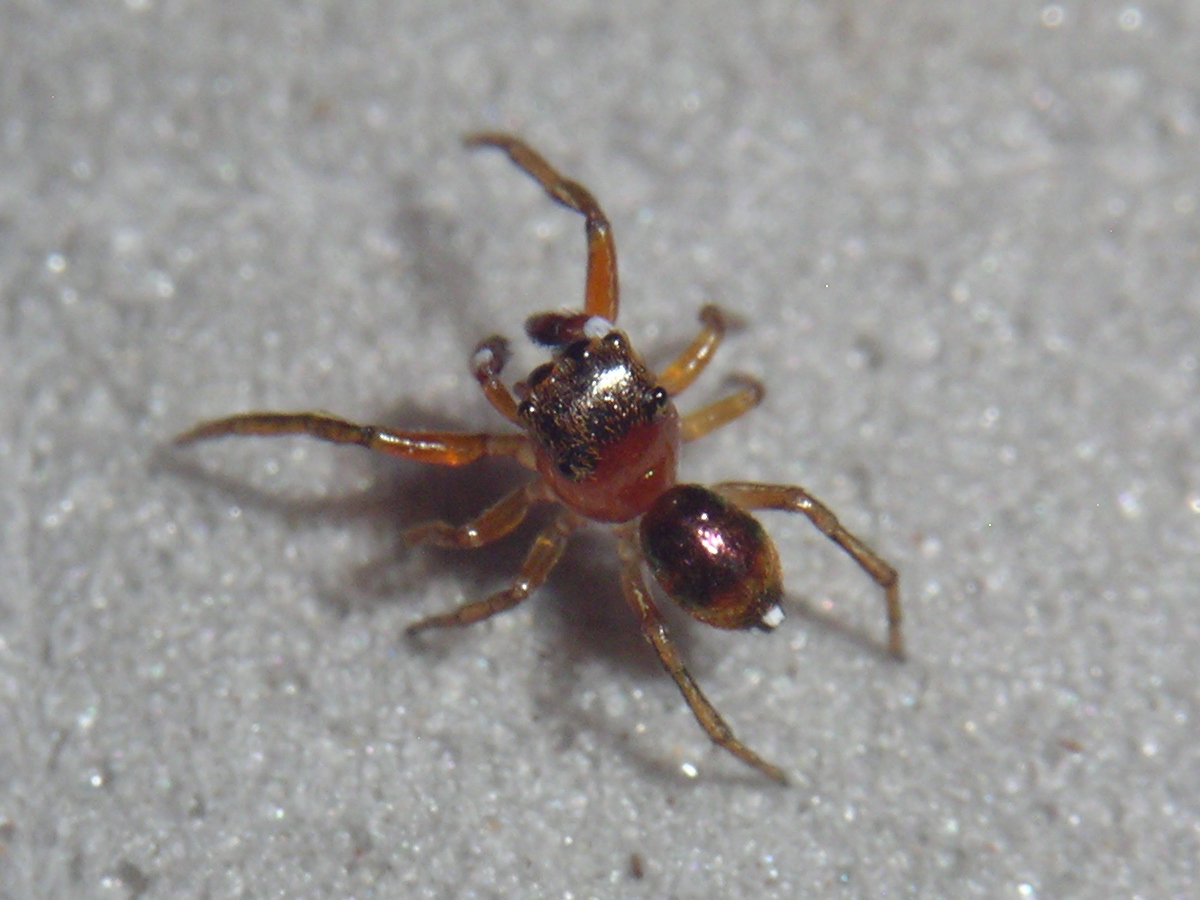
- Adult male Jollas cupreus from Ecuador

Scientific classification
- Kingdom: Animalia
- Phylum: Arthropoda
- Subphylum: Chelicerata
- Class: Arachnida
- Order: Araneae
- Infraorder: Araneomorphae
- Family: Salticidae
- Tribe: Sitticini
- Genus: Jollas; Simon, 1901

Type species
- Jollas geniculatus Simon, 1901

Diversity
- 11 species

Synonyms
- Oningis Simon, 1901

= Jollas =

Genus of spiders

Jollas is a genus of jumping spiders (Salticidae), found in Central America, the Caribbean and South America.

== Species ==
As of April 2017, the World Spider Catalog accepted the following species:

- Jollas amazonicus Galiano, 1991 – Brazil
- Jollas armatus (Bryant, 1943) – Hispaniola
- Jollas crassus (Bryant, 1943) – Hispaniola
- Jollas cupreus Maddison, 2020 – Ecuador
- Jollas geniculatus Simon, 1901 – Panama, Trinidad, Colombia, Venezuela, Guyana
- Jollas hawkeswoodi Makhan, 2007 – Suriname
- Jollas manantiales Galiano, 1991 – Argentina
- Jollas minutus (Petrunkevitch, 1930) – Puerto Rico
- Jollas paranacito Galiano, 1991 – Argentina
- Jollas pompatus (Peckham & Peckham, 1893) – Panama, St. Vincent
- Jollas puntalara Galiano, 1991 – Argentina
- Jollas richardwellsi Makhan, 2009 – Suriname

Jollas lahorensis (Dyal, 1935), said to be from Pakistan, is regarded as a doubtful name (nomen dubium).
