= Tomis (spider) =

Scientific classification
- Kingdom: Animalia
- Phylum: Arthropoda
- Subphylum: Chelicerata
- Class: Arachnida
- Order: Araneae
- Infraorder: Araneomorphae
- Family: Salticidae
- Tribe: Sitticini
- Genus: Tomis; F.O. Pickard-Cambridge, 1901

Type species
- Tomis palpalis F.O. Pickard-Cambridge, 1901

Species
- See text.

Synonyms
- Pseudattulus Caporiacco, 1947

Genus of spiders

Tomis is a genus of South American jumping spiders that was first described by F.O. Pickard-Cambridge in 1901. The genus Pseudattulus, erected by Lodovico di Caporiacco in 1947, was formerly considered distinct with two species, but was placed in synonymy in 2020 when Tomis was re-separated from Sitticus (now Attulus).

== Species ==
As of August 2020, the World Spider Catalog accepted the following extant species:

- Tomis beieri (Caporiacco, 1955) (syn. Pseudattulus beieri) – Venezuela
- Tomis canus Galiano, 1977 (syn. Sitticus canus) – Peru
- Tomis kratochvili (Caporiacco, 1947) (syn. Pseudattulus kratochvili) – Venezuela, Guyana
- Tomis manabita W. Maddison, 2020 – Ecuador
- Tomis mazorcanus (Chamberlin, 1920) (syn. Sitticus mazorcanus) – Peru
- Tomis mona (Bryant, 1947) – Puerto Rico
- Tomis palpalis F. O. Pickard-Cambridge, 1901 (type species) (syn. Sitticus palpalis) – Mexico, Argentina
- Tomis pavidus (Bryant, 1942) – Virgin Is.
- Tomis phaleratus (Galiano & Baert, 1990) (syn. Sitticus phaleratus) – Ecuador (Galapagos Is.)
- Tomis pintanus (Edwards & Baert, 2018) (syn. Sitticus pintanus) – Ecuador (Galapagos Is.)
- Tomis tenebricus (Galiano & Baert, 1990) (syn. Sitticus tenebricus) – Ecuador (Galapagos Is.)
- Tomis trisetosus (Edwards & Baert, 2018) (syn. Sitticus trisetosus) – Ecuador (Galapagos Is.)
- Tomis uber (Galiano & Baert, 1990) (syn. Sitticus uber) – Ecuador (Galapagos Is.)
- Tomis vanvolsemorum (Baert, 2011) (syn. Sitticus vanvolsemorum) – Ecuador (Galapagos Is.)
- Tomis welchi (Gertsch & Mulaik, 1936) (syn. Sitticus welchi) – United States
