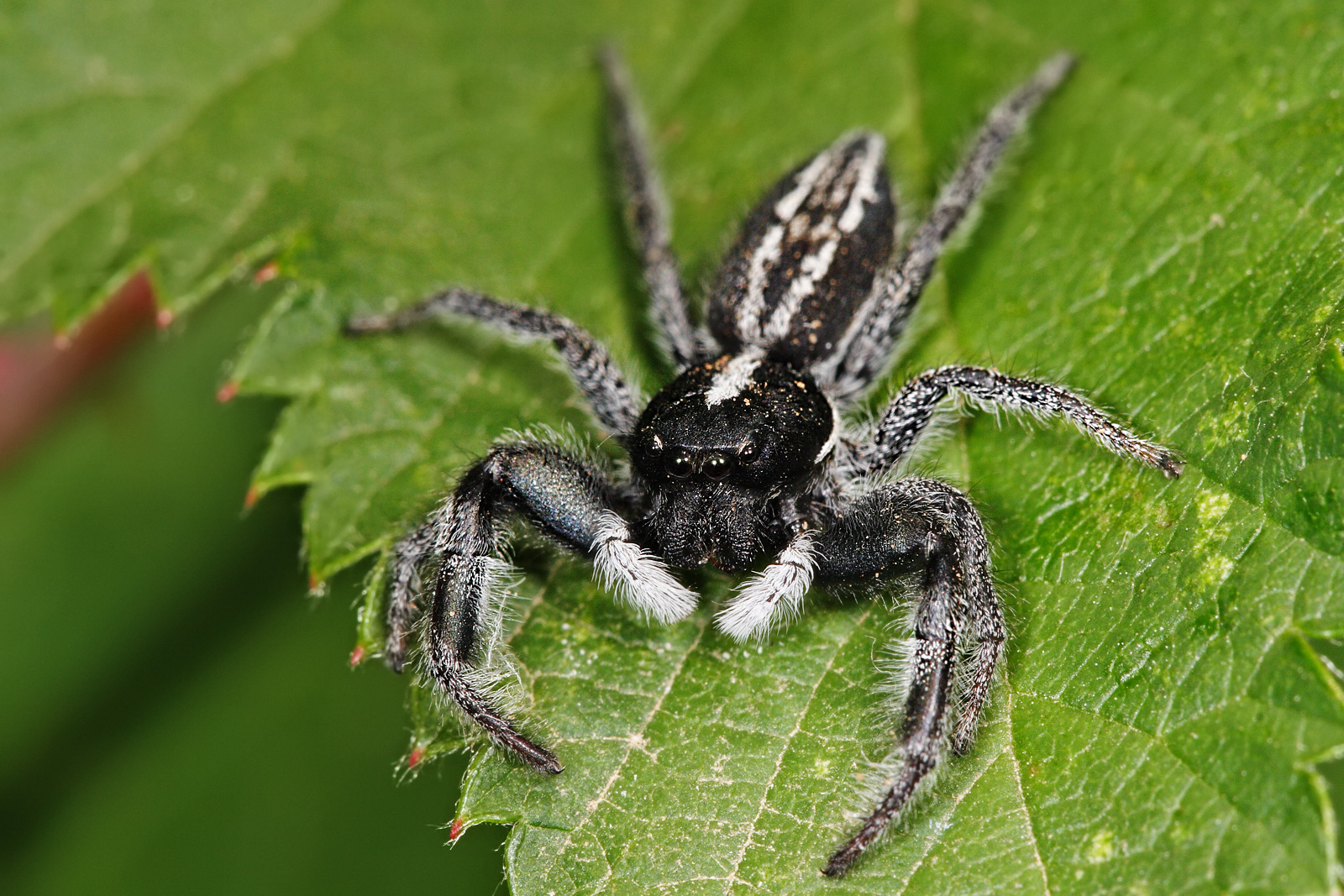
- Ocrisiona leucocomis

Scientific classification
- Kingdom: Animalia
- Phylum: Arthropoda
- Subphylum: Chelicerata
- Class: Arachnida
- Order: Araneae
- Infraorder: Araneomorphae
- Family: Salticidae
- Subfamily: Salticinae
- Genus: Ocrisiona; Simon, 1901

Type species
- Marptusa leucocomis (L. Koch, 1879)

Species
- 13, see text

= Ocrisiona =

Genus of spiders

Ocrisiona is a genus of jumping spiders that was first described by Eugène Louis Simon in 1901. O. frenata from Hong Kong belongs to a different, unspecified genus, according to Marek Żabka (1990). Eugene Simon places the genus Ocrisiona close to Holoplatys.

== Species ==
As of November 2022 it contains thirteen species, found in China, Hong Kong, New Zealand, and Australia:

- Ocrisiona aerata (L. Koch, 1879) – Australia (Queensland)
- Ocrisiona cinerea (L. Koch, 1879) – New Zealand
- Ocrisiona eucalypti Zabka, 1990 – Australia (Queensland)
- Ocrisiona koahi Zabka, 1990 – Australia (Queensland)
- Ocrisiona leucocomis (L. Koch, 1879) (type) – Australia, New Zealand
- Ocrisiona liturata (L. Koch, 1879) – Australia (Queensland)
- Ocrisiona melancholica (L. Koch, 1879) – Eastern Australia, Lord Howe Is.
- Ocrisiona melanopyga Simon, 1901 – Australia (Tasmania)
- Ocrisiona parallelestriata (L. Koch, 1879) – Australia (Queensland)
- Ocrisiona parmeliae Zabka, 1990 – Australia (Western Australia)
- Ocrisiona suilingensis Peng, Liu & Kim, 1999 – China
- Ocrisiona victoriae Zabka, 1990 – Australia (Victoria)
- Ocrisiona yakatunyae Zabka, 1990 – Australia (Western Australia)

Transferred to other genera

- Ocrisiona jovialis (L. Koch, 1879) → Apricia jovialis
- Ocrisiona frenata (Simon, 1901) → Kelawakaju frenata
