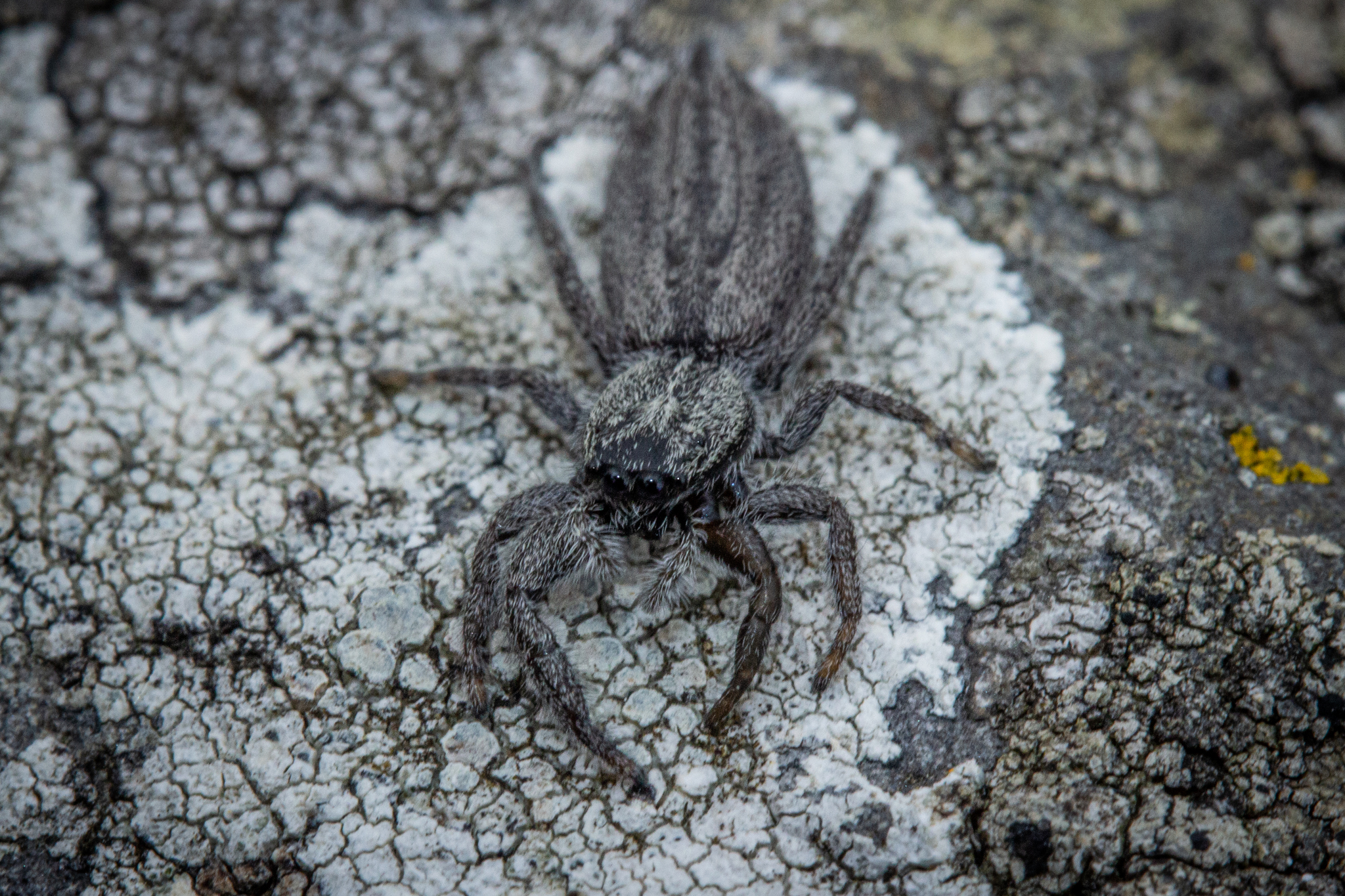

Scientific classification
- Kingdom: Animalia
- Phylum: Arthropoda
- Subphylum: Chelicerata
- Class: Arachnida
- Order: Araneae
- Infraorder: Araneomorphae
- Family: Salticidae
- Genus: Holoplatys
- Species: H. apressus

Binomial name
- Holoplatys apressus (Powell, 1873)

Synonyms
- Salticus apressus Powell, 1873 Holoplatys senilis Dalmas, 1917

= Holoplatys apressus =

Species of spider

Holoplatys apressus is a species of jumping spider endemic to New Zealand.

== Description ==
Holoplatys apressus are small with an unusually flat body (Which has been attributed to their habitat preference of small spaces under bark) that is typically black-brown with grey hairs covering the body. Adult males may have longitudinal black stripes along their abdomen.

== Taxonomy ==
Holoplatys apressus was first described as Salticus appresus in 1873. Independently, Raymond Comte de Dalmas described Holoplatys senilis in 1917. In 2002, S. appresus was moved to the Holoplatys genus and H. senilis was recognized as a synonym.

== Habitat ==
Holoplatys apressus can be found under the bark of Manuka and Kanuka trees. Some individuals have been found under the bark of exotic Pinus radiata and on driftwood, which has been suggested to imply that the species could have rafted from Australia.
