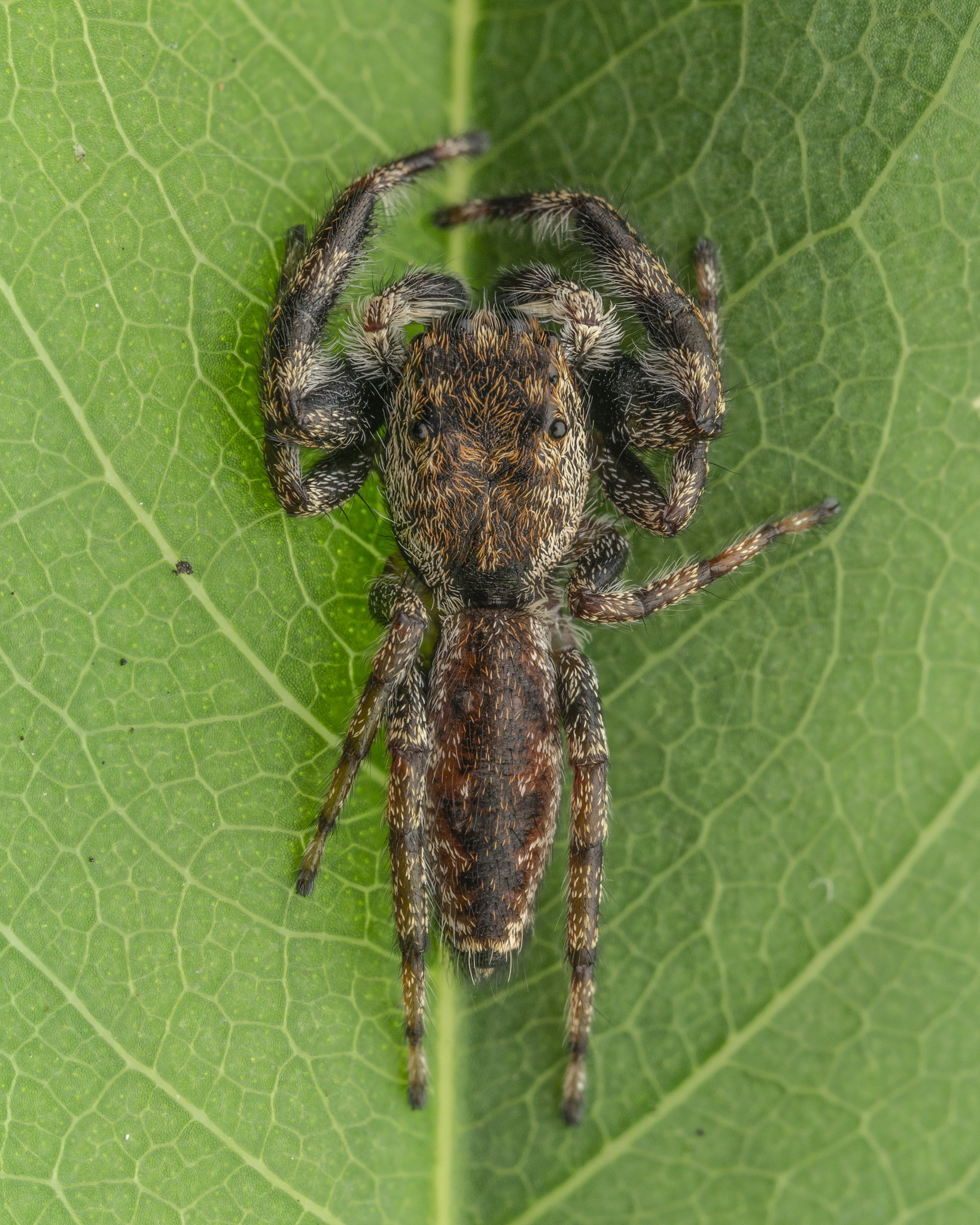
- female from Hong Kong
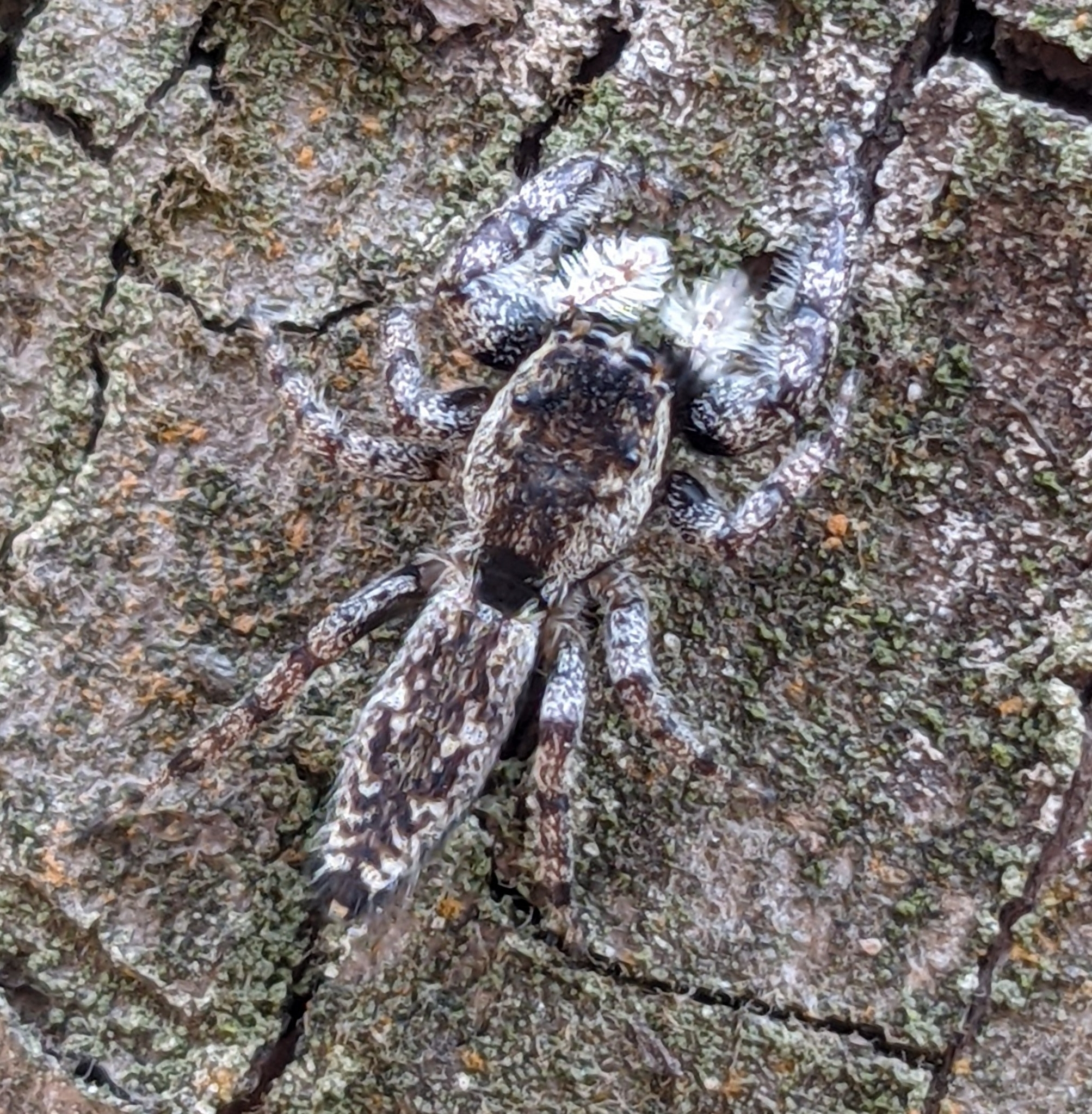
- male from Hong Kong

Scientific classification
- Kingdom: Animalia
- Phylum: Arthropoda
- Subphylum: Chelicerata
- Class: Arachnida
- Order: Araneae
- Infraorder: Araneomorphae
- Family: Salticidae
- Genus: Kelawakaju
- Species: K. frenata

Binomial name
- Kelawakaju frenata (Simon, 1901)

Synonyms
- Ocrisiona frenata Simon, 1901

= Kelawakaju frenata =

Species of spider

Kelawakaju frenata is a species of jumping spider in the genus Kelawakaju. It was originally described as Ocrisiona frenata by Eugène Simon in 1901 and was transferred to the genus Kelawakaju in 2022. The species is endemic to China.

The species name is from Latin frenata "bridled".

== Taxonomy ==
The species was first described by Eugène Simon in 1901 as Ocrisiona frenata based on a male specimen from Hong Kong. The holotype was reportedly lost and could not be found in collections in Paris or Oxford.

In 2022, Wayne Maddison and colleagues transferred the species to the newly established genus Kelawakaju based on morphological analysis, where it serves as one of the founding species of this Asian lineage of marpissine jumping spiders. The female was first described in this 2022 revision.

== Distribution ==
K. frenata has been recorded from southern China, including the provinces of Guangdong, Guangxi, and Hainan, as well as Hong Kong. Specimens have been collected from various locations including Shenzhen, Guangzhou, and several counties in Hainan Province. There are confirmed observations from Taiwan.

== Description ==
Kelawakaju frenata is a medium-sized jumping spider with males measuring 2.54–3.23 mm in cephalothorax length and females measuring 3.14–3.78 mm. The cephalothorax displays relatively irregular bands formed by dense white scales on the dorsal lateral sides, extending from behind the anterior lateral eyes to the posterior edge. The opisthosoma features inclined white scale bands near the posterior on lateral sides.

Males can be distinguished by their bright pedipalps covered with dense white scales and long white setae, particularly on the patella, tibia, and cymbium. The male palpal bulb has a distinctive embolus that is initially vertical from the basal plate, then inclines retrolaterally, with characteristic keels on the retro-ventral and pro-dorsal sides.

Females lack the white scales on the chelicerae that are present in males and have a distinctive epigyne with shallow atrial rims and ellipsoid spermathecae that are close together medially but separate and expand toward the distal end.

The species closely resembles K. pomo but can be distinguished by several morphological features, including the absence of a retro-dorsal keel on the male embolus and differences in the female atrial septum structure.
