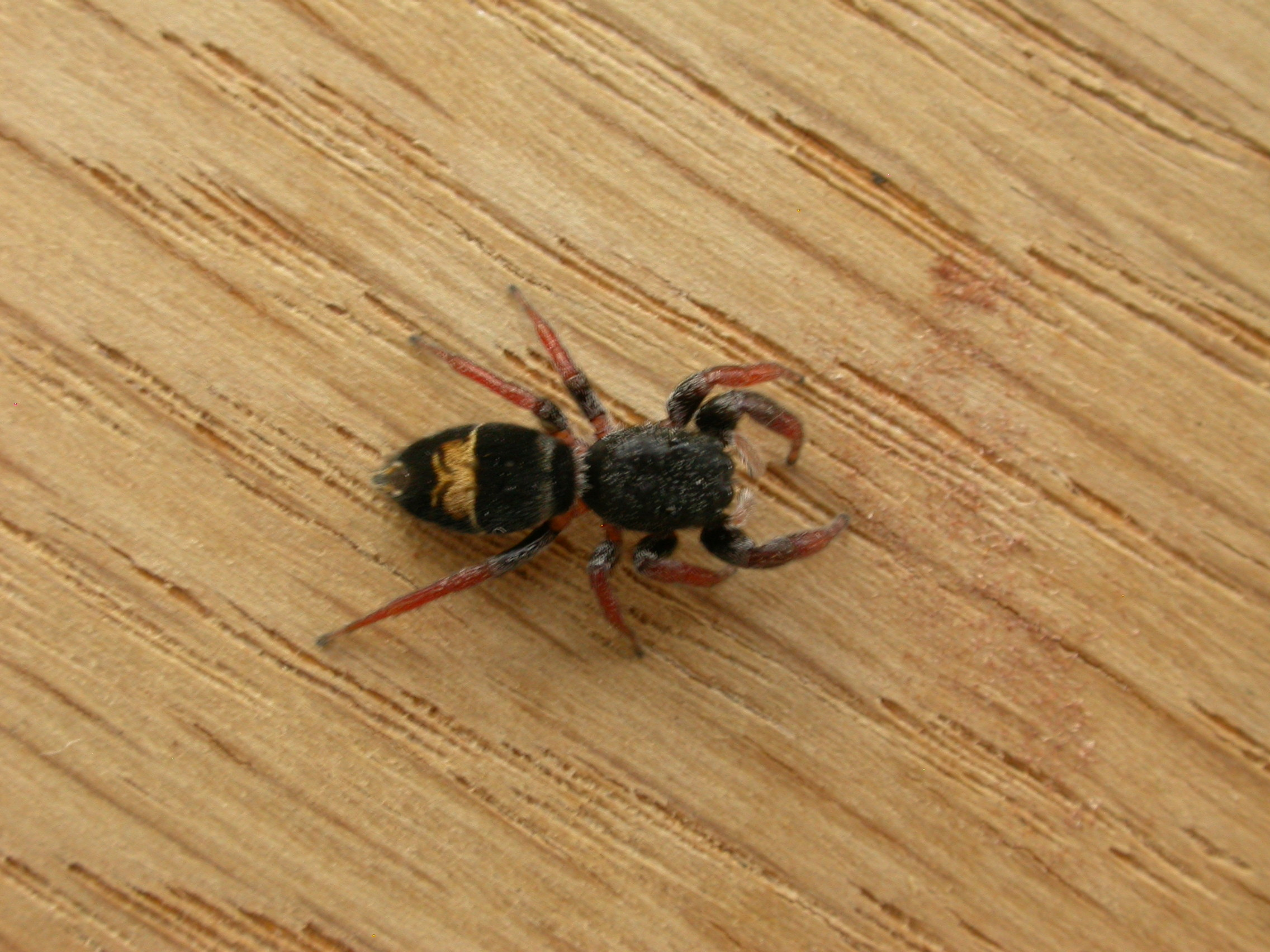
- Apricia jovialis

Scientific classification
- Kingdom: Animalia
- Phylum: Arthropoda
- Subphylum: Chelicerata
- Class: Arachnida
- Order: Araneae
- Infraorder: Araneomorphae
- Family: Salticidae
- Subfamily: Salticinae
- Genus: Apricia; Richardson, 2016

Type species
- Apricia jovialis

Species
- Apricia bracteata (L. Koch, 1879); Apricia jovialis (L. Koch, 1879); Apricia longipalpis Richardson, 2016

= Apricia =

Genus of spiders

Apricia is a genus of spiders in the jumping spider family Salticidae. It was first described in 2016 by Richardson. As of 2017, it contains 3 species, all from Australia.

Richardson placed the genus in the Salticoida clade of the subfamily Salticinae (tribe Viciriini).
