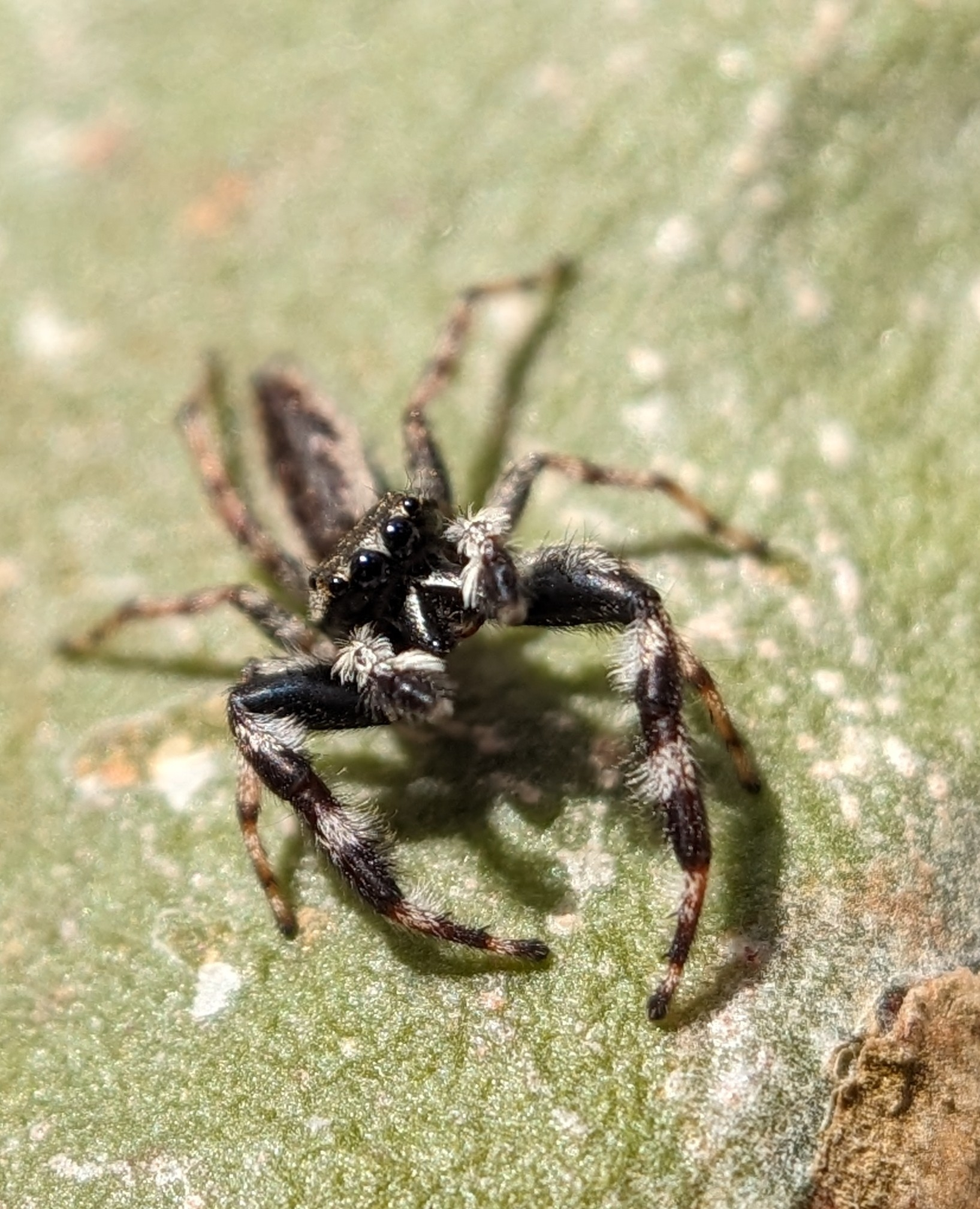
- K. sahyadri from India
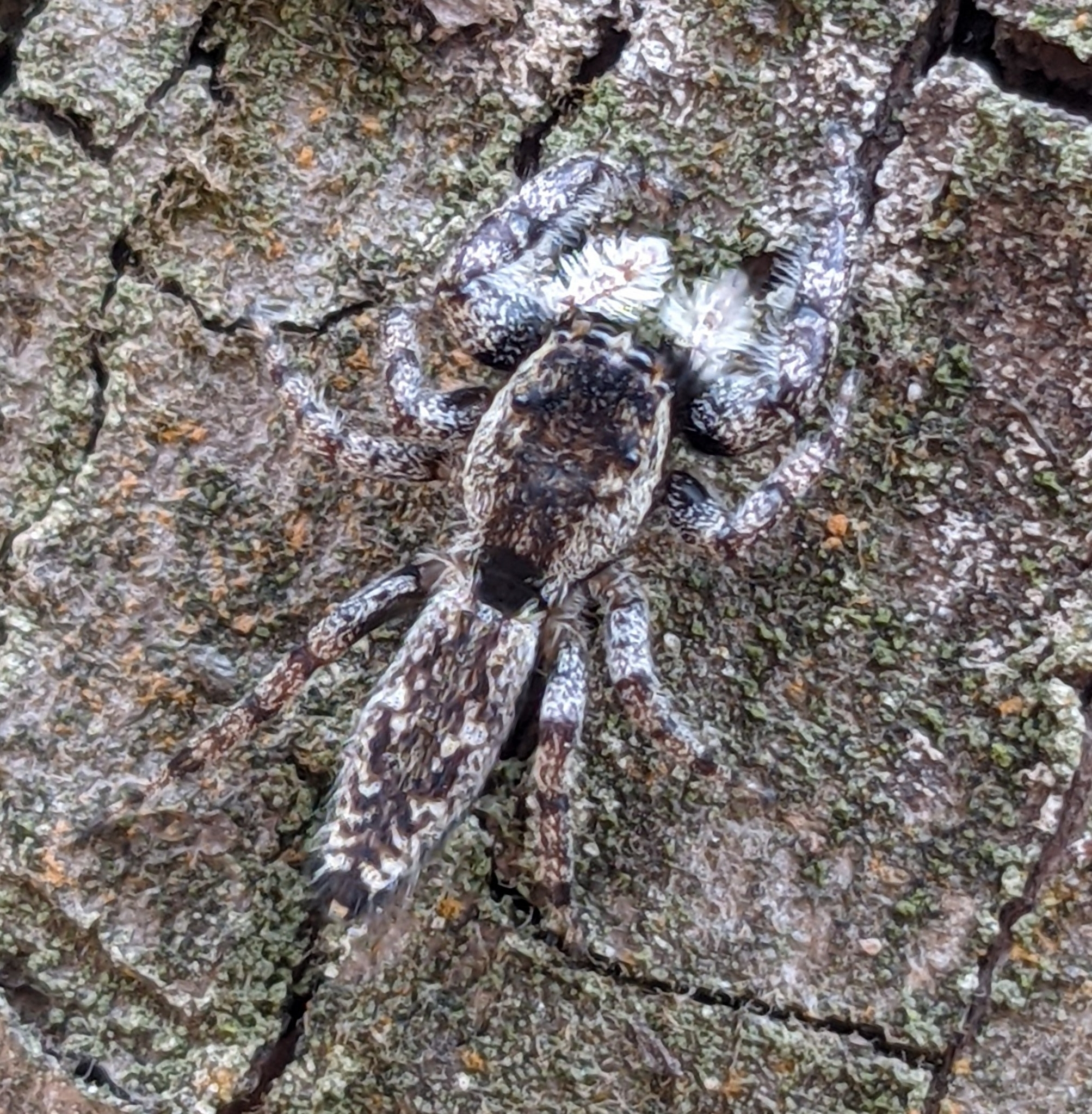
- K. frenata from Hong Kong

Scientific classification
- Kingdom: Animalia
- Phylum: Arthropoda
- Subphylum: Chelicerata
- Class: Arachnida
- Order: Araneae
- Infraorder: Araneomorphae
- Family: Salticidae
- Subtribe: Marpissina
- Genus: Kelawakaju; Maddison & Ruiz, 2022

Type species
- Kelawakaju mulu Maddison & Ruiz, 2022

Diversity
- 9 species

= Kelawakaju =

Genus of jumping spiders

Kelawakaju is a genus of jumping spiders in the family Salticidae. The genus was established in 2022 to accommodate a distinctive Asian lineage of marpissine jumping spiders that are adapted for life on tree bark. All species are elongate and flat-bodied, making them well-camouflaged against tree trunks where they hunt.

== Etymology ==
The genus name Kelawakaju means "tree spider" in the Berawan language from the area of Long Terawan, Sarawak, where the first specimens of the type species K. mulu were discovered. The name combines kelawak (spider) and kaju or kajuh (tree).

== Description ==
Kelawakaju spiders are characterized by their elongate and flat body form. The cephalothorax is flattened and varies from narrower to broader depending on the species group. Males typically have enlarged or elongated chelicerae, which is distinctive within the marpissines.

The male pedipalps feature a long, blade-like retrolateral tibial apophysis that is more or less straight and parallel to the axis of the palp. The embolus is relatively short compared to other marpissines and arises terminally on the bulb. The opisthosoma is long and narrow, contributing to the overall elongate appearance.

The coloration provides cryptic camouflage suitable for tree trunk habitats, with patterns that are either mottled or feature low-contrast longitudinal bands. Some species display distinctive narrow vertical lines of pale scales on the lower thorax, resembling similar markings found in some baviine and gophoine spiders.

== Distribution and habitat ==
The genus is distributed across tropical Asia, with species recorded from China, Malaysia, Singapore, India, and Japan. Members of Kelawakaju are specialized for living on tree bark, where their flattened body form and cryptic coloration provide excellent camouflage. Different species groups may prefer different microhabitats, with some favoring more shaded forest environments while others are found on large trees in clearings.

== Phylogeny ==
Molecular phylogenetic analysis using four gene regions (28S, Actin 5C, 16SND1, and COI) supports Kelawakaju as a monophyletic group within the Marpissina. The genus represents a separate dispersal of marpissines from the Americas to Eurasia, distinct from the Marpissa-Mendoza lineage. This suggests that marpissines colonized the Old World at least twice independently.

== Species groups ==
The genus is divided into three species groups based on morphological characteristics:

=== mulu species group ===
The mulu group includes smaller-bodied species with mottled markings and narrow chelicerae that project forward in males. Species in this group include K. mulu and K. intexta, both from Borneo. Members of this group appear to prefer more shaded forest habitats.

=== singapura species group ===
The singapura group contains only K. singapura from Singapore, which is distinctive for its robust male chelicerae, short and stout embolus, and long palpal tibia. It shares some characteristics with both other groups but maintains distinct features.

=== frenata species group ===
The frenata group includes the relatively large-bodied species K. frenata, K. leucomelas and K. sahyadri. These species are characterized by pale longitudinal bands on the body sides and proportionately shorter ocular quadrangles. Some members of this group have been found on large trees in exposed clearings.

== Species ==
As of 2025, the genus contains nine described species:

- Kelawakaju frenata (Simon, 1901) – China
- Kelawakaju intexta Maddison & Ruiz, 2022 – Malaysia (Borneo)
- Kelawakaju leucomelas Maddison & Ng, 2022 – Malaysia (Peninsula), Singapore
- Kelawakaju mulu Maddison & Ruiz, 2022 – Malaysia (Borneo)
- Kelawakaju nezha Yu & Zhang, 2025 – China
- Kelawakaju orientalis Suguro, 2024 – Japan (Ryukyu Islands)
- Kelawakaju pomo Yu, Li & Zhang, 2025 – China
- Kelawakaju sahyadri Vishnudas, Maddison, & Sudhikumar, 2022 – India
- Kelawakaju singapura Maddison & Ng, 2022 – Singapore
