= Ocrisiona cinerea =

Conservation status
- Data Deficient (NZ TCS)

Scientific classification
- Kingdom: Animalia
- Phylum: Arthropoda
- Subphylum: Chelicerata
- Class: Arachnida
- Order: Araneae
- Infraorder: Araneomorphae
- Family: Salticidae
- Genus: Ocrisiona
- Species: O. cinerea

Binomial name
- Ocrisiona cinerea (L. Koch, 1879)

Synonyms
- Marptusa cinerea

Species of spider

Ocrisiona cinerea is a species of jumping spider that is endemic to New Zealand.

== Taxonomy ==
This species was described as Marptusa cinerea by Ludwig Carl Christian Koch in 1879. It was most recently revised in 1917.

== Distribution ==
This species is only known from New Zealand.

== Conservation status ==
Under the New Zealand Threat Classification System, this species is listed as "Data Deficient" with the qualifiers of "Data Poor: Size" and "Data Poor: Trend".
