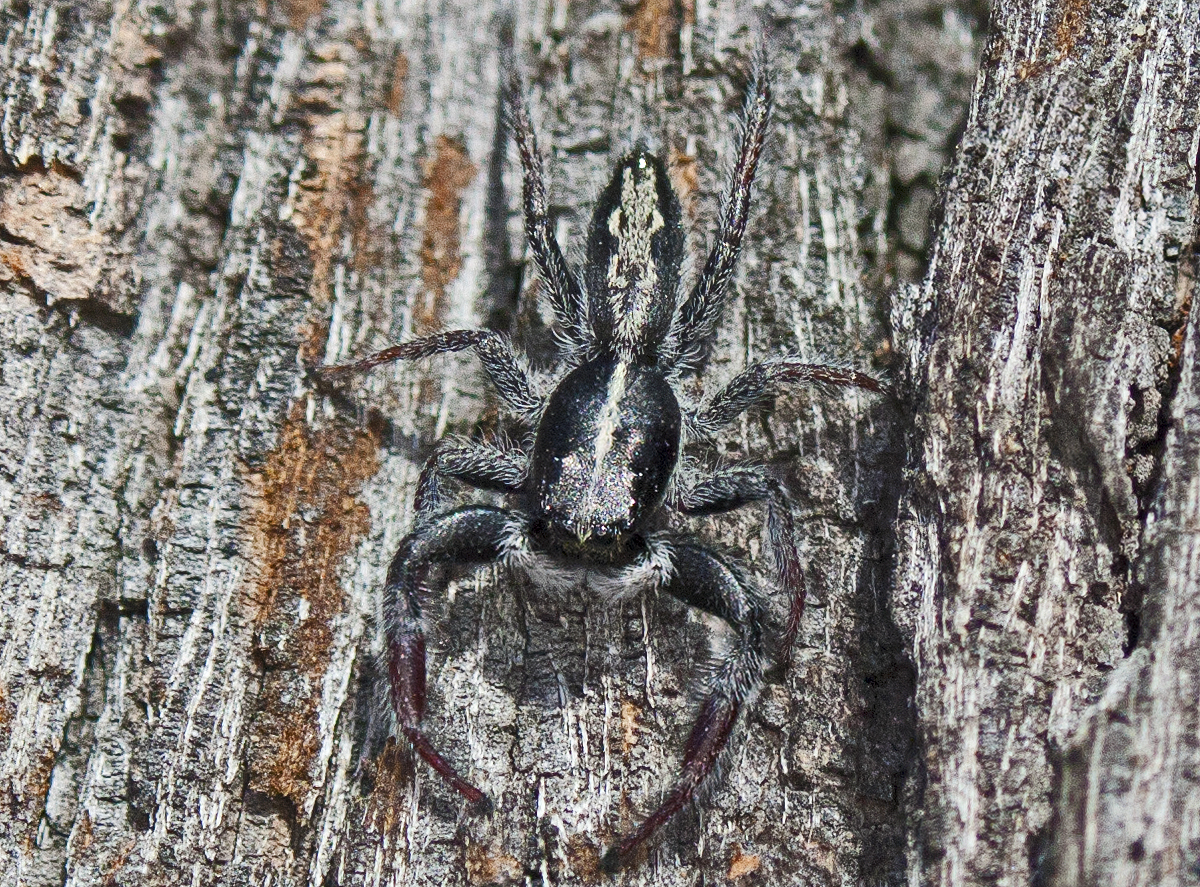

Scientific classification
- Kingdom: Animalia
- Phylum: Arthropoda
- Subphylum: Chelicerata
- Class: Arachnida
- Order: Araneae
- Infraorder: Araneomorphae
- Family: Salticidae
- Genus: Ocrisiona
- Species: O. leucocomis

Binomial name
- Ocrisiona leucocomis (L. Koch, 1879)

Synonyms
- Marptusa leucocomis

= Ocrisiona leucocomis =

Species of spider

Ocrisiona leucocomis is a species of jumping spider that is endemic to Australia and also known from New Zealand.

== Taxonomy ==
This species was described as Marptusa leucocomis by Ludwig Carl Christian Koch in 1879. It was most recently revised in 1990.

== Description ==
The cephalothorax is blackish with a dorsal white stripe. The legs are blackish. The abdomen is blackish with a light stripe dorsally and two to three light spots.

== Distribution ==
This species is widespread throughout Australia. It has also recorded from New Zealand.
