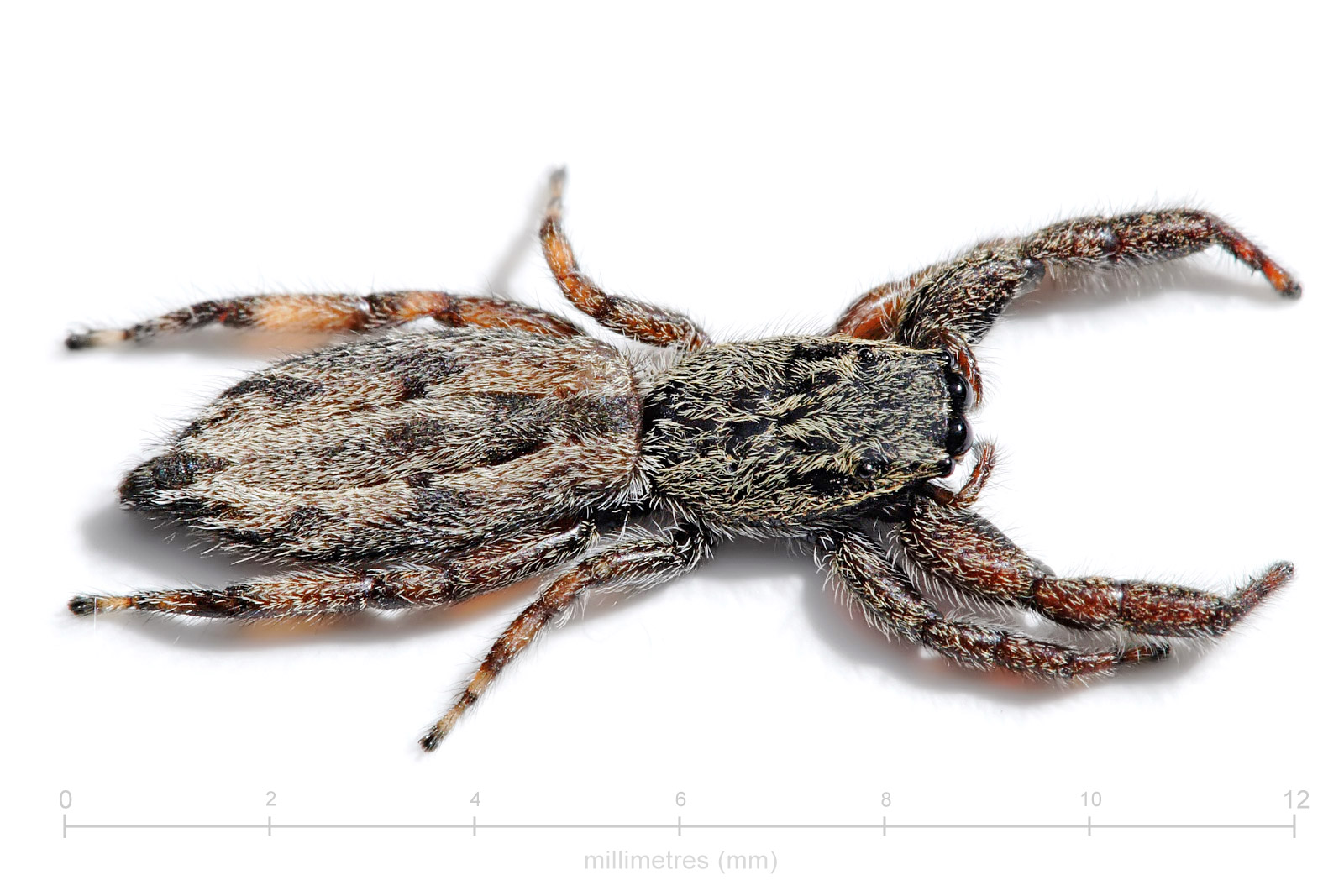
- Holoplatys semiplanata

Scientific classification
- Kingdom: Animalia
- Phylum: Arthropoda
- Subphylum: Chelicerata
- Class: Arachnida
- Order: Araneae
- Infraorder: Araneomorphae
- Family: Salticidae
- Subfamily: Salticinae
- Genus: Holoplatys; Simon, 1885

Type species
- Marptusa planissima L. Koch, 1879

Species
- See text.

= Holoplatys =

Genus of spiders

Holoplatys is a genus of the spider family Salticidae (jumping spiders).

== Description ==
Holoplatys have a long, flat, oval cephalothorax, which is truncated anteriorly, and a long, flat, oval abdomen. They are often found under the bark of trees, especially eucalyptus. They have a resemblance to Marpissa.

== Species ==
- Holoplatys apressus (Powell, 1873) – New Zealand
- Holoplatys bicolor Simon, 1901 – Queensland, Western Australia
- Holoplatys bicoloroides Zabka, 1991 – Western Australia
- Holoplatys borali Zabka, 1991 – Western Australia
- Holoplatys braemarensis Zabka, 1991 – Queensland
- Holoplatys bramptonensis Zabka, 1991 – Queensland
- Holoplatys canberra Zabka, 1991 – Australian Capital Territory
- Holoplatys carolinensis Berry, Beatty & Prószynski, 1996 – Caroline Islands
- Holoplatys chudalupensis Zabka, 1991 – Western Australia
- Holoplatys colemani Zabka, 1991 – Queensland, New South Wales
- Holoplatys complanata (L. Koch, 1879) – Queensland, Northern Territory, New Guinea
- Holoplatys complanatiformis Zabka, 1991 – Queensland, New South Wales
- Holoplatys daviesae Zabka, 1991 – Queensland, New South Wales
- Holoplatys dejongi Zabka, 1991 – Western Australia
- Holoplatys desertina Zabka, 1991 – Western Australia, South Australia
- Holoplatys digitatus Zhang et al., 2017 – South China and Thailand
- Holoplatys embolica Zabka, 1991 – Queensland
- Holoplatys fusca (Karsch, 1878) – Western Australia to Queensland
- Holoplatys grassalis Zabka, 1991 – Western Australia
- Holoplatys invenusta (L. Koch, 1879) – Queensland, New South Wales, Victoria
- Holoplatys jardinensis Zabka, 1991 – Queensland, New Guinea
- Holoplatys julimarina Zabka, 1991 – Western Australia
- Holoplatys kalgoorlie Zabka, 1991 – Western Australia
- Holoplatys kempensis Zabka, 1991 – Northern Territory
- Holoplatys lhotskyi Zabka, 1991 – Queensland, Tasmania
- Holoplatys mascordi Zabka, 1991 – New South Wales, South Australia
- Holoplatys meda Zabka, 1991 – Western Australia
- Holoplatys minuta Zabka, 1991 – Queensland
- Holoplatys oakensis Zabka, 1991 – Queensland
- Holoplatys panthera Zabka, 1991 – South Australia
- Holoplatys pedder Zabka, 1991 – Tasmania
- Holoplatys pemberton Zabka, 1991 – Western Australia
- Holoplatys planissima (L. Koch, 1879) – Western Australia to Queensland
  - Holoplatys planissima occidentalis Thorell, 1890 – Sumatra
- Holoplatys queenslandica Zabka, 1991 – Queensland, New Guinea
- Holoplatys rainbowi Zabka, 1991 – Queensland
- Holoplatys semiplanata Zabka, 1991 – Eastern Australia, New Caledonia
- Holoplatys strzeleckii Zabka, 1991 – South Australia, Tasmania
- Holoplatys tasmanensis Zabka, 1991 – Tasmania
- Holoplatys windjanensis Zabka, 1991 – Western Australia
