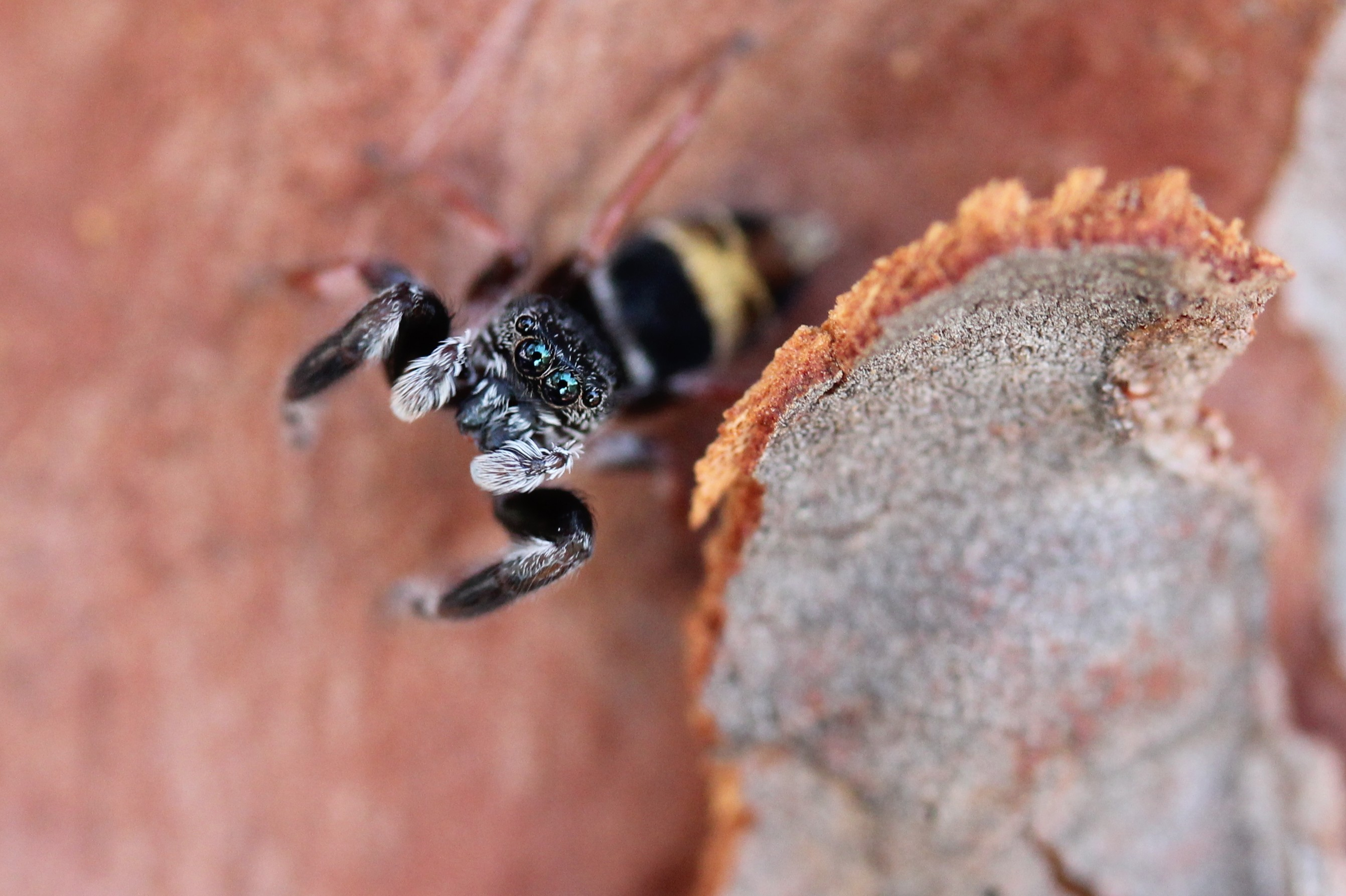
- Jovial jumper on Sydney red gum bark at Elvina Bay, Australia

Scientific classification
- Kingdom: Animalia
- Phylum: Arthropoda
- Subphylum: Chelicerata
- Class: Arachnida
- Order: Araneae
- Infraorder: Araneomorphae
- Family: Salticidae
- Genus: Apricia
- Species: A. jovialis

Binomial name
- Apricia jovialis (L.Koch 1879)

= Apricia jovialis =

Species of spider

Apricia jovialis (syn.: Ocrisiona jovialis), known as the jovial jumper is a small species of jumping spider found in Australia. This dark spider with yellow bands is often seen sheltering on tree bark.
