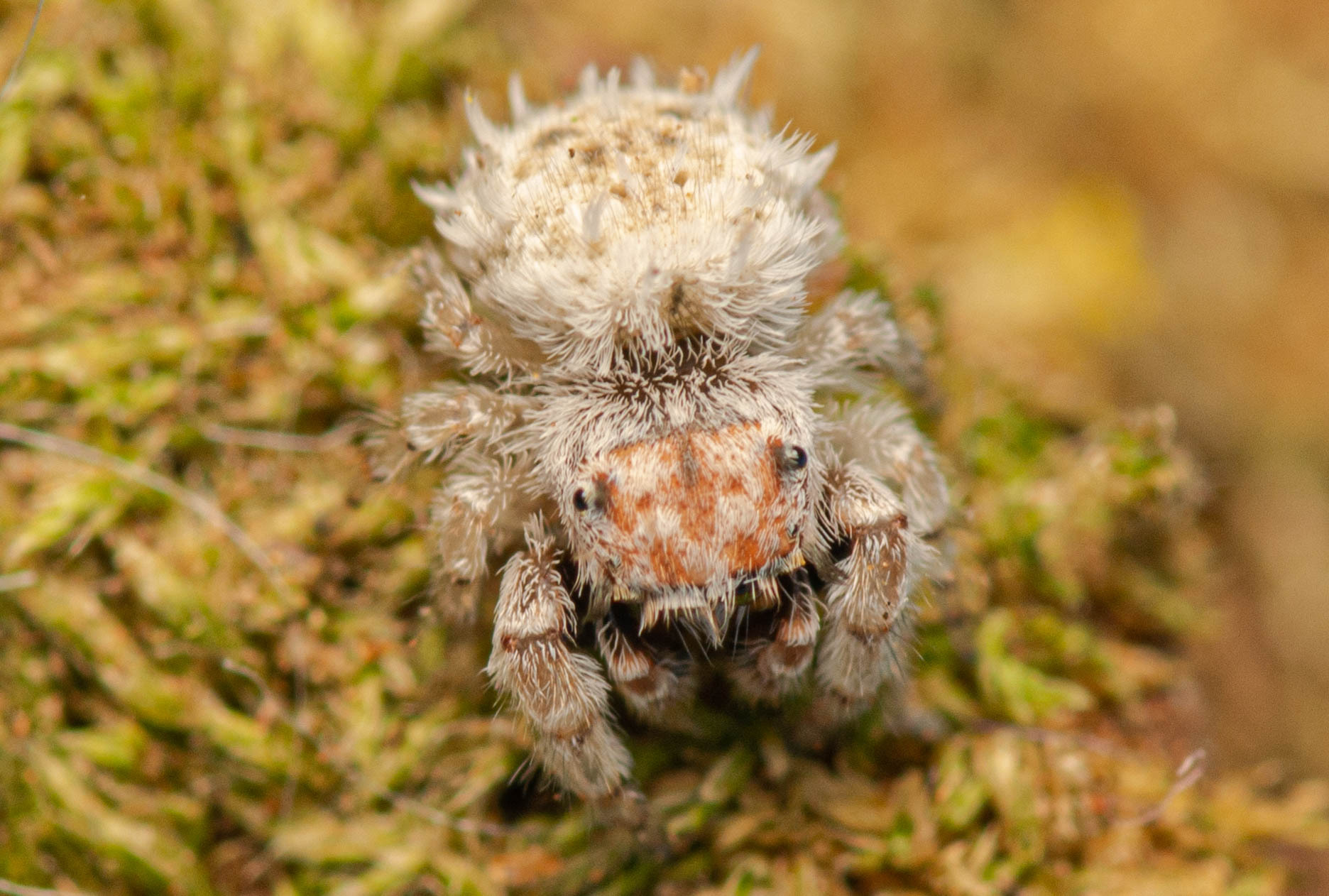

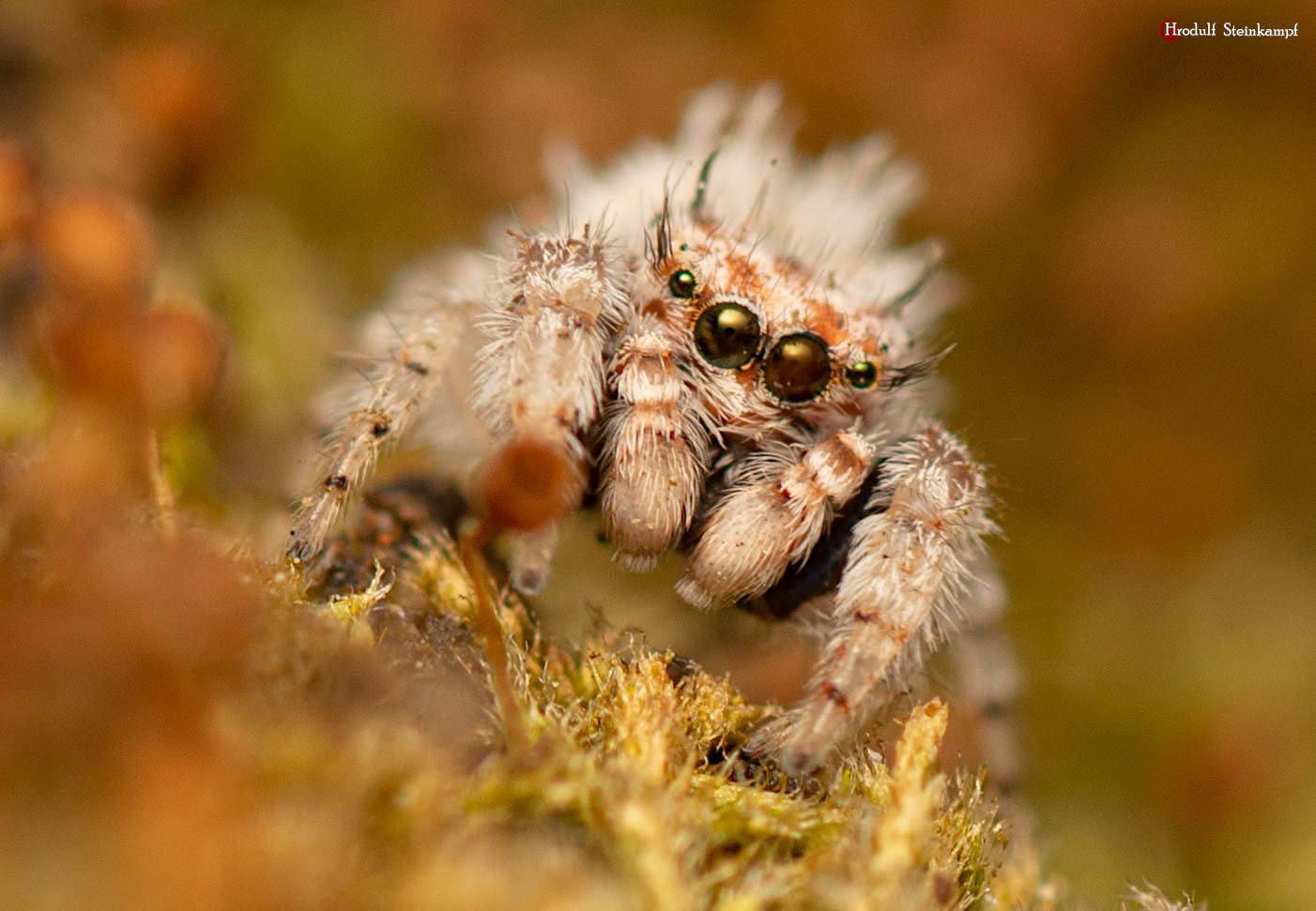

Scientific classification
- Kingdom: Animalia
- Phylum: Arthropoda
- Subphylum: Chelicerata
- Class: Arachnida
- Order: Araneae
- Infraorder: Araneomorphae
- Family: Salticidae
- Genus: Oviballus; Azarkina & Haddad, 2020
- Species: O. vidae

Binomial name
- Oviballus vidae Azarkina & Haddad, 2020

= Oviballus =

Sheepy Jumping Spider

Genus of jumping spiders

Oviballus is a monotypic genus of southern African jumping spiders containing the single species, Oviballus vidae. It was first described by G. N. Azarkina and C. R. Haddad in 2020, and it has only been found in South Africa.

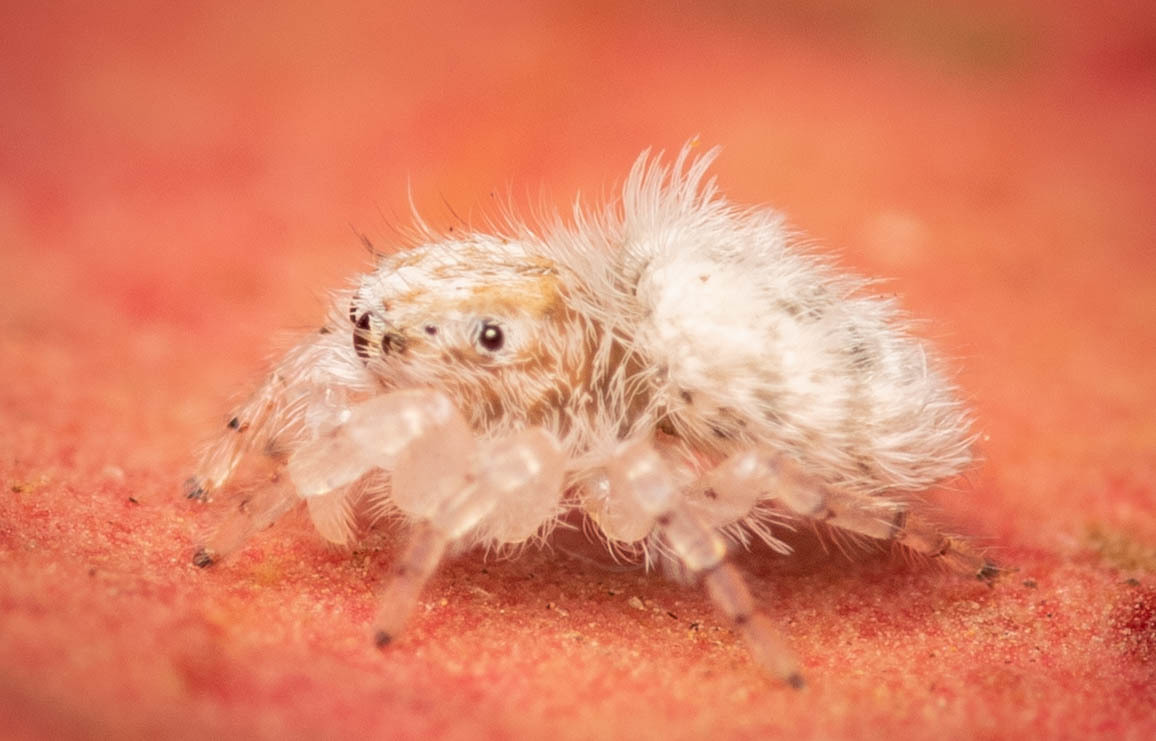

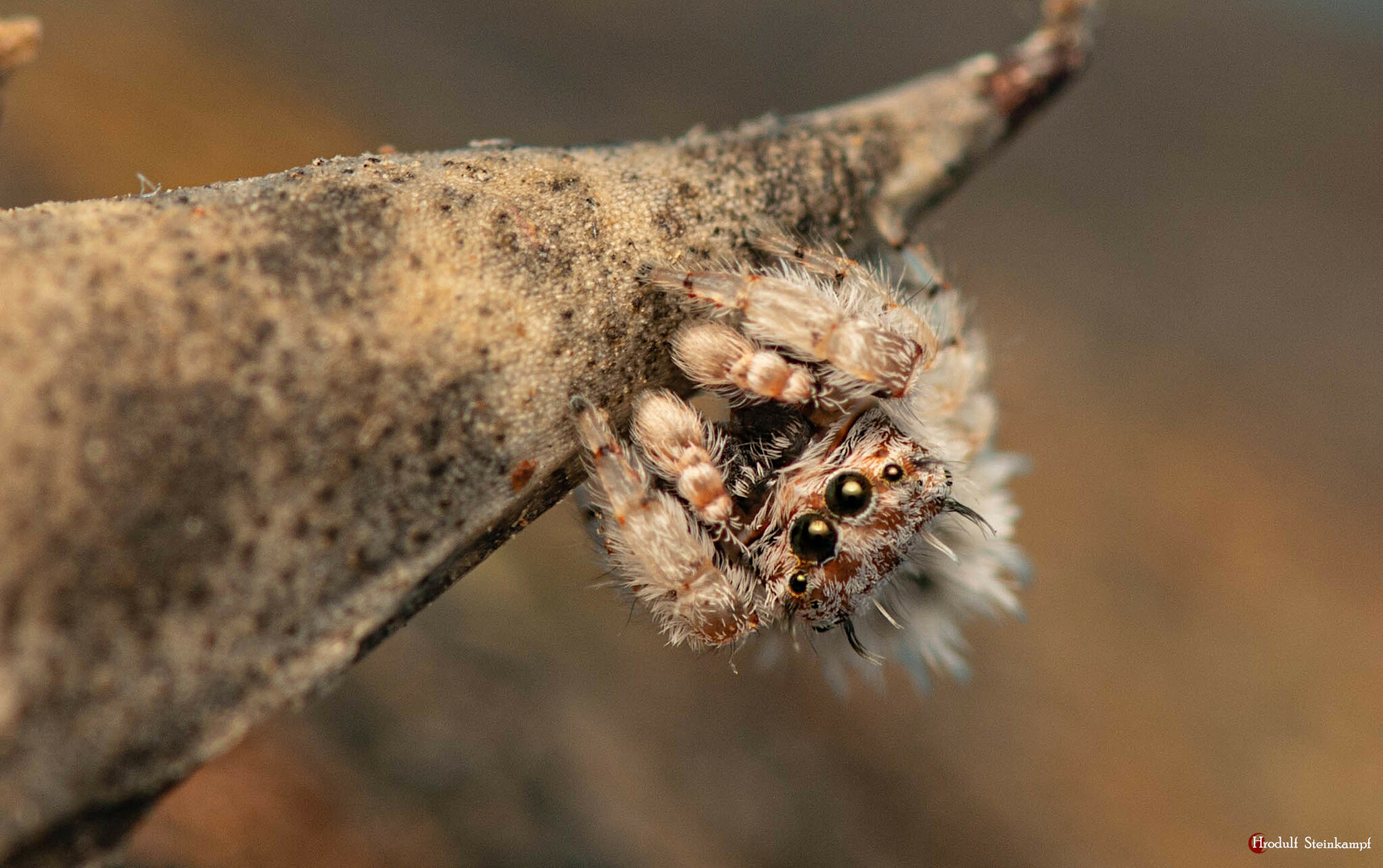

== See also ==
- List of Salticidae genera
