= Ballagascar =

Scientific classification
- Kingdom: Animalia
- Phylum: Arthropoda
- Subphylum: Chelicerata
- Class: Arachnida
- Order: Araneae
- Infraorder: Araneomorphae
- Family: Salticidae
- Genus: Ballagascar; Azarkina & Haddad, 2020
- Species: B. insularis

Binomial name
- Ballagascar insularis (G. W. Peckham & E. G. Peckham, 1885)

Genus of jumping spiders

Ballagascar is a monotypic genus of east African jumping spiders containing the single species, Ballagascar insularis. The genus was first described by G. N. Azarkina and C. R. Haddad in 2020, and it has only been found in Madagascar. The type species, Ballagascar insularis, was originally described under the name "Homalattus insularis".

== See also ==
- Homalattus
- Colaxes
- List of Salticidae genera
