= Wandawe =

Scientific classification
- Kingdom: Animalia
- Phylum: Arthropoda
- Subphylum: Chelicerata
- Class: Arachnida
- Order: Araneae
- Infraorder: Araneomorphae
- Family: Salticidae
- Genus: Wandawe; Azarkina & Haddad, 2020

Type species
- Colaxes benjamini (Wesołowska & Haddad, 2013)

Species
- Wandawe australis Azarkina & Haddad, 2020; Wandawe benjamini (Wesołowska & Haddad, 2013); Wandawe tigrina Azarkina & Haddad, 2020

Genus of jumping spiders

Wandawe is a genus of sub-Saharan African jumping spiders first described by Galina N. Azarkina and Charles R. Haddad in 2020, including one species moved from Colaxes and two newly described species. The name pays tribute to Polish zoologist Wanda Wesołowska, a major contributor jumping spider research.

== Species ==
As of October 2025, this genus includes three species:

- Wandawe australis Azarkina & Haddad, 2020 – South Africa
- Wandawe benjamini (Wesołowska & Haddad, 2013) – South Africa (type species)
- Wandawe tigrina Azarkina & Haddad, 2020 – Kenya, Uganda

== See also ==
- Colaxes
- List of Salticidae genera
