= Colaxes nitidiventris =

Scientific classification
- Kingdom: Animalia
- Phylum: Arthropoda
- Subphylum: Chelicerata
- Class: Arachnida
- Order: Araneae
- Infraorder: Araneomorphae
- Family: Salticidae
- Genus: Colaxes
- Species: C. nitidiventris

Binomial name
- Colaxes nitidiventris Simon 1900

Species of spider

Colaxes nitidiventris is a jumping spider species that lives in India. It was discovered by Eugène Simon in 1900 and is the type species for the genus Colaxes.
