= Wandawe australis =

Scientific classification
- Kingdom: Animalia
- Phylum: Arthropoda
- Subphylum: Chelicerata
- Class: Arachnida
- Order: Araneae
- Infraorder: Araneomorphae
- Family: Salticidae
- Genus: Wandawe
- Species: W. australis

Binomial name
- Wandawe australis Azarkina & Haddad, 2020

Species of spider

Wandawe australis is a species of jumping spider in the genus Wandawe that lives in South Africa.
