= Colaxes wanlessi =

Scientific classification
- Kingdom: Animalia
- Phylum: Arthropoda
- Subphylum: Chelicerata
- Class: Arachnida
- Order: Araneae
- Infraorder: Araneomorphae
- Family: Salticidae
- Genus: Colaxes
- Species: C. wanlessi

Binomial name
- Colaxes wanlessi Benjamin, 2004

Species of spider

Colaxes wanlessi is a species of spider of the genus Colaxes. It is endemic to Sri Lanka.
