= Colaxes horton =

Scientific classification
- Kingdom: Animalia
- Phylum: Arthropoda
- Subphylum: Chelicerata
- Class: Arachnida
- Order: Araneae
- Infraorder: Araneomorphae
- Family: Salticidae
- Genus: Colaxes
- Species: C. horton

Binomial name
- Colaxes horton Benjamin, 2004

Species of spider

Colaxes horton is a species of spider of the genus Colaxes. It is endemic to Sri Lanka. The species was first found from Horton Plains, hence its specific name.
