= Colaxes =

Scientific classification
- Kingdom: Animalia
- Phylum: Arthropoda
- Subphylum: Chelicerata
- Class: Arachnida
- Order: Araneae
- Infraorder: Araneomorphae
- Family: Salticidae
- Subfamily: Salticinae
- Genus: Colaxes; Simon, 1900

Type species
- C. nitidiventris Simon, 1900

Species
- 4, see text

Genus of spiders

Colaxes is a genus of jumping spiders that was first described by Eugène Louis Simon in 1900.

== Species ==
As of June 2019 it contains four species, found only in India, Sri Lanka, and South Africa:

- Colaxes benjamini Wesolowska & Haddad, 2013 – South Africa
- Colaxes horton Benjamin, 2004 – Sri Lanka
- Colaxes nitidiventris Simon, 1900 (type) – India
- Colaxes wanlessi Benjamin, 2004 – Sri Lanka
