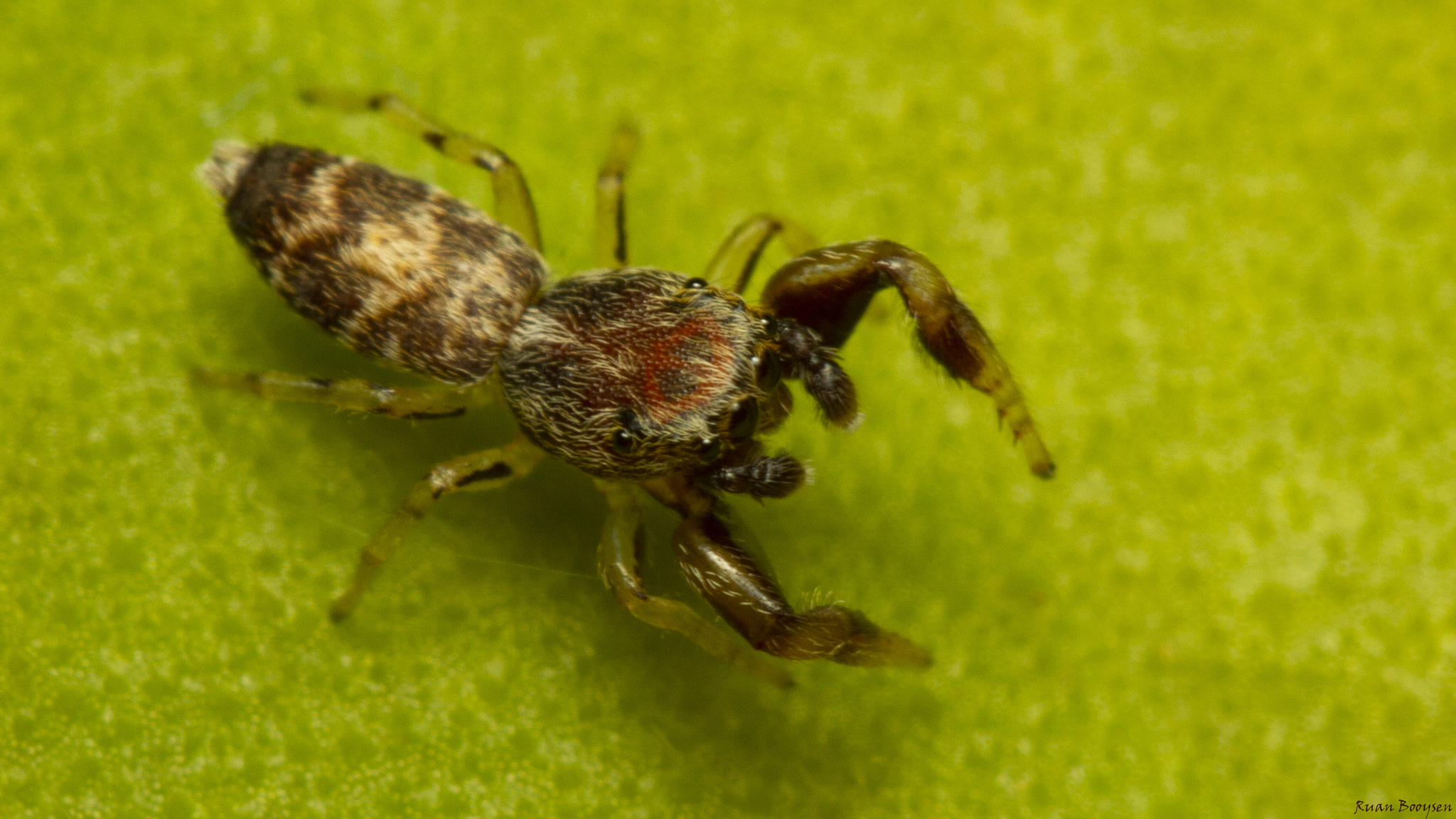

Scientific classification
- Kingdom: Animalia
- Phylum: Arthropoda
- Subphylum: Chelicerata
- Class: Arachnida
- Order: Araneae
- Infraorder: Araneomorphae
- Family: Salticidae
- Genus: Wandawe
- Species: W. benjamini

Binomial name
- Wandawe benjamini (Wesołowska & Haddad, 2013)

= Wandawe benjamini =

Species of spider

Wandawe benjamini is a jumping spider species in the genus Wandawe that was first identified in 2013. It lives in South Africa.
