= Emathis weyersi =

Scientific classification
- Kingdom: Animalia
- Phylum: Arthropoda
- Subphylum: Chelicerata
- Class: Arachnida
- Order: Araneae
- Infraorder: Araneomorphae
- Family: Salticidae
- Genus: Emathis
- Species: E. weyersi

Binomial name
- Emathis weyersi Simon, 1899

Species of spider

Emathis weyersi is a species of jumping spider that occurs from Sumatra to the Philippines.

== Description ==
The orange carapace of the female is fairly high with a flat head part. The whitish-yellow abdomen is oval and longish, with grey sides and some grey spots in the middle, the whitish-yellow legs are slender and spiny, with orange and drown hairs. The first pair of legs is more robust. The eye field is yellow, with the median frontal eyes surrounded orange and the others black.
