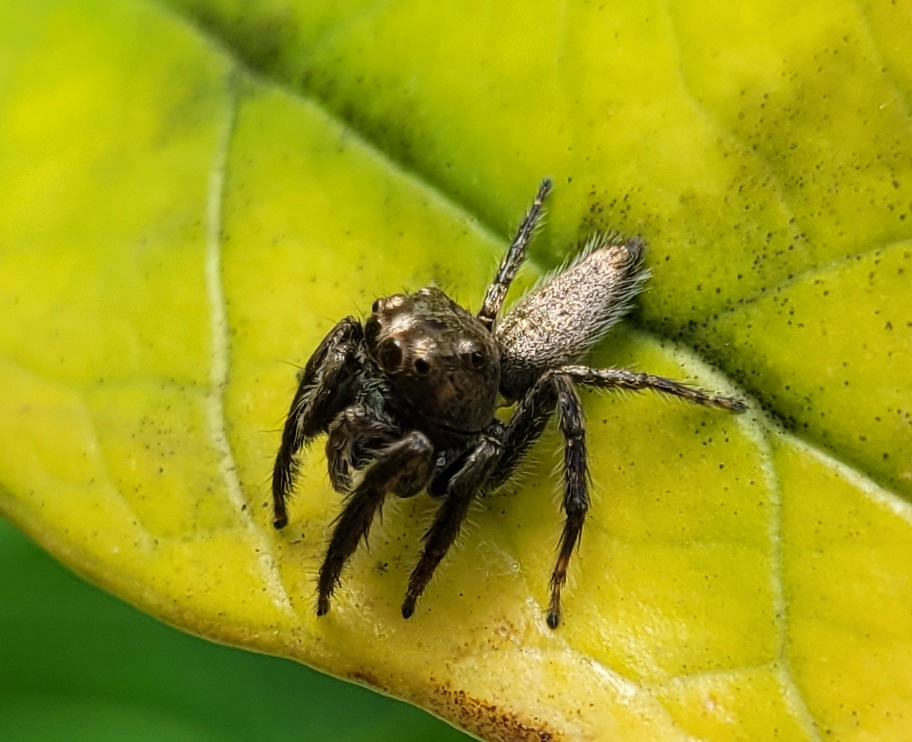
- Lepidemathis sericea (male) from Bukidnon, Philippines

Scientific classification
- Kingdom: Animalia
- Phylum: Arthropoda
- Subphylum: Chelicerata
- Class: Arachnida
- Order: Araneae
- Infraorder: Araneomorphae
- Family: Salticidae
- Subfamily: Salticinae
- Genus: Lepidemathis; Simon, 1903

Type species
- Emathis sericea Simon, 1899

Species
- See text.

= Lepidemathis =

Genus of spiders

Lepidemathis is a spider genus of the jumping spider family, Salticidae. The described species are endemic to the Philippines.

Species of Lepidemathis look like larger versions of the related genus Emathis. Lepidemathis is about 10 mm (3/8 in) long in females, and up to 13 mm (1/2 in) in males.

== Name ==
The genus name is a combination of Ancient Greek lepis "scale" and the related salticid genus Emathis.

== Species ==
As of October 2021, the World Spider Catalog lists the following species in the genus:

- Lepidemathis cavinti Barrion-Dupo & Barrion, 2020 – Philippines (Luzon)
- Lepidemathis dogmai Barrion-Dupo & Barrion, 2020 – Philippines (Luzon)
- Lepidemathis haemorrhoidalis (Simon, 1899) – Philippines
- Lepidemathis lipa Barrion-Dupo & Barrion, 2020 – Philippines (Luzon)
- Lepidemathis luisae Freudenschuss & Seiter, 2016 – Philippines
- Lepidemathis sericea (Simon, 1899) – Philippines
- Lepidemathis unicolor (Karsch, 1880) – Philippines
