= Emathis =

Scientific classification
- Kingdom: Animalia
- Phylum: Arthropoda
- Subphylum: Chelicerata
- Class: Arachnida
- Order: Araneae
- Infraorder: Araneomorphae
- Family: Salticidae
- Subfamily: Salticinae
- Genus: Emathis; Simon, 1899

Type species
- Emathis weyersi Simon, 1899

Species
- See text.

Genus of spiders

Emathis is a genus of the spider family Salticidae (jumping spiders) with ten described species. Half of the species occurs from Sumatra to the Philippines, the other five occur in the West Indies. It is not certain that these two groups should reside within the same genus. This genus is very similar to the closely related Lepidemathis, which are larger.

== Species ==
- Emathis astorgasensis Barrion & Litsinger, 1995 – Philippines
- Emathis coprea (Thorell, 1890) – Sumatra
- Emathis luteopunctata Petrunkevitch, 1930 – Puerto Rico
- Emathis makilingensis Barrion & Litsinger, 1995 – Philippines
- Emathis minuta Petrunkevitch, 1930 – Puerto Rico
- Emathis portoricensis Petrunkevitch, 1930 – Puerto Rico
- Emathis scabra (Thorell, 1890) – Sumatra
- Emathis tetuani Petrunkevitch, 1930 – Puerto Rico
- Emathis unispina Franganillo, 1930 – Cuba
- Emathis weyersi Simon, 1899 – Sumatra to Philippines
