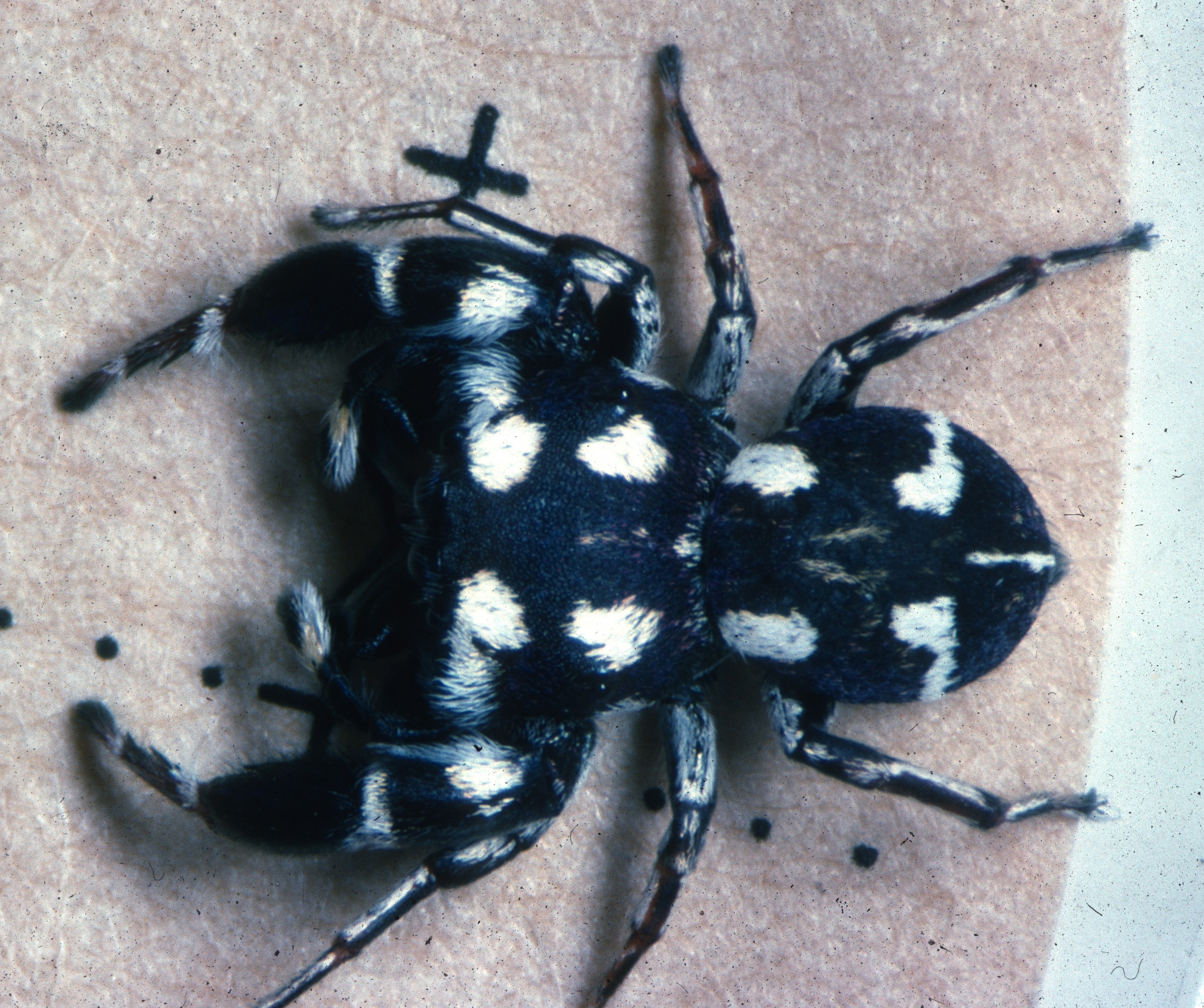
- Male Heratemita alboplagiata in the Philippines

Scientific classification
- Kingdom: Animalia
- Phylum: Arthropoda
- Subphylum: Chelicerata
- Class: Arachnida
- Order: Araneae
- Infraorder: Araneomorphae
- Family: Salticidae
- Subfamily: Salticinae
- Genus: Heratemita; Strand, 1932

Type species
- Heratemis chrysozona Simon, 1899

Species
- See text.

= Heratemita =

Genus of spiders

Heratemita is a genus of the spider family Salticidae (jumping spiders).

== Description ==
Females are about 8 mm (0.31 in) long, males 5 to 7 mm (0.20 to 0.28 in). The black carapace is wider than long, very rugose and covered with sparse violet squamose hairs. There are four large white patches near the posterior eyes. The abdomen is elongate and also sparsely covered with violet hairs, with three white longitudinal stripes. The legs are slender and black with yellow-gold marks, except for the very robust frontal pair, which are black with yellow tarsi and metatarsi. The large male chelicerae run parallel and then suddenly diverge at right angles.

== Species ==
As of May 2017, the World Spider Catalog lists the following species in the genus:

- Heratemita alboplagiata (Simon, 1899) – Philippines
- Heratemita chrysozona (Simon, 1899) – Sumatra
- Heratemita tenenbaumi Prószyński & Deeleman-Reinhold, 2012 – Sumatra
