= Sigytes paradisiacus =

Scientific classification
- Kingdom: Animalia
- Phylum: Arthropoda
- Subphylum: Chelicerata
- Class: Arachnida
- Order: Araneae
- Infraorder: Araneomorphae
- Family: Salticidae
- Genus: Sigytes
- Species: S. paradisiacus

Binomial name
- Sigytes paradisiacus Simon, 1902

Species of spider

Sigytes paradisiacus is a species of spider of the genus Sigytes. It is endemic to Sri Lanka.
