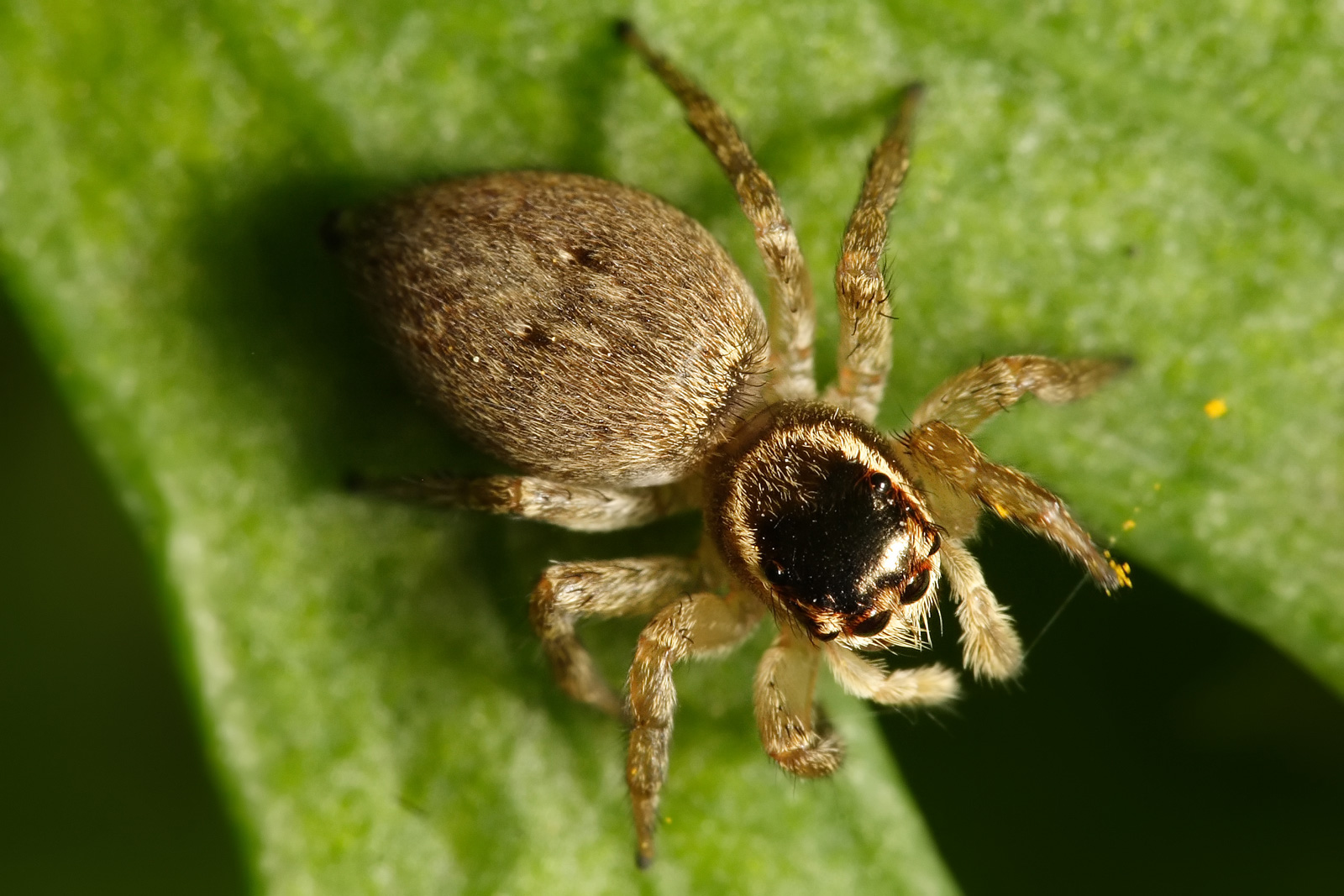
- Sigytes sp.

Scientific classification
- Kingdom: Animalia
- Phylum: Arthropoda
- Subphylum: Chelicerata
- Class: Arachnida
- Order: Araneae
- Infraorder: Araneomorphae
- Family: Salticidae
- Subfamily: Salticinae
- Genus: Sigytes; Simon, 1902

Type species
- S. paradisiacus Simon, 1902

Species
- S. albocinctus (Keyserling, 1881) – Australia (Queensland); S. diloris (Keyserling, 1881) – Australia (Queensland) to Fiji; S. paradisiacus Simon, 1902 – Sri Lanka

= Sigytes =

Genus of spiders

Sigytes is a genus of jumping spiders that was first described by Eugène Louis Simon in 1902. As of August 2019 it contains only three species, found only on Fiji, in Australia, and Sri Lanka: S. albocinctus, S. diloris, and S. paradisiacus.
