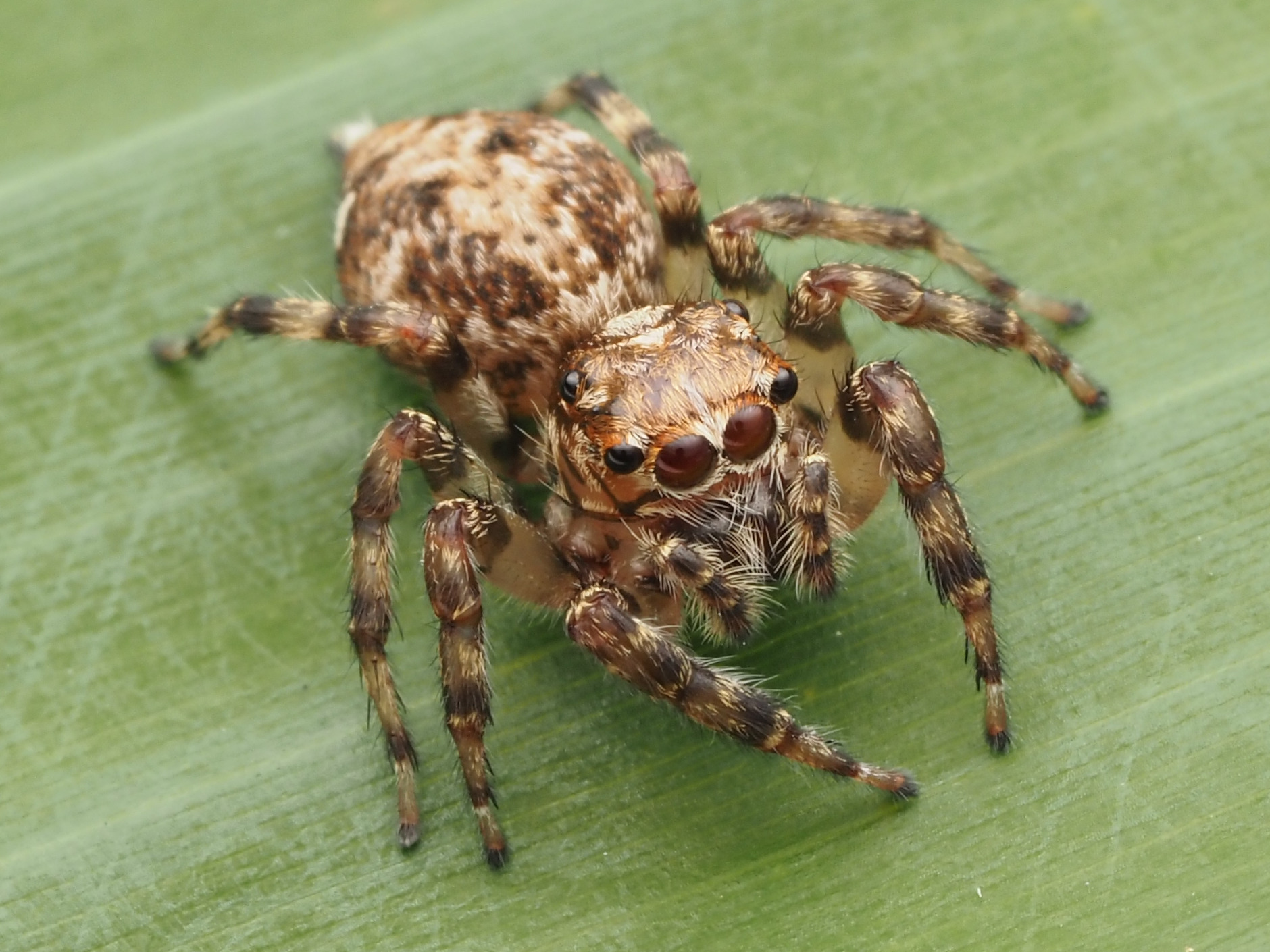
- Xanthofreya bicuspidata

Scientific classification
- Kingdom: Animalia
- Phylum: Arthropoda
- Subphylum: Chelicerata
- Class: Arachnida
- Order: Araneae
- Infraorder: Araneomorphae
- Family: Salticidae
- Subfamily: Salticinae
- Genus: Xanthofreya; Edwards, 2015

Type species
- Xanthofreya rustica

Species
- See text

= Xanthofreya =

Genus of spiders

Xanthofreya is a genus of jumping spiders. It was first described in 2015 by G. B. Edwards.

== Species ==
As of July 2023, it contains five species, found in North and South America:

- Xanthofreya albosignata (F. O. Pickard-Cambridge, 1901) – Guatemala, Panama, Colombia, Brazil
- Xanthofreya arraijanica (Chickering, 1946) – Panama, Colombia
- Xanthofreya bicuspidata (F. O. Pickard-Cambridge, 1901) – Costa Rica, Panama
- Xanthofreya chionopogon (Simon, 1902) – Venezuela
- Xanthofreya rustica (Peckham & Peckham, 1896) – Guatemala, Panama
