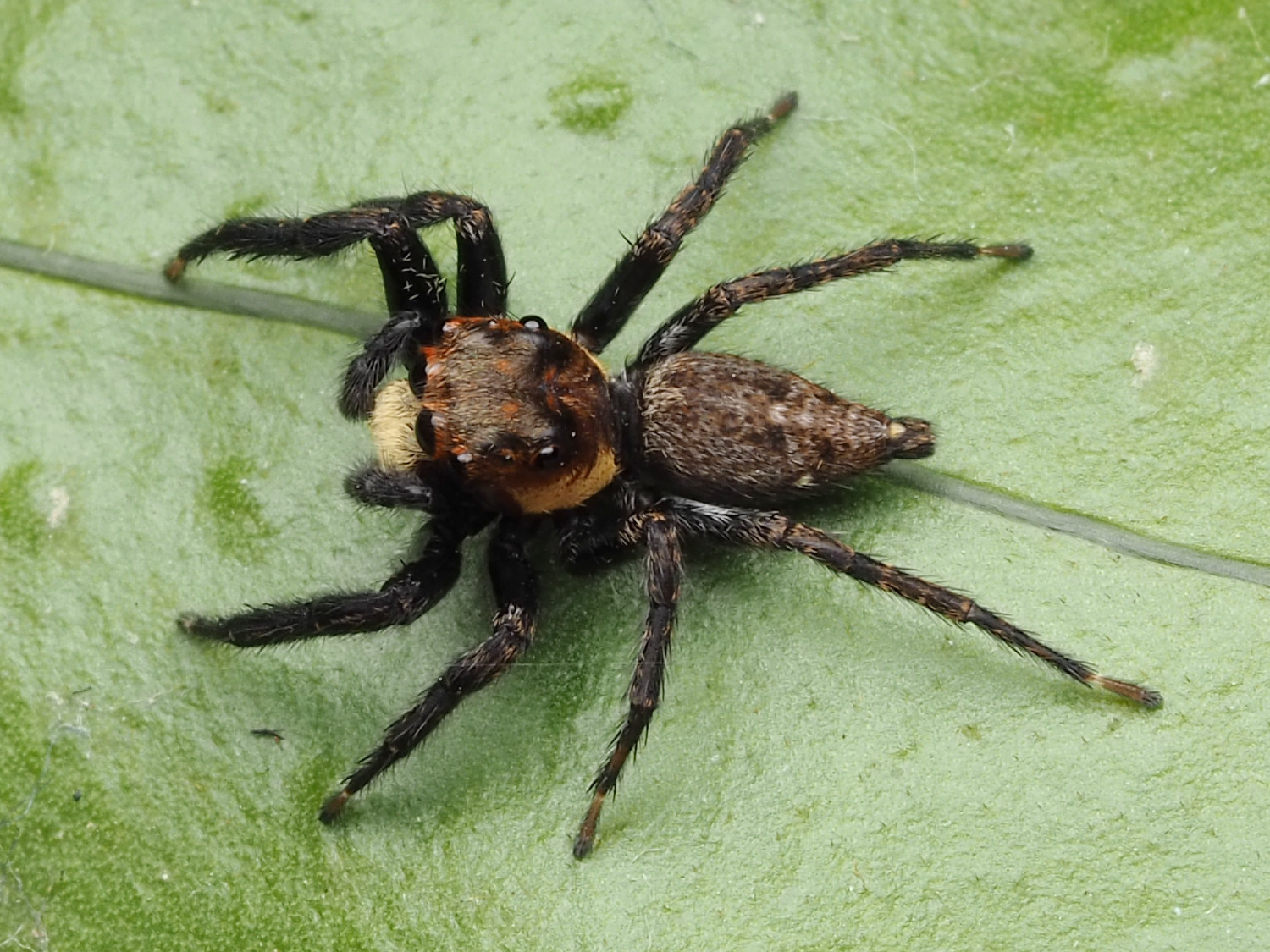
- Male Triggella infuscata in Belize

Scientific classification
- Kingdom: Animalia
- Phylum: Arthropoda
- Subphylum: Chelicerata
- Class: Arachnida
- Order: Araneae
- Infraorder: Araneomorphae
- Family: Salticidae
- Subfamily: Salticinae
- Genus: Triggella; Edwards, 2015

Type species
- Triggella infuscata

Species
- Triggella bifida (F. O. Pickard-Cambridge, 1901); Triggella infuscata (F. O. Pickard-Cambridge, 1901); Triggella minuta (F. O. Pickard-Cambridge, 1901)

= Triggella =

Genus of spiders

Triggella is a genus of jumping spiders first described in 2015. As of February 2019, it contains only three species:

- Triggella bifida (F. O. Pickard-Cambridge, 1901) – Panama
- Triggella infuscata (F. O. Pickard-Cambridge, 1901) – Guatemala to Venezuela
- Triggella minuta (F. O. Pickard-Cambridge, 1901) – Panama
