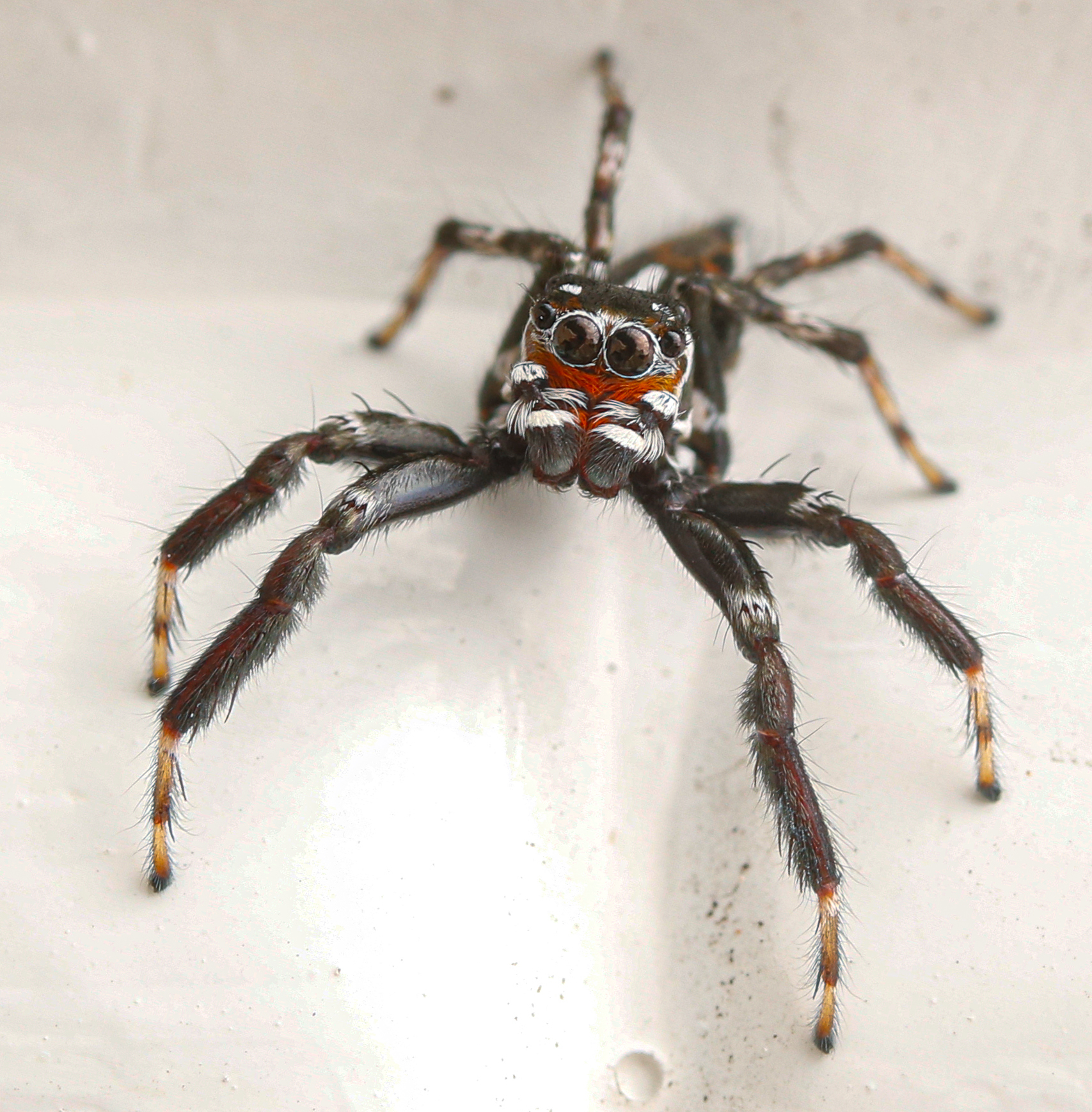
- P. daeng in Thailand

Scientific classification
- Kingdom: Animalia
- Phylum: Arthropoda
- Subphylum: Chelicerata
- Class: Arachnida
- Order: Araneae
- Infraorder: Araneomorphae
- Family: Salticidae
- Genus: Phenasurya; Marathe & Maddison, 2025
- Species: P. daeng

Binomial name
- Phenasurya daeng Marathe, Maddison & Trębicki, 2025

= Phenasurya =

Species of spider

Phenasurya is a monotypic genus of spiders in the family Salticidae containing the single species, Phenasurya daeng.

== Distribution ==
Phenasurya daeng has been recorded from Thailand.

== Etymology ==
The genus name is a combination of Ancient Greek "phen-" (appearance) and Thai "surya" (sun). The authors compare the spider's face to a red setting sun. The species name means "red" in Thai.
