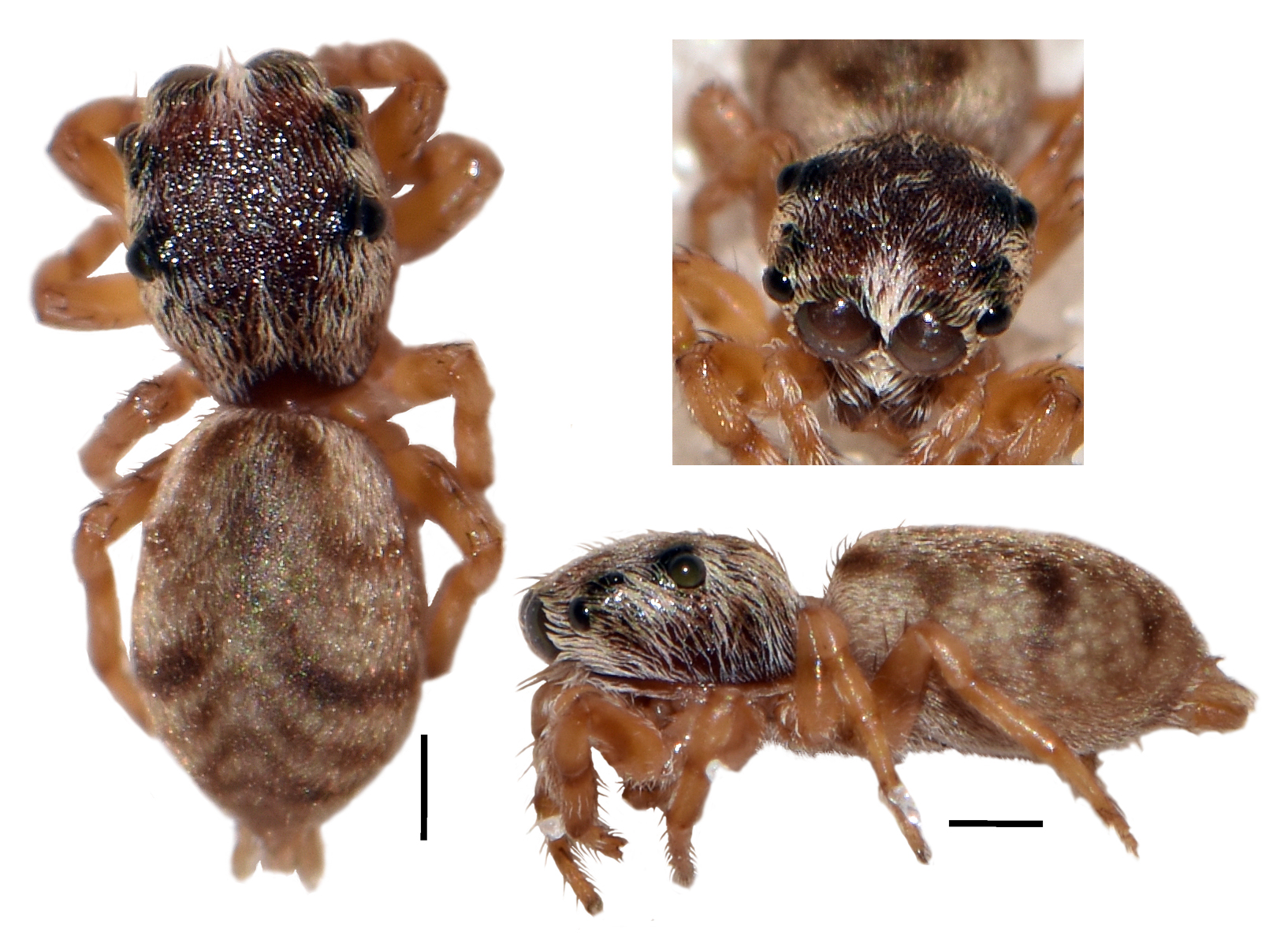
- Atelurius segmentatus

Scientific classification
- Kingdom: Animalia
- Phylum: Arthropoda
- Subphylum: Chelicerata
- Class: Arachnida
- Order: Araneae
- Infraorder: Araneomorphae
- Family: Salticidae
- Genus: Atelurius; Simon, 1901
- Species: A. segmentatus

Binomial name
- Atelurius segmentatus Simon, 1901

= Atelurius =

Genus of spiders

Atelurius is a monotypic genus of South American jumping spiders containing the single species, Atelurius segmentatus. It was first described by Eugène Louis Simon in 1901, and is only found in Brazil and Venezuela.
