= Pulcherula =

Scientific classification
- Kingdom: Animalia
- Phylum: Arthropoda
- Subphylum: Chelicerata
- Class: Arachnida
- Order: Araneae
- Infraorder: Araneomorphae
- Family: Salticidae
- Genus: Pulcherula; Wesołowska & Russell-Smith, 2022

Type species
- P. magna Wesołowska & Russell-Smith, 2022

Species
- 2, see text

Genus of spiders

Pulcherula is a genus of spiders in the family Salticidae.

== Distribution ==
Pulcherula is endemic to West Africa, with both species occurring in Guinea and Pulcherula magna additionally found in Ivory Coast.

== Etymology ==
The genus name (from Latin pulcher "beautiful") refers to the spider's coloration. The species name of P. magna refers to its large palpal size. P. scintillans is named for its shimmering abdomen (from Latin scintillans "shiny").

== Species ==
As of January 2026, this genus includes two species:

- Pulcherula magna Wesołowska & Russell-Smith, 2022 – Guinea, Ivory Coast
- Pulcherula scintillans Wesołowska & Henrard, 2025 – Guinea
