= Panysinus =

Scientific classification
- Kingdom: Animalia
- Phylum: Arthropoda
- Subphylum: Chelicerata
- Class: Arachnida
- Order: Araneae
- Infraorder: Araneomorphae
- Family: Salticidae
- Subfamily: Salticinae
- Genus: Panysinus; Simon, 1901

Type species
- P. nitens Simon, 1901

Species
- 5, see text

Genus of spiders

Panysinus is a genus of Asian jumping spiders that was first described by Eugène Louis Simon in 1901.

== Species ==
As of August 2019 it contains five species, found only in Asia:

- Panysinus grammicus Simon, 1902 – India
- Panysinus nicholsoni (O. Pickard-Cambridge, 1900) – Indonesia (Java)
- Panysinus nitens Simon, 1901 (type) – Malaysia, Indonesia (Sumatra)
- Panysinus semiargenteus (Simon, 1877) – Philippines
- Panysinus semiermis Simon, 1902 – Sri Lanka
