= Panysinus semiermis =

Scientific classification
- Kingdom: Animalia
- Phylum: Arthropoda
- Subphylum: Chelicerata
- Class: Arachnida
- Order: Araneae
- Infraorder: Araneomorphae
- Family: Salticidae
- Genus: Panysinus
- Species: P. semiermis

Binomial name
- Panysinus semiermis Simon, 1902

Species of spider

Panysinus semiermis is a species of spider of the genus Panysinus. It is endemic to Sri Lanka.
