= Gedea =

Scientific classification
- Kingdom: Animalia
- Phylum: Arthropoda
- Subphylum: Chelicerata
- Class: Arachnida
- Order: Araneae
- Infraorder: Araneomorphae
- Family: Salticidae
- Subfamily: Salticinae
- Genus: Gedea; Simon, 1902

Type species
- Gedea flavogularis Simon, 1902

Species
- See text

Diversity
- 10 species

Synonyms
- Meata Zabka, 1985

Genus of spiders

Gedea is a genus of the spider family Salticidae (jumping spiders). Its species occur in Asia from China to Java.

== Species ==
As of May 2020, the World Spider Catalog lists the following species in the genus:

- Gedea daoxianensis Song & Gong, 1992 – China
- Gedea flavogularis Simon, 1902 – Java
- Gedea fungiformis (Xiao & Yin, 1991) – China
- Gedea okinawaensis Ikeda, 2013 – Japan
- Gedea pinguis Cao & Li, 2016 – China
- Gedea sinensis Song & Chai, 1991 – China
- Gedea tibialis Zabka, 1985 – Vietnam
- Gedea typica (Zabka, 1985) – Vietnam
- Gedea unguiformis Xiao & Yin, 1991 – China
- Gedea zabkai (Prószyński & Deeleman-Reinhold, 2010) – Bali

Three species, Gedea fungiformis, Gedea typica and Gedea zabkai, were previously placed in the genus Meata, now subsumed into Gedea.
