= Maltecora janthina =

Scientific classification
- Kingdom: Animalia
- Phylum: Arthropoda
- Subphylum: Chelicerata
- Class: Arachnida
- Order: Araneae
- Infraorder: Araneomorphae
- Family: Salticidae
- Genus: Maltecora
- Species: M. janthina

Binomial name
- Maltecora janthina Simon, 1910

Species of spider

Maltecora janthina is an endemic jumping spider species of the family Salticidae that lives on São Tomé Island. It was first named in 1910 by Eugène Simon.

Its male holotype measures 5 mm.
