= Maltecora =

Scientific classification
- Kingdom: Animalia
- Phylum: Arthropoda
- Subphylum: Chelicerata
- Class: Arachnida
- Order: Araneae
- Infraorder: Araneomorphae
- Family: Salticidae
- Subfamily: Salticinae
- Genus: Maltecora; Simon, 1910

Type species
- M. janthina Simon, 1910

Species
- M. chrysochlora Simon, 1910 – São Tomé and Príncipe; M. divina Simon, 1910 – São Tomé and Príncipe; M. janthina Simon, 1910 – São Tomé and Príncipe

Genus of spiders

Maltecora is a genus of São Toméan jumping spiders that was first described by Eugène Louis Simon in 1910. As of June 2019 it contains only three species, found only in São Tomé and Príncipe: M. chrysochlora, M. divina, and M. janthina.
