= Langerra =

Scientific classification
- Kingdom: Animalia
- Phylum: Arthropoda
- Subphylum: Chelicerata
- Class: Arachnida
- Order: Araneae
- Infraorder: Araneomorphae
- Family: Salticidae
- Subfamily: Salticinae
- Genus: Langerra; Zabka, 1985

Type species
- Langerra oculina Zabka, 1985

Species
- See text.

Genus of spiders

Langerra is a spider genus of the jumping spider family, Salticidae.

While L. oculina is only known from females, only the male of L. longicymbia has been described.

The first L. oculina was beaten from bushes in forest of Vietnam. It was four millimeters long. Its carapace is orange-brown with a lighter patch towards the posterior margin. Around the front median eyes it is dark brown, the other eyes are surrounded black. The grey opisthosoma darkens posteriorly. The first two pairs of legs are dark orange with yellow tarsi, the other two pairs are lighter.

== Species ==
- Langerra longicymbia Song & Chai, 1991 – China
- Langerra oculina Zabka, 1985 – China, Vietnam
