= Salpesia =

Scientific classification
- Kingdom: Animalia
- Phylum: Arthropoda
- Subphylum: Chelicerata
- Class: Arachnida
- Order: Araneae
- Infraorder: Araneomorphae
- Family: Salticidae
- Subfamily: Salticinae
- Genus: Salpesia; Simon, 1901

Type species
- S. soricina Simon, 1901

Species
- 5, see text

Genus of spiders

Salpesia is a genus of jumping spiders that was first described by Eugène Louis Simon in 1901.

== Species ==
As of August 2019 it contains five species, four that occur in Australia and one species found on the Seychelles.

- Salpesia bicolor (Keyserling, 1883) – Australia (Queensland)
- Salpesia bimaculata (Keyserling, 1883) – Australia (New South Wales)
- Salpesia soricina Simon, 1901 (type) – Seychelles
- Salpesia squalida (Keyserling, 1883) – Australia (Queensland, New South Wales)
- Salpesia villosa (Keyserling, 1883) – Australia
