= Aruana =

Scientific classification
- Kingdom: Animalia
- Phylum: Arthropoda
- Subphylum: Chelicerata
- Class: Arachnida
- Order: Araneae
- Infraorder: Araneomorphae
- Family: Salticidae
- Subfamily: Salticinae
- Genus: Aruana; Strand, 1911

Type species
- A. silvicola Strand, 1911

Species
- A. silvicola Strand, 1911 – Indonesia (Aru Is.); A. vanstraeleni (Roewer, 1938) – New Guinea

Synonyms
- Lyssorthrus Roewer, 1938

Genus of spiders

Aruana is a genus of jumping spiders that was first described by Embrik Strand in 1911. As of June 2019 it contains only two species, found only in Papua New Guinea and on the Aru Islands: A. silvicola and A. vanstraeleni.
