= Ceglusa =

Scientific classification
- Kingdom: Animalia
- Phylum: Arthropoda
- Subphylum: Chelicerata
- Class: Arachnida
- Order: Araneae
- Infraorder: Araneomorphae
- Family: Salticidae
- Subfamily: incertae sedis
- Genus: Ceglusa; Thorell, 1895
- Species: C. polita

Binomial name
- Ceglusa polita Thorell, 1895

Genus of spiders

Ceglusa is a monotypic genus of Burmese jumping spiders containing the single species, Ceglusa polita. It was first described by Tamerlan Thorell in 1895, and is only found in Myanmar. It was described from a single 5 millimetres (0.20 in) long female, and no drawings exist. and no studies were published on it since. Its taxonomic relationships within the family are unknown.
