= Myrmele =

Scientific classification
- Kingdom: Animalia
- Phylum: Arthropoda
- Subphylum: Chelicerata
- Class: Arachnida
- Order: Araneae
- Infraorder: Araneomorphae
- Family: Salticidae
- Subfamily: Salticinae
- Genus: Myrmele; Prószyński, 2016

Type species
- Myrmele peckhami

Species
- Myrmele andringitra (Wanless, 1978); Myrmele electrica (Peckham & Peckham, 1892); Myrmele peckhami (Roewer, 1951); Myrmele rufescens (Simon, 1900)

Genus of spiders

Myrmele is a genus of spiders in the family Salticidae. It was first described in 2016 by Prószyński. As of 2017, it contains 4 species, all from Madagascar.
