= Ancepitilobus =

Scientific classification
- Kingdom: Animalia
- Phylum: Arthropoda
- Subphylum: Chelicerata
- Class: Arachnida
- Order: Araneae
- Infraorder: Araneomorphae
- Family: Salticidae
- Subfamily: incertae sedis
- Genus: Ancepitilobus
- Species: A. howensis

Binomial name
- Ancepitilobus howensis Richardson, 2016

Genus of spiders

Ancepitilobus is a genus of spiders in the family Salticidae. It was first described in 2016 by Richardson. As of 2017, it contains only one species, Ancepitilobus howensis, found on Lord Howe Island. Its taxonomic relationships within the family are unknown.
