= Leuserattus =

Scientific classification
- Kingdom: Animalia
- Phylum: Arthropoda
- Subphylum: Chelicerata
- Class: Arachnida
- Order: Araneae
- Infraorder: Araneomorphae
- Family: Salticidae
- Genus: Leuserattus
- Species: L. gunung

Binomial name
- Leuserattus gunung Prószyński & Deeleman-Reinhold, 2012

Genus of spiders

Leuserattus is a genus of spiders in the family Salticidae. It was first described in 2012 by Prószyński & Deeleman-Reinhold. As of 2017, it contains only one species, Leuserattus gunung, found in Sumatra.
