= Tanybelus =

Scientific classification
- Kingdom: Animalia
- Phylum: Arthropoda
- Subphylum: Chelicerata
- Class: Arachnida
- Order: Araneae
- Infraorder: Araneomorphae
- Family: Salticidae
- Genus: Tanybelus; Simon, 1902
- Species: T. aeneiceps

Binomial name
- Tanybelus aeneiceps Simon, 1902

Genus of spiders

Tanybelus is a monotypic genus of South American jumping spiders containing the single species, Tanybelus aeneiceps. It was first described by Eugène Louis Simon in 1902, and is found only in Venezuela and Colombia.
