= Mikrus =

Scientific classification
- Kingdom: Animalia
- Phylum: Arthropoda
- Subphylum: Chelicerata
- Class: Arachnida
- Order: Araneae
- Infraorder: Araneomorphae
- Family: Salticidae
- Genus: Mikrus; Wesolowska, 2001
- Species: M. ugandensis

Binomial name
- Mikrus ugandensis Wesolowska, 2001

Genus of spiders

Mikrus is a monotypic genus of East African jumping spiders containing the single species, Mikrus ugandensis. It was first described by Wanda Wesołowska in 2001, and is only found in Uganda and Kenya.
