= Madhyattus =

Scientific classification
- Kingdom: Animalia
- Phylum: Arthropoda
- Subphylum: Chelicerata
- Class: Arachnida
- Order: Araneae
- Infraorder: Araneomorphae
- Family: Salticidae
- Genus: Madhyattus
- Species: M. jabalpurensis

Binomial name
- Madhyattus jabalpurensis Prószyński, 1992

Genus of jumping spiders

Madhyattus is a genus of the jumping spiders found in India. It contains only one species, Madhyattus jabalpurensis.

== Name ==
The genus name is a combination of Madhya and the common salticid ending -attus.
