= Cavillator =

Scientific classification
- Kingdom: Animalia
- Phylum: Arthropoda
- Subphylum: Chelicerata
- Class: Arachnida
- Order: Araneae
- Infraorder: Araneomorphae
- Family: Salticidae
- Genus: Cavillator; Wesolowska, 2000
- Species: C. longipes

Binomial name
- Cavillator longipes Wesolowska, 2000

Genus of spiders

Cavillator is a monotypic genus of Zimbabwean jumping spiders containing the single species, Cavillator longipes. It was first described by Wanda Wesołowska in 2000, and is only found in Zimbabwe.
