= Ghumattus =

Scientific classification
- Kingdom: Animalia
- Phylum: Arthropoda
- Subphylum: Chelicerata
- Class: Arachnida
- Order: Araneae
- Infraorder: Araneomorphae
- Family: Salticidae
- Genus: Ghumattus; Prószyński, 1992
- Species: G. primus

Binomial name
- Ghumattus primus Prószyński, 1992

Genus of spiders

Ghumattus is a monotypic genus of Indian jumping spiders containing a single species, Ghumattus primus. It was first described by Jerzy Prószyński in 1992 and is only found in India.
