= Similaria =

Scientific classification
- Kingdom: Animalia
- Phylum: Arthropoda
- Subphylum: Chelicerata
- Class: Arachnida
- Order: Araneae
- Infraorder: Araneomorphae
- Family: Salticidae
- Genus: Similaria; Prószyński, 1992
- Species: S. enigmatica

Binomial name
- Similaria enigmatica Prószyński, 1992

Genus of spiders

Similaria is a monotypic genus of Indian jumping spiders containing the single species, Similaria enigmatica. It was first described by Jerzy Prószyński in 1992, and is found only in India.
