= Uxuma =

Scientific classification
- Kingdom: Animalia
- Phylum: Arthropoda
- Subphylum: Chelicerata
- Class: Arachnida
- Order: Araneae
- Infraorder: Araneomorphae
- Family: Salticidae
- Genus: Uxuma; Simon, 1902
- Species: U. impudica

Binomial name
- Uxuma impudica Simon, 1902

Genus of spiders

Uxuma is a monotypic genus of Gabonese jumping spiders containing the single species, Uxuma impudica. It was first described by Eugène Louis Simon in 1902, and is found in Gabon.
