= Jaluiticola =

Scientific classification
- Kingdom: Animalia
- Phylum: Arthropoda
- Subphylum: Chelicerata
- Class: Arachnida
- Order: Araneae
- Infraorder: Araneomorphae
- Family: Salticidae
- Genus: Jaluiticola; Roewer, 1944
- Species: J. hesslei

Binomial name
- Jaluiticola hesslei Roewer, 1944

Genus of spiders

Jaluiticola is a genus of jumping spiders endemic to the Marshall Islands. Its only species is Jaluiticola hesslei.
