= Imraz Iqbal =

Imraz Iqbal Ali is an Indo-Fijian human rights activist, journalist, and businessman. He does not normally use his last name, except for legal purposes. Together with Laisa Digitaki, he was the co-owner of a magazine, Fiji Living, based in Digitaki's home in the Lami suburb of Vugalei. Iqbal also hosted a popular Fiji Diving adventure show during his Television Career.

He contested the Nasinu Indian Communal Constituency for the Soqosoqo Duavata ni Lewenivanua Party (SDL) at the 2006 Fijian general election. He polled only 226 votes out of more than 12,000 - some 1.9 percent of the total. He later served as a spokesperson for the SDL.

Iqbal strongly condemned the Republic of Fiji Military Forces for the coup d'état of 5 December 2006. An article he published in Fiji Living resulted in Navy Commander Francis Kean summoning him to Suva's Queen Elizabeth Barracks and warning him against speaking out against the Military.

In the early hours of 25 December, Iqbal was again summoned to the barracks, along with Digitaki, feminist leader Virisila Buadromo, and a number of others. They were allegedly assaulted by soldiers before being ordered to walk home.

In September 2008 Iqbal again had a brush with the law. This time the Fiji Police force alleged him to be in possession of the missing gun of the 2000 coup. He was arrested and held for 3 days by the Fiji police force and released after numerous raids and searches found no weapons in his possession.
