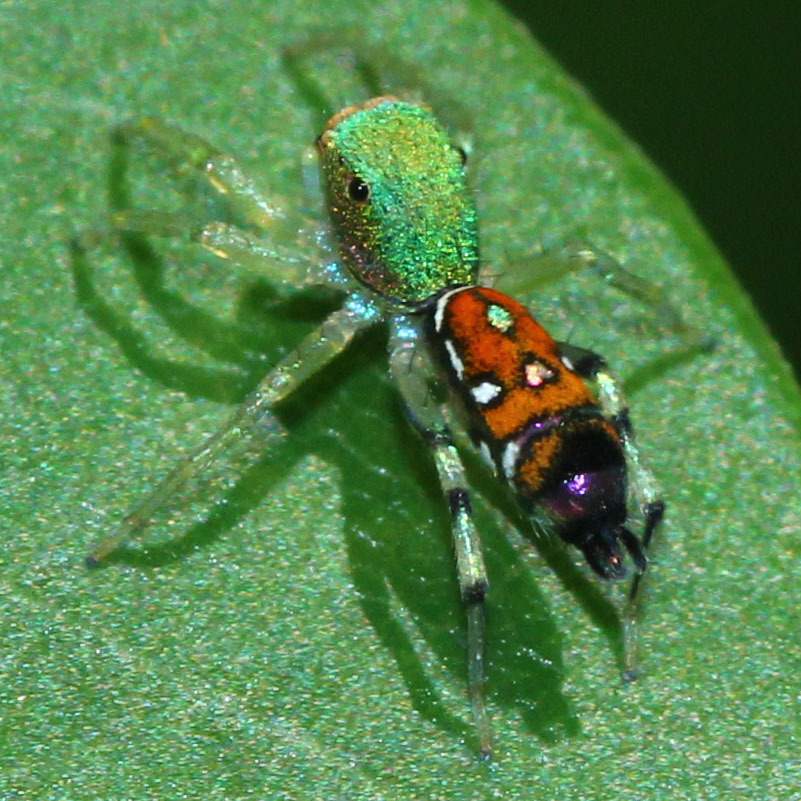
- female from Java
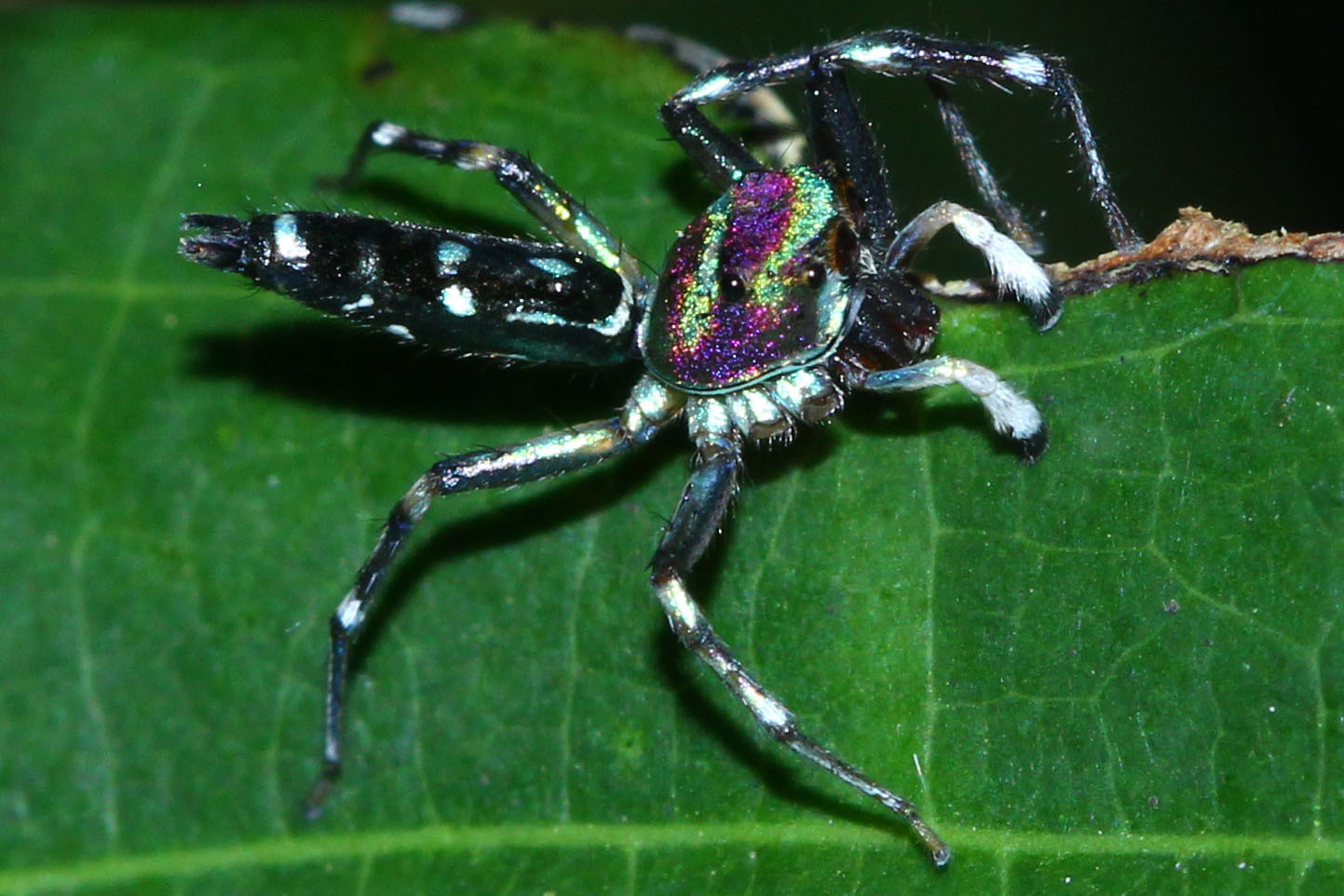
- male from Java

Scientific classification
- Kingdom: Animalia
- Phylum: Arthropoda
- Subphylum: Chelicerata
- Class: Arachnida
- Order: Araneae
- Infraorder: Araneomorphae
- Family: Salticidae
- Genus: Cosmophasis
- Species: C. valerieae

Binomial name
- Cosmophasis valerieae Prószyński & Deeleman-Reinhold, 2010

= Cosmophasis valerieae =

Species of jumping spider

Cosmophasis valerieae is a species of jumping spider in the genus Cosmophasis. It is found in Indonesia.

== Etymology ==
The species is named after Australian arachnologist Valerie Todd Davies.

== Distribution ==
C. valerieae has been recorded from Java and the Lesser Sunda Islands in Indonesia, specifically from Sumbawa Island. The species is known only from the southernmost islands of Indonesia, ranging from Java to East Nusa Tenggara.

== Description ==
Cosmophasis valerieae is a sexually dimorphic species with distinct differences between males and females.

Males resemble other well-known Cosmophasis species like C. thalassina and C. umbratica in general appearance, but are readily distinguishable by their coloration. Instead of black transverse bands on the carapace, males display brilliant violet-gold iridescent scales. The wide clypeus is jet-black, interrupted only by a few white clypeal setae at the center. The dorsal opisthosoma features a transverse band consisting of three fused circular patches of iridescent scales, rather than a long median tract. Most of the opisthosoma is covered with dense, overlapping pitch-black scales.

Females are even more distinctive in their coloration. The carapace is uniformly covered with vivid green iridescent scales ranging from yellow to blue-green, with some orange scales around the anterior eyes. The opisthosoma has a background of bright orange scales with markings resembling those of C. bitaeniata. However, instead of a transverse band across the dorsal opisthosoma, three separate white spots outlined in black are present. These spots remain separate rather than fused as in males.

Immature specimens resemble adult females in their coloration pattern.
