= Agni Deo Singh =

Fijian politician (died 2026)

The Honourable Agni Deo Singh MP
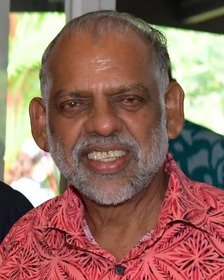
- Singh in 2023

Minister for Employment, Productivity and Industrial Relations
- In office 24 December 2022 – 12 September 2026
- Prime Minister: Sitiveni Rabuka
- Preceded by: Premila Kumar
- Succeeded by: TBD

Member of the Fijian Parliament for NFP List
- In office 14 December 2022 – 12 September 2026

Member of the Fijian Parliament for Macuata East Open
- In office 13 May 2006 – 5 December 2006
- Preceded by: Krishna Datt
- Succeeded by: Seat abolished

Personal details
- Born: Macuata, Fiji
- Died: 12 September 2026 Brisbane, Queensland, Australia
- Party: Fiji Labour Party; National Federation Party

Agni Deo Singh (died 12 September 2026) was an Indo-Fijian trade unionist, politician, and Cabinet Minister. He served as general secretary of the Fiji Teachers Union (FTU) from 1999 to 2006, and again from 2007 to 2022. After being elected to the Parliament of Fiji in the 2022 election, he was Minister for Employment, Productivity and Industrial Relations in the coalition government.

== Early life ==
Singh was born in rural Macuata in Vanua Levu, the second largest island in the Fiji Archipelago. He trained as a teacher at Corpus Christi Teachers College before completing a diploma and bachelor of arts at the University of the South Pacific. He worked as a teacher in Kadavu, Nausori, and Nasinu. In 1980, he became the secretary of the Rewa branch of the Fiji Teachers Union and in 1984, became the chairman of the branch. In 1987, he became the branch representative to attend national executive meetings and in 1992 became the assistant general secretary. In 1999, following the election of the incumbent, Pratap Chand to Parliament, he was elected general secretary of the FTU. As FTU secretary, he campaigned against the racist education policies of the Laisenia Qarase-led government.

== Political career ==
Singh was elected to Parliament in the 2006 Fijian general election on the Fiji Labour Party ticket from Macuata East Open Constituency, but continued in his role as FTU general secretary. Shortly after being elected, he was one of a group of Labour MPs who challenged party leader Mahendra Chaudhry's nominees to the Senate of Fiji, and as a result was threatened with expulsion from the party. In August 2006, just before the High Court could rule on the issue, the Labour Party dropped disciplinary charges, then immediately revived them once the threat of court action had passed. Ultimately Singh escaped expulsion, but lost his seat in parliament when the House of Representatives of Fiji was disestablished by the 2006 Fijian coup d'état.

Following the coup Singh returned to his post in the trade union, On 14 April 2007, Singh was re-elected to the post of General Secretary of the Fiji Teachers Union. where he campaigned against forced pay cuts by the military regime. In March 2007, the FTU voted for strike action in violation of state of emergency decrees, resulting in a warning from the military regime. In 2007, he supported the regime's Employment Relations Bill, but wanted it to be passed by a legally elected government. In 2008, he campaigned for teachers to be given back pay for the regime-imposed pay cuts, and against the regime's cuts in teacher numbers. In 2012, he campaigned against the regime's Public Order Amendment Decree, which restricted freedom of speech.

In April 2021, he was re-elected as FTU general secretary. In January 2022, during the COVID-19 pandemic, he called for schools to stay closed and to re-open only when physical distance was no longer necessary, and expressed concern about the number of teachers becoming infected. He also opposed teachers being told to return to school during Cyclone Cody. He was subsequently attacked by then-Attorney-General Aiyaz Sayed-Khaiyum and education minister Premila Kumar, who suggested his views were due to plans to become an election candidate.

In April 2022, he attended the National Federation Party AGM. He subsequently contested the 2022 Fijian general election as an NFP candidate, and placed third on the party list with 2,308 votes. On 24 December 2022, he was appointed Minister for Employment, Productivity and Industrial Relations in the coalition government of Sitiveni Rabuka.

== Death ==
Singh died in Brisbane on 12 September 2026.
