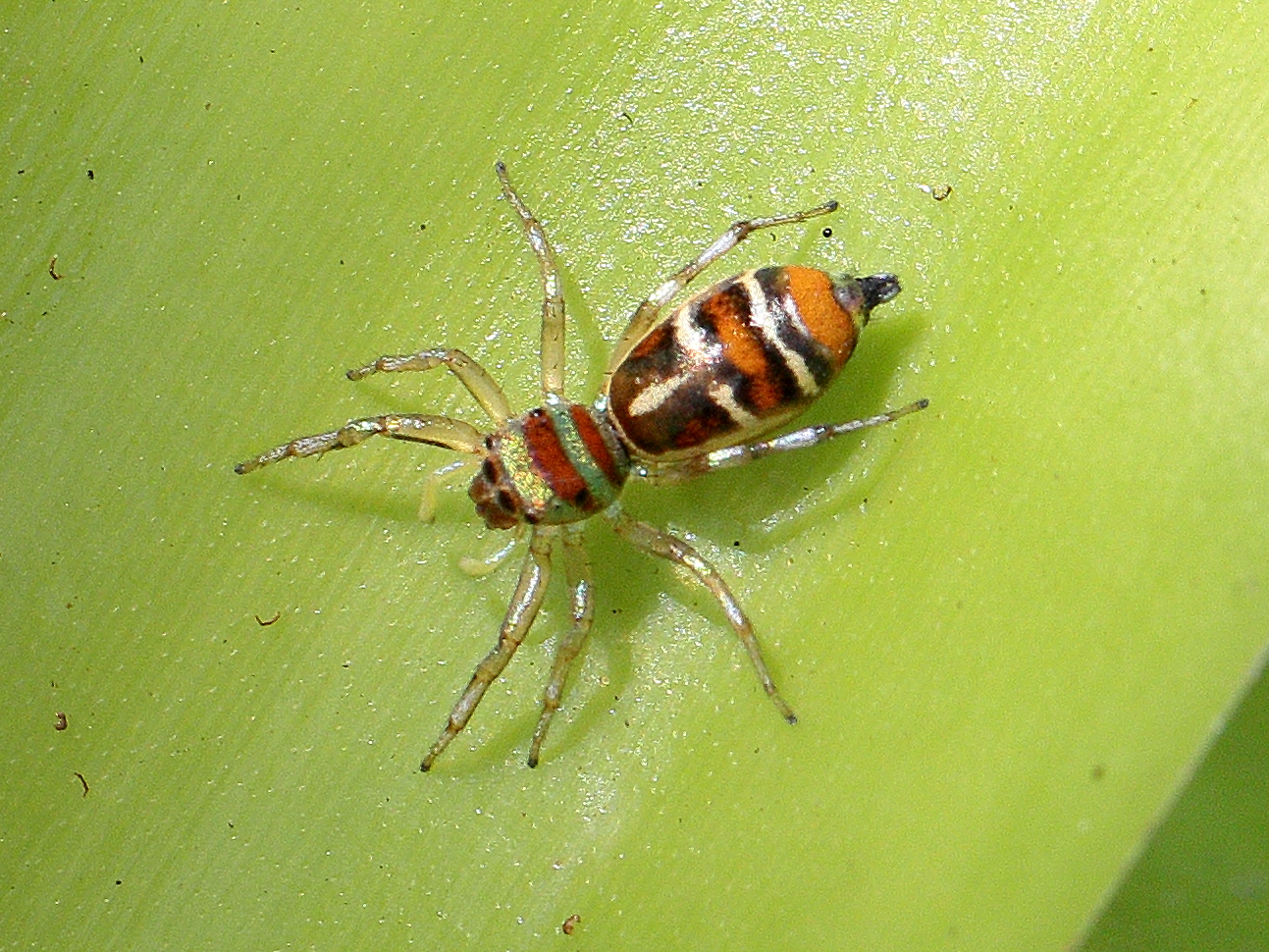
- Female
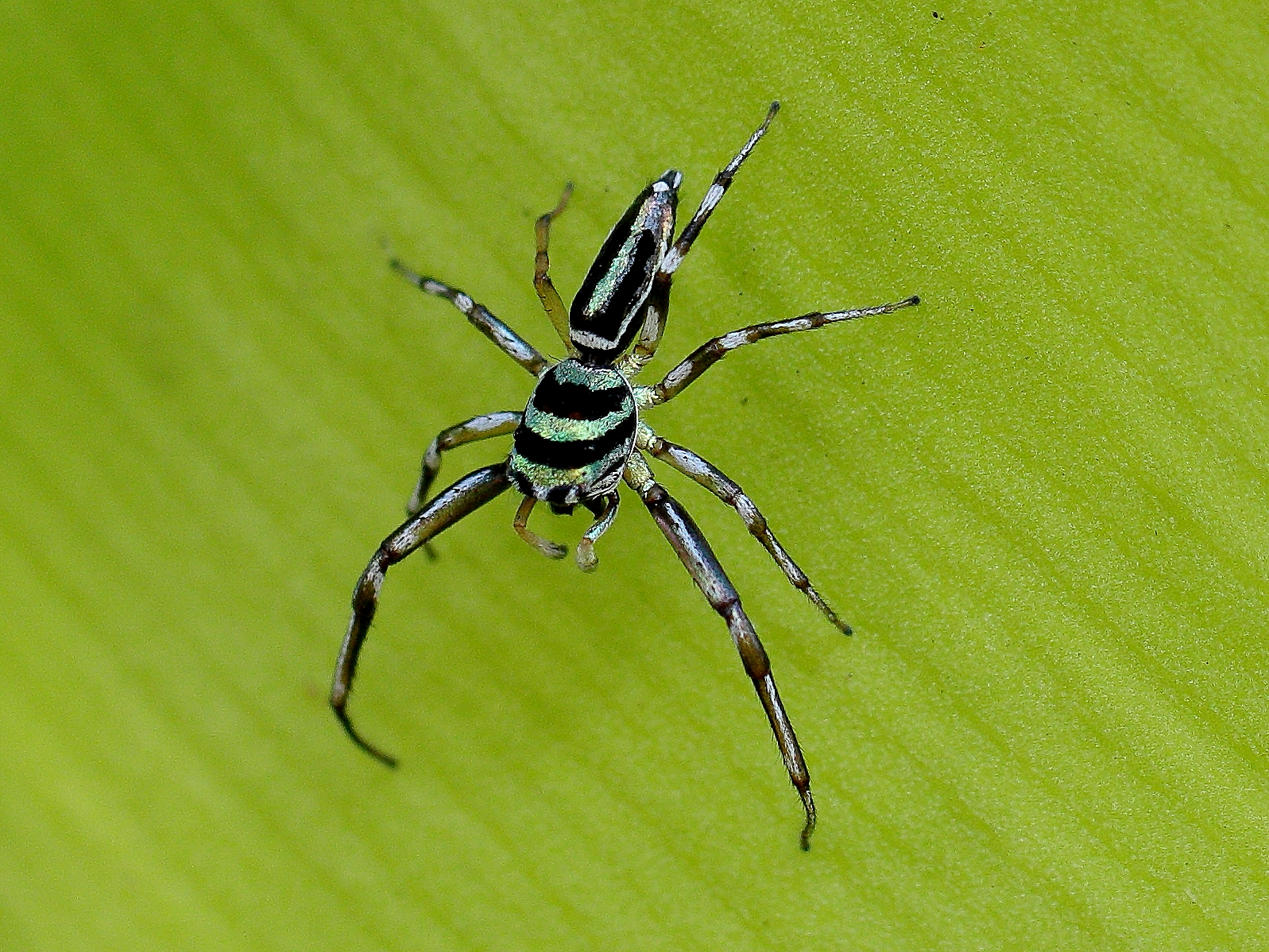
- Male

Scientific classification
- Kingdom: Animalia
- Phylum: Arthropoda
- Subphylum: Chelicerata
- Class: Arachnida
- Order: Araneae
- Infraorder: Araneomorphae
- Family: Salticidae
- Genus: Cosmophasis
- Species: C. micarioides

Binomial name
- Cosmophasis micarioides Cosmophasis micarioides (L. Koch, 1880)

Synonyms
- Amycus micarioides (L. Koch, 1880); Cosmophasis micarioides (Simon, 1901)

= Cosmophasis micarioides =

Species of spider

Cosmophasis micarioides is a species of jumping spider found in Papua New Guinea, Australia and the Solomon Islands. The common name is sparkling northern jumping spider. When in motion, the male spider bobs its abdomen up and down reflecting sunlight that causes a characteristic sparkle.

== Description ==
There are significant differences in colour and patterns between male and female Cosmophasis micarioides. The male is black with iridescent bands of blue-green, and has a longitudinal mark on the abdomen. The female is orange-brown with lighter coloured bands of green and brown that lie across the abdomen. The pattern of marks on the female is quite variable and not reliable for identification. The distinguishing feature is that stripes on the side of the head of both sexes reach down to the rim of the carapace, as opposed to the very similar Cosmophasis thalassina where black does not extend as far as the rim. The abdomen of the male is narrower than the female. The subadult male has orange in place of black on top of the carapace. The species is widespread and common in tropical Australia and south to Brisbane. Body length from head to tail is 5 mm (0.20 in) for females and 6.5 mm (0.26 in) for males.

== Gallery ==
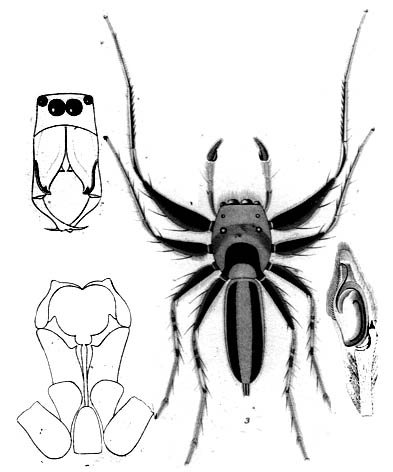
Illustration by L. Koch

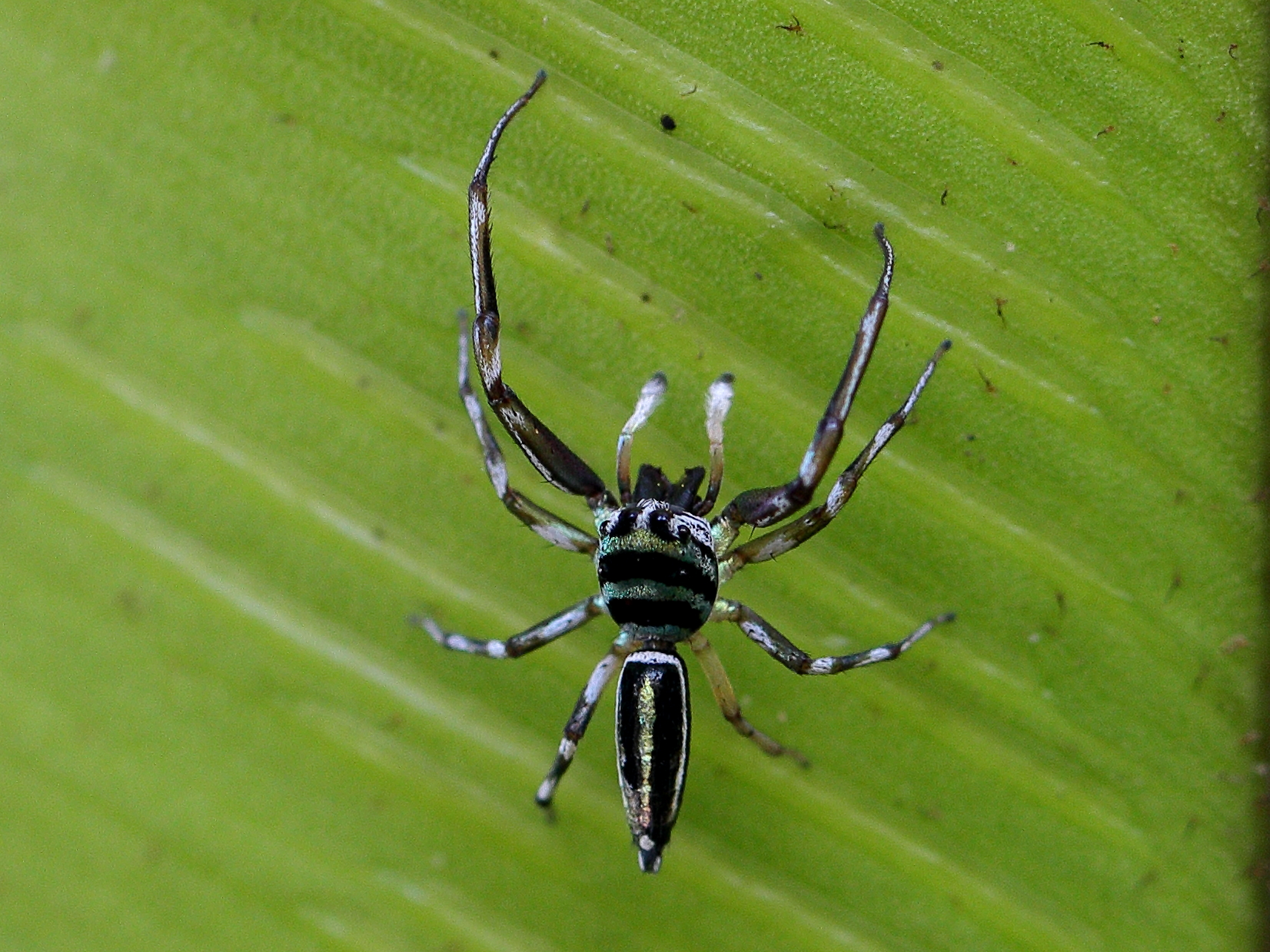
Male from above

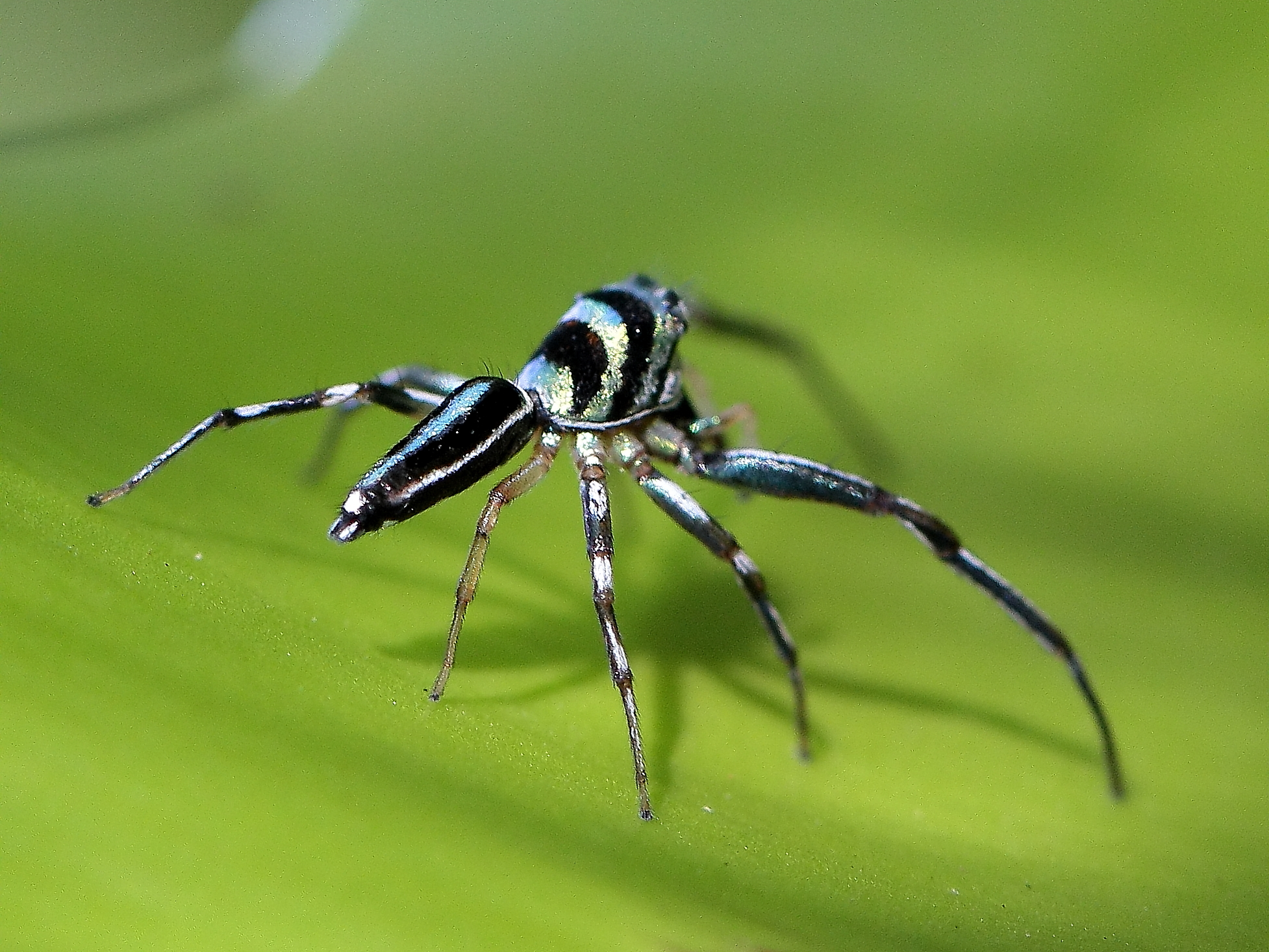
Black bands reach down to the carapace rim

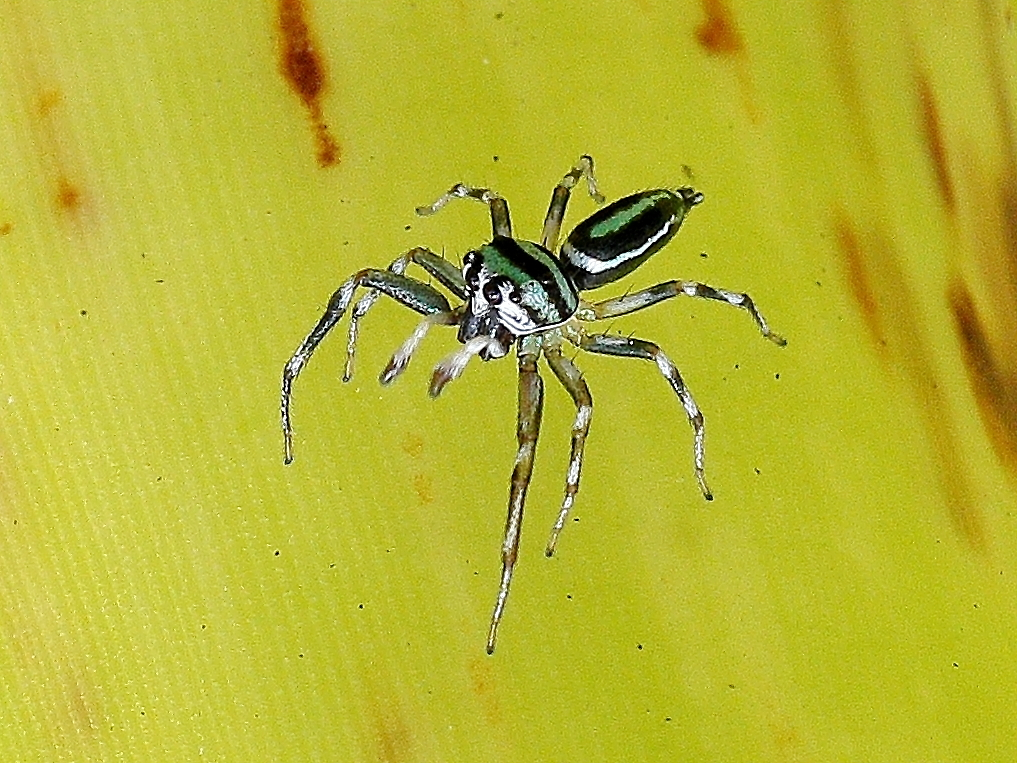
Male in Cairns

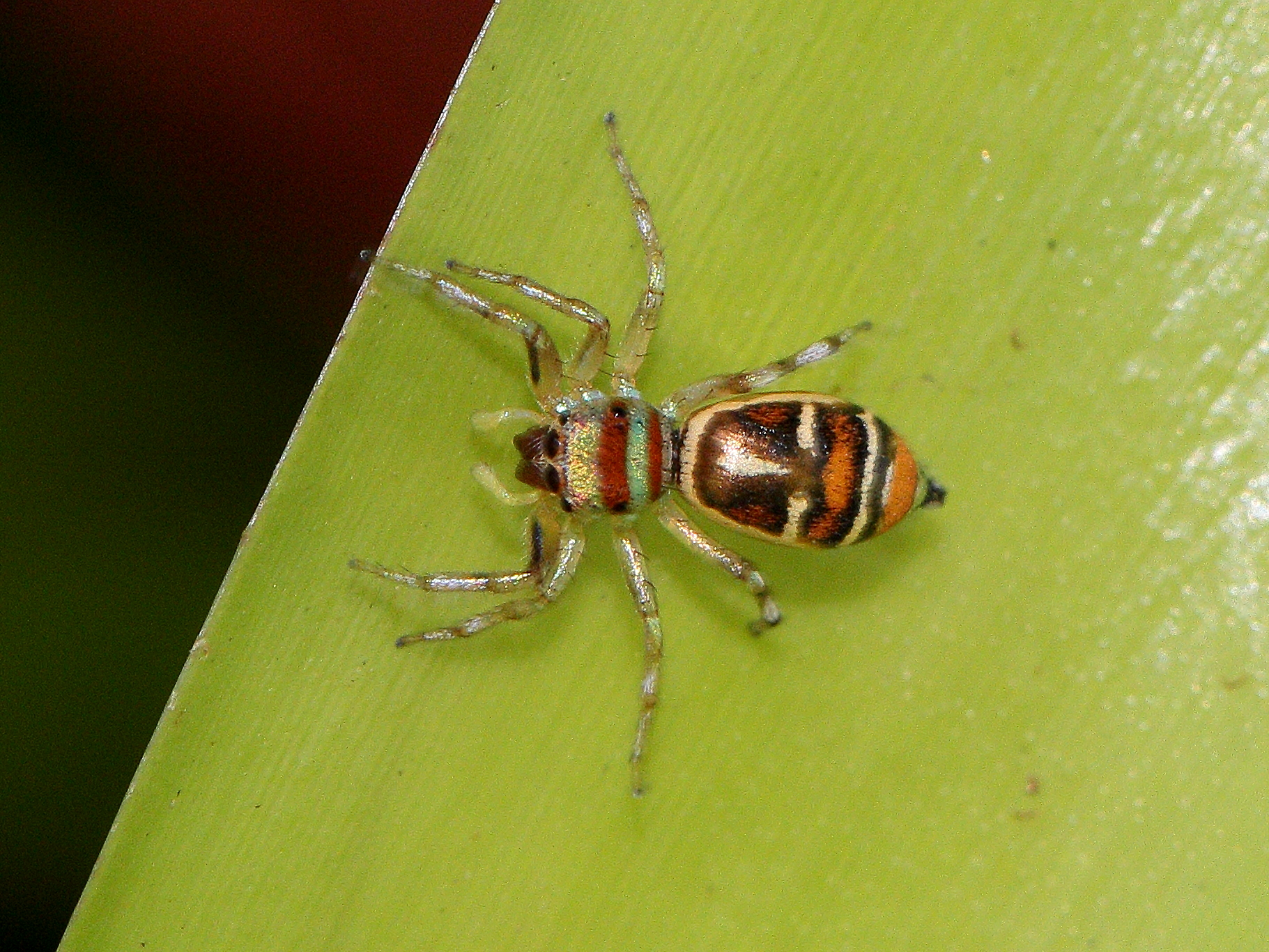
Female from above

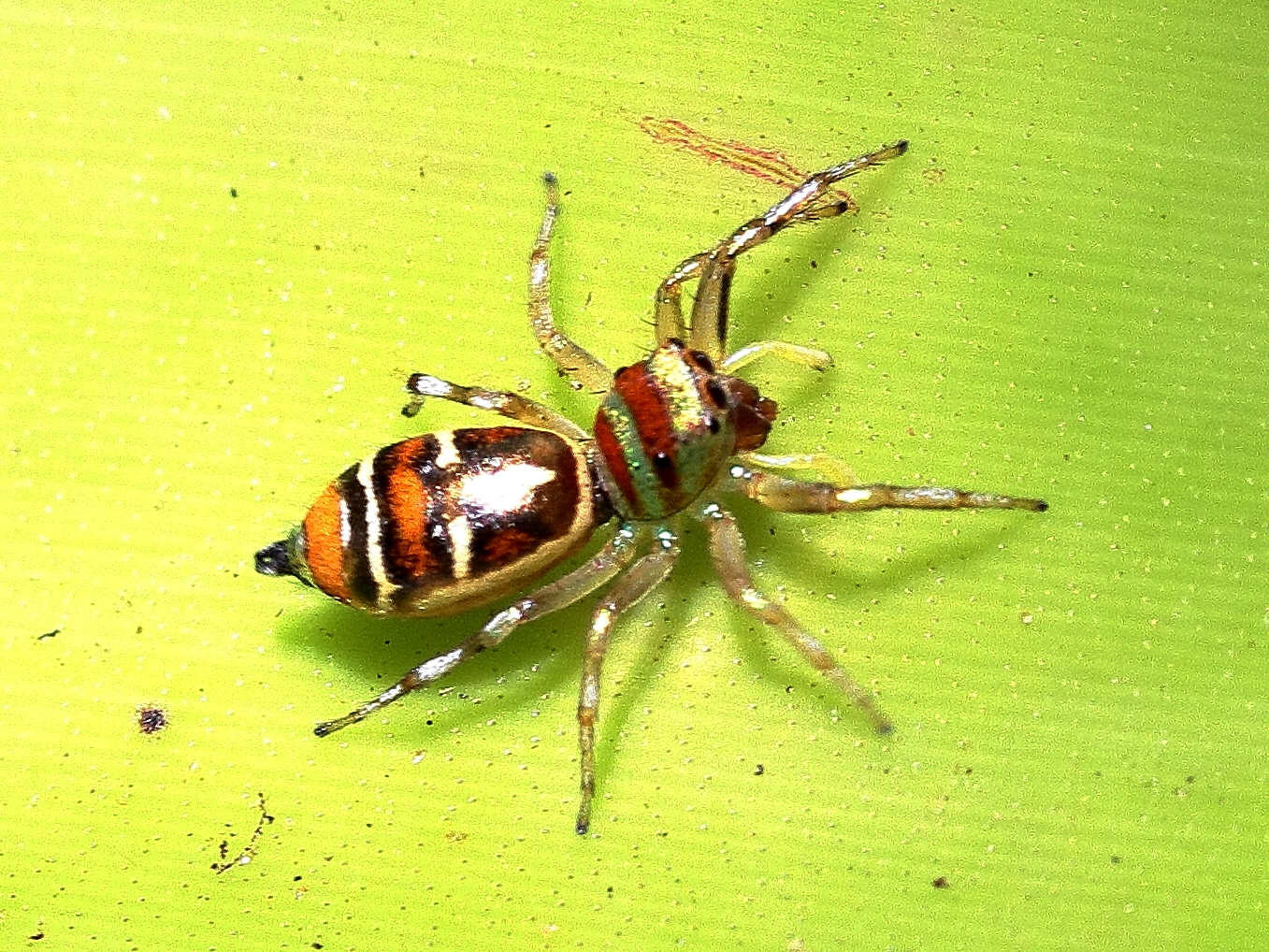
Female in Cairns
