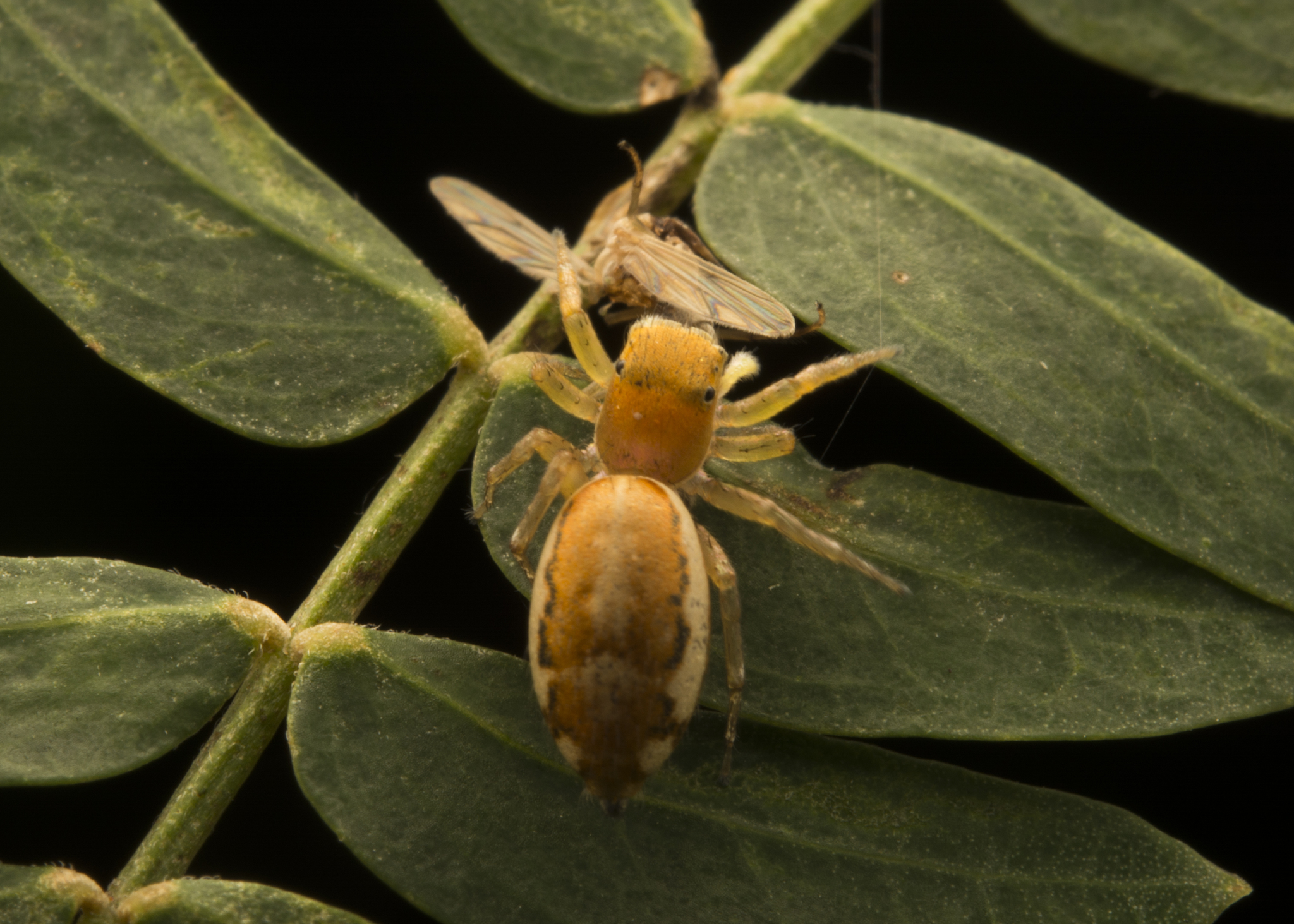
- Female with prey
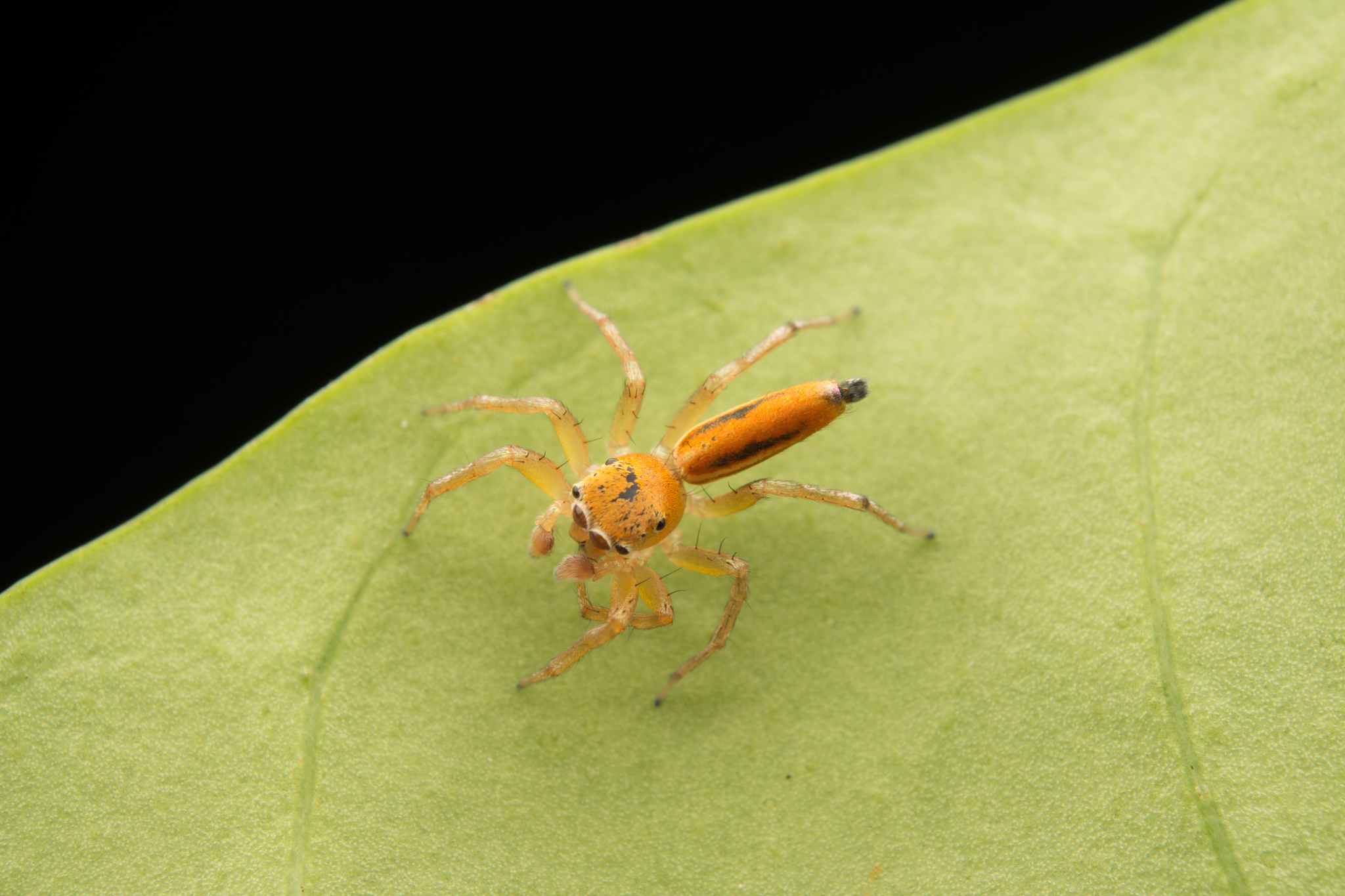
- Male C. lami

Scientific classification
- Kingdom: Animalia
- Phylum: Arthropoda
- Subphylum: Chelicerata
- Class: Arachnida
- Order: Araneae
- Infraorder: Araneomorphae
- Family: Salticidae
- Genus: Cosmophasis
- Species: C. lami

Binomial name
- Cosmophasis lami Berry, Beatty & Prószyński, 1997

Synonyms
- Cosmophasis squamata (Saaristo, 2002)

= Cosmophasis lami =

Species of jumping spider

Cosmophasis lami, also known as the Lami Beach northern jumping spider or tangerine garden jumper, is a species of jumping spider in the genus Cosmophasis, probably native to South East Asia and some pacific islands, and possibly introduced to Japan and Okinawa Islands by humans. It was first described by Berry, Beatty & Prószynski in 1997 and has one synonym, Cosmophasis squamata (Saaristo, 2002) (Note: not to be confused with the other species.) Both the female and the male have been described.

== Description ==
Exact description may vary, but the species displays sexual dimorphism, with females' coloration being more vibrant. Adult C. lami's carapace is orange-brown. a dark-brown area around the eyes, and coated in orange hairs and the clypeus is orange-brown. The males are coated in orange hairs, cephalothorax are dull orange, abdomen is orange and slender, clypeus orange-brown, black apex and spinnerets and a dark-brown area around the eyes. Females are almost similar, with the only difference being a grayish brown sternum and different abdominal markings. It is similar to C. hortoni, but is smaller, the chelicerae shorter, with a longer embolus of the male palp, which is southeast from the bulb.

There is a iridescencent morph.

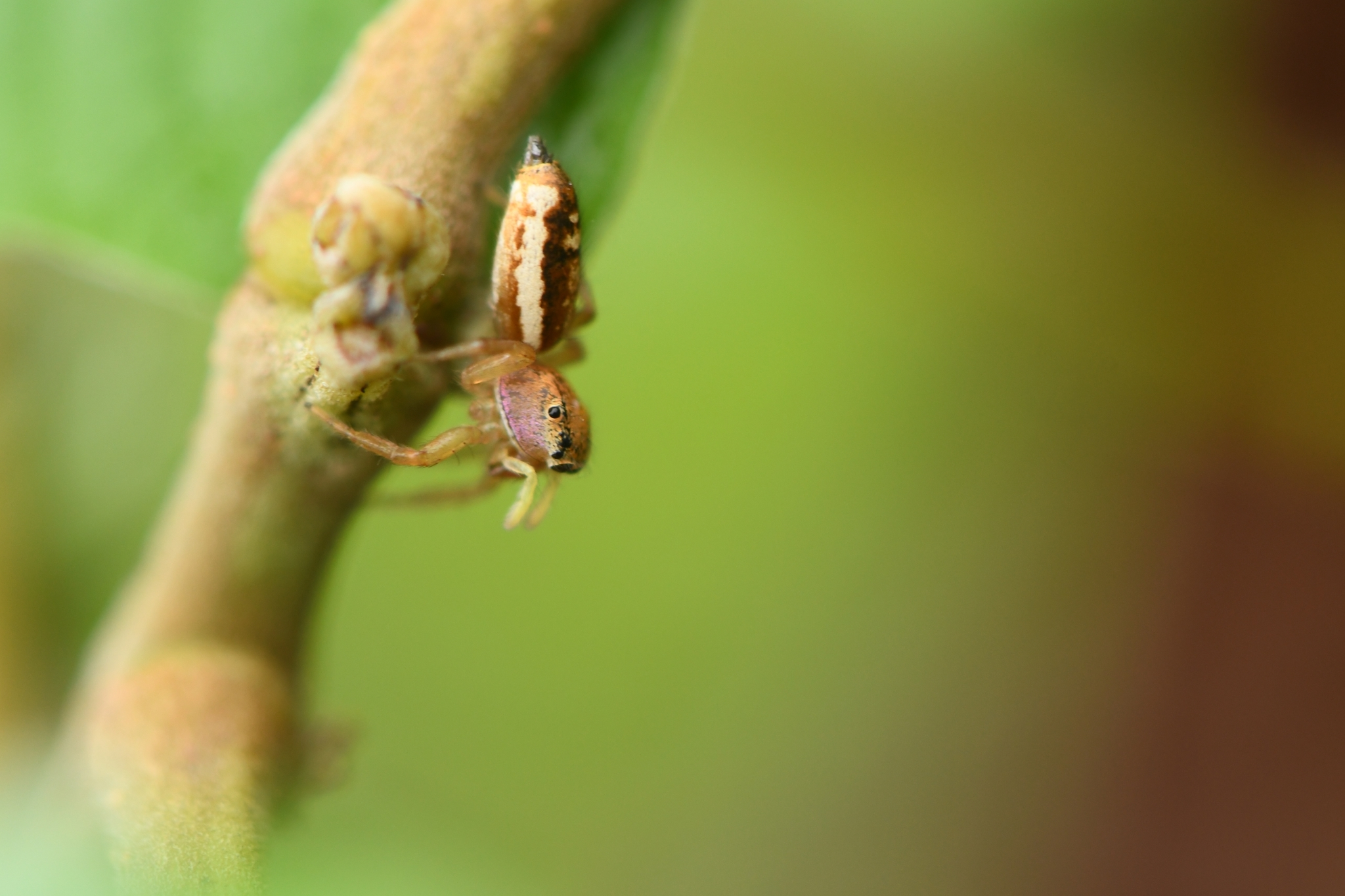
Female C. lami with iridescent morph

== Etymology ==
The first recorded specimen of C. lami is a male collected on 3 May 1987 by Joseph Beatty and E.R. Berry from Fiji on shrub foliage in Lami, Fiji and the species was named after it (the location). The name was first published in January 1997 along with Ascyltus similis, Ascyltus rhizophora, Bavia fedor, Bavia sonsorol, Cosmophasis arborea, Cosmophasis muralis, Flacillula nitens, Ligurra opelli, Thorelliola dumicola, and Trite ponapensis.

== Distribution ==
Considered the most widely distributed salticid from Cosmophasis, Cosmophasis lami was first observed in Fiji and is native to South East Asia, Philippines, Cocos Islands, Mauritius, and the Marquesas Islands. The World Spider Catalog says that it is introduced to Seychelles, Marquesas Island, Society Islands, Fiji, and Hawaii. In 2013, it was first recorded in Japan by Tatsumi Suguro. Eight years later, it was recorded in Okinawa Island on roadside vegetation in an residential area, probably by artificial introduction. In 2021, specimens were recorded in Taiwan.

== Ecology ==
Although little is known about its ecology, it is known that Cosmophasis lami are peridomestic carnivorous arthropod predators. Males do not exhibit stereotypical behavior while in a fight between other males in a study. Common behaviour of the males include vertical “pumping” movements of the pedipalps and continual vertical movement of the abdomen.

== Relations with humans ==
Cosmophasis lami is called homura-haetori (flame fly-removal) in Japanese, and is not considered a pest. In Taiwan, it is called as ramayyu jumping spider"(拉邁宇跳蛛) or "lamaiyu jumping spider" (拉邁宇跳蛛).
