= Cosmophasis olorina =

Scientific classification
- Kingdom: Animalia
- Phylum: Arthropoda
- Subphylum: Chelicerata
- Class: Arachnida
- Order: Araneae
- Infraorder: Araneomorphae
- Family: Salticidae
- Genus: Cosmophasis
- Species: C. olorina

Binomial name
- Cosmophasis olorina (Simon, 1901)

Synonyms
- Telamonia olorina Simon, 1901

Species of spider

Cosmophasis olorina is a species of spider of the family Salticidae. It is endemic to Sri Lanka. Only the male has been described.

== Taxonomy ==
C. olorina was first described as Telamonia olorina in "Descriptions d'arachnides noveaux de la familie des Attidae (suite)" by Eugène Simon in 1901. Then, in 1984, Jerzy Prószyński moved it to Cosmophasis.
