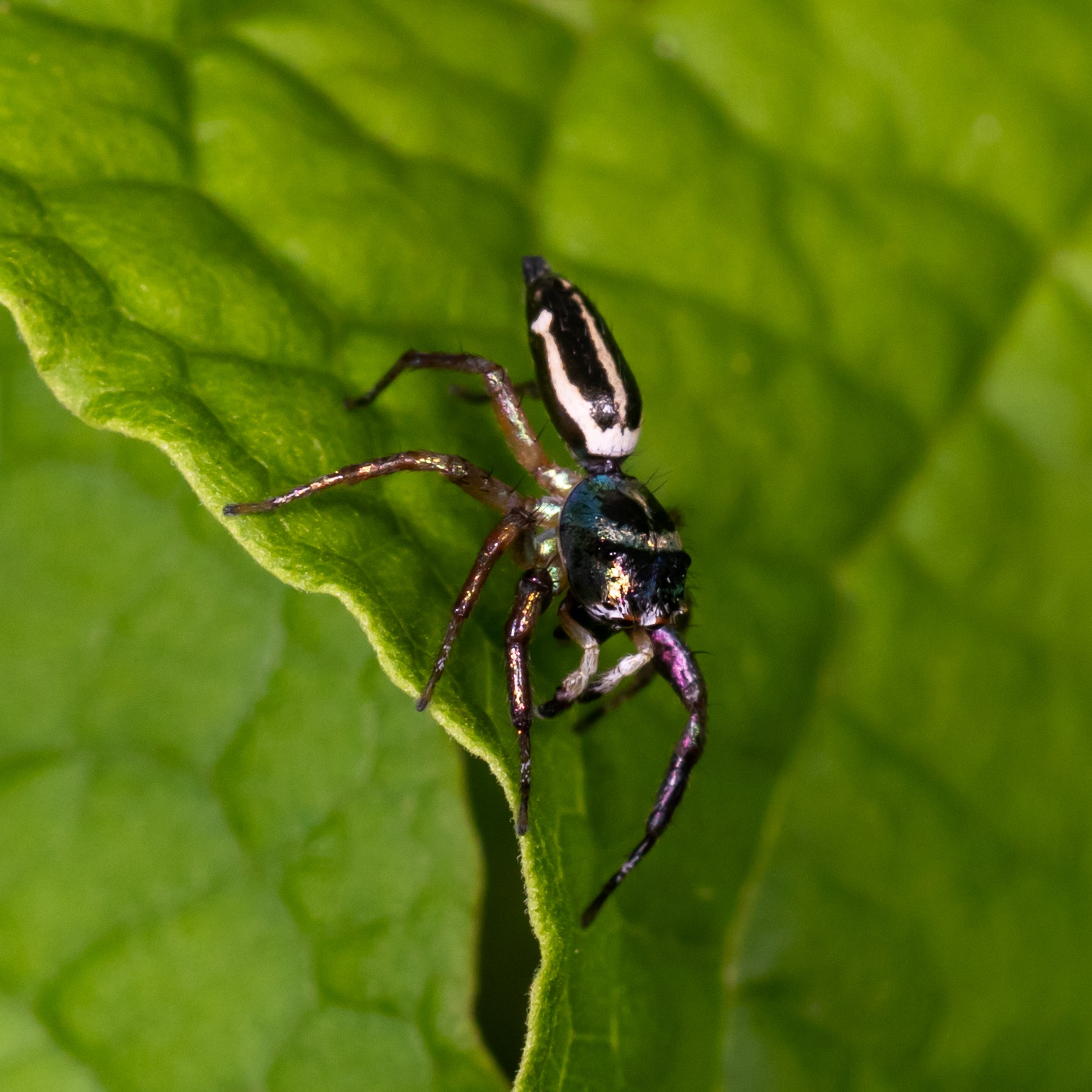
- from Sulawesi

Scientific classification
- Kingdom: Animalia
- Phylum: Arthropoda
- Subphylum: Chelicerata
- Class: Arachnida
- Order: Araneae
- Infraorder: Araneomorphae
- Family: Salticidae
- Genus: Cosmophasis
- Species: C. ombria

Binomial name
- Cosmophasis ombria (Thorell, 1877)

Synonyms
- Maevia ombria Thorell, 1877; Maevia marxii Thorell, 1890; Cosmophasis marxi (Thorell, 1890)

= Cosmophasis ombria =

Species of jumping spider

Cosmophasis ombria is a species of jumping spider in the family Salticidae. It was originally described as Maevia ombria by Tamerlan Thorell in 1877.

== Taxonomy ==
The species was originally described by Thorell in 1877 as Maevia ombria based on a male specimen from Kendari, Sulawesi. Thorell later described Maevia marxii in 1890, which was subsequently treated as a synonym.

The species was transferred to the genus Cosmophasis and treated as C. marxi by Prószyński in 1984. However, Żabka and Waldock reinstated the original name C. ombria in 2012, removing it from synonymy with Cosmophasis viridifasciata and establishing C. marxi as a junior synonym.

== Distribution ==
C. ombria is distributed across Indonesia, including Sumatra, Java, Sulawesi, and the Krakatau Islands, with records also from Hainan in southern China. The species has been collected from various locations in the Krakatau Islands, including Anak Krakatau, Pulau Krakatau Kecil (Panjang), and Pulau Sertung.

== Description ==
Males have a cephalothorax covered in pearly scale-hairs that are more numerous on the sides and anterior to the eye-field, which has a metallic shine. The eye-field is dark brown with black eye surroundings, and there is a fringe above the anterior eyes. The abdomen is mottled brown, darkening posteriorly, with a light creamy belt around the anterior half and a cream central longitudinal stripe with paired spots on the sides.

Females have a brown cephalothorax with a greyish-light brown eye-field containing numerous creamy scales and scattered brown bristles. The thoracic area and sides are lighter and mottled orange with white scales. The abdomen is covered with brownish scale-hairs and displays a pattern of three yellow transverse stripes joining a central longitudinal stripe, with a wide yellow stripe bordering the anterior abdomen.

The male palpal organ is characterized by a relatively small tegulum and a long, wavy embolus positioned at 9 o'clock. Females have epigynal fossae without distinctive borders, divided by a wide median guide, with a strongly sclerotised posterior epigynal edge and elongate, L-shaped spermathecae.
