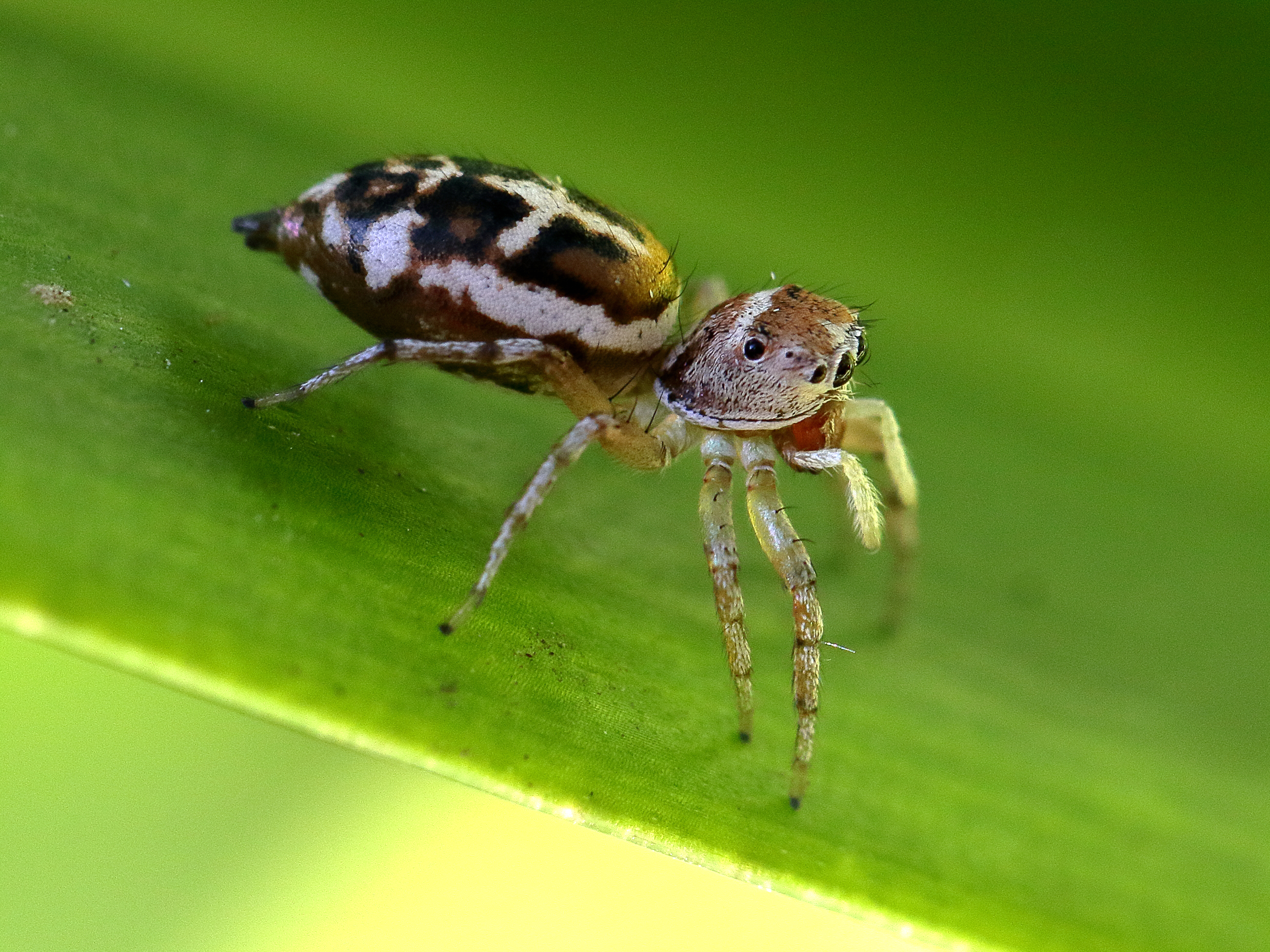
- Female Cairns, Queensland, Australia

Scientific classification
- Kingdom: Animalia
- Phylum: Arthropoda
- Subphylum: Chelicerata
- Class: Arachnida
- Order: Araneae
- Infraorder: Araneomorphae
- Family: Salticidae
- Genus: Cosmophasis
- Species: C. baehrae

Binomial name
- Cosmophasis baehrae Żabka & Waldock, 2012

= Cosmophasis baehrae =

Jumping spider from Australia

Cosmophasis baehrae is a species of jumping spider found in Australia and the Moluccas, and first described in 2012 by Marek Zabka and Julianne Waldock. It is named after entomologist Barbara Baehr.

== Description ==
Cosmophasis baehrae has the inner two forward looking eyes greatly enlarged, typical of the jumping spider family, Salticidae. Diagnostic for this species is a white bar on the carapace just behind the rearmost pair of eyes. The body length of the male is 7 mm (0.28 in) and female 5 mm (0.20 in).

== Distribution ==
Cosmophasis baehrae has been found along northern coastal regions of Australia in Queensland and Western Australia. Outside Australia it has been found in the Moluccas in Indonesia.

== Gallery ==
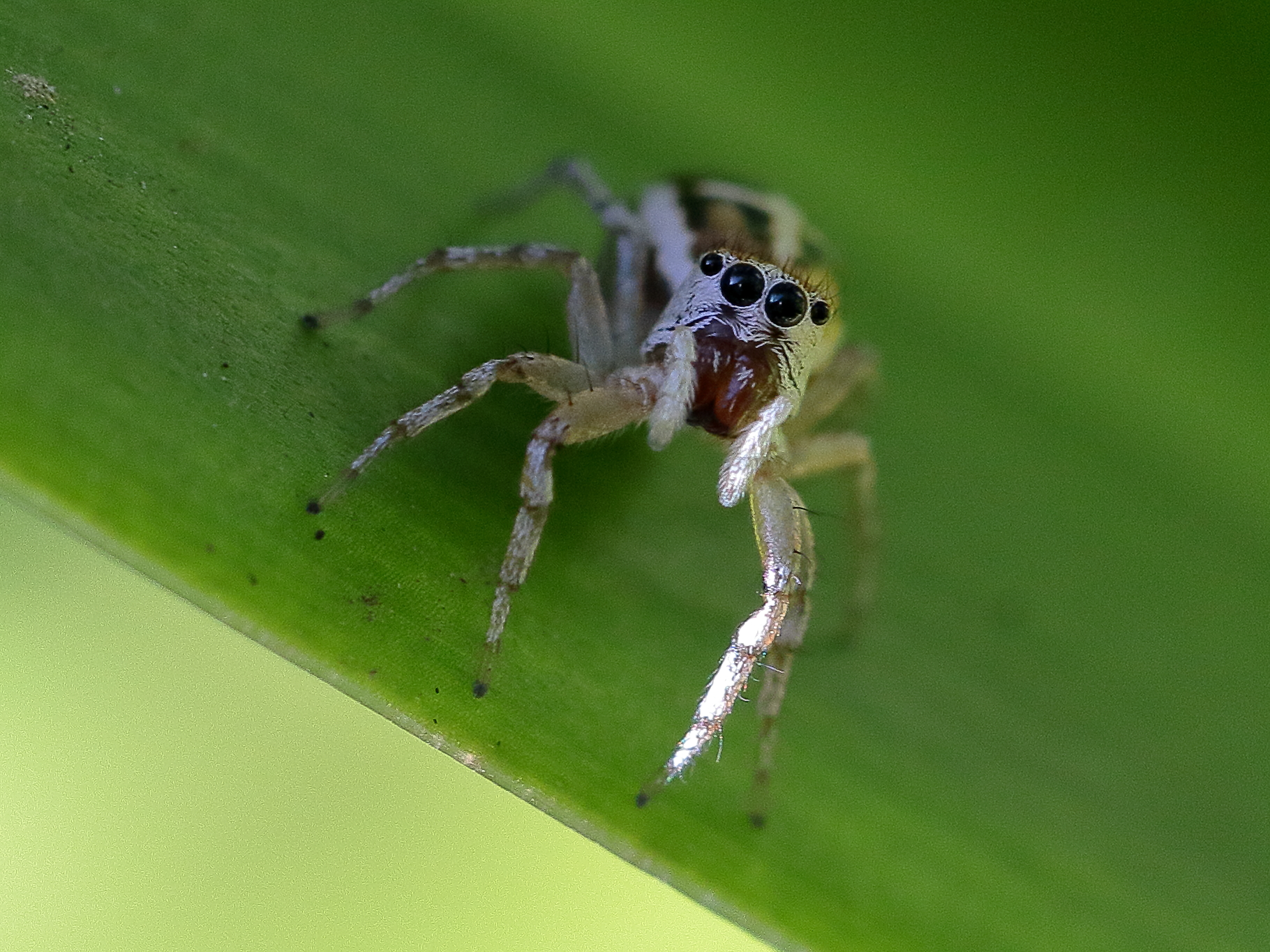
Female Cosmophasis baehrae front view

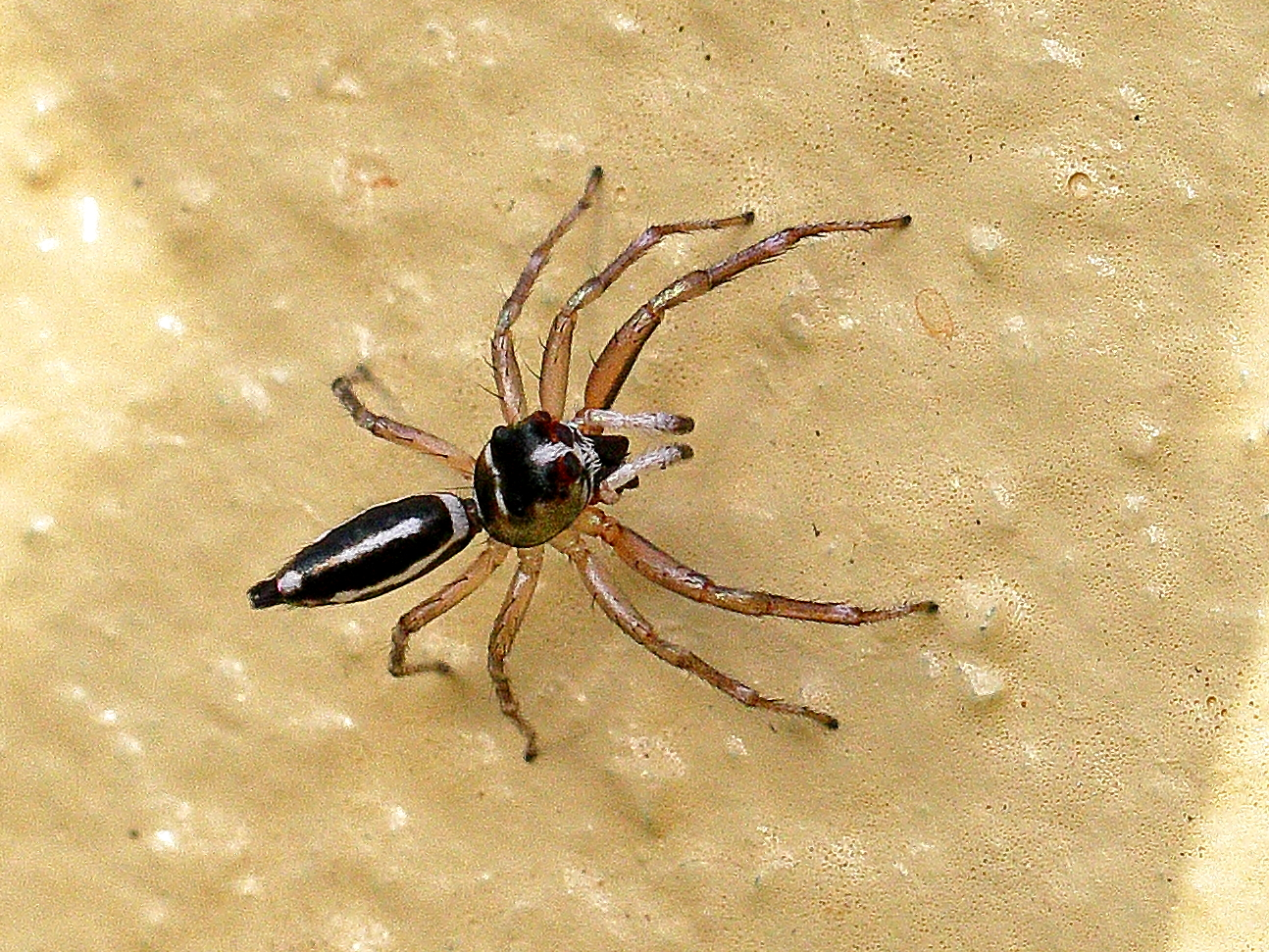
Male distinguished by the vertical white mark between the anterior median eyes
