= Nasinu (Indian Communal Constituency, Fiji) =

Former electoral division of Fiji

Nasinu Indian Communal is a former electoral division of Fiji, one of 19 communal constituencies reserved for Indo-Fijians. Established by the 1997 Constitution, it came into being in 1999 and was used for the parliamentary elections of 1999, 2001, and 2006. (Of the remaining 52 seats, 27 were reserved for other ethnic communities and 25, called Open Constituencies, were elected by universal suffrage). The electorate covered the Town of Nasinu, Fiji's second-largest urban centre, north of Suva.

The 2013 Constitution promulgated by the Military-backed interim government abolished all constituencies and established a form of proportional representation, with the entire country voting as a single electorate.

== Election results ==
In the following tables, the primary vote refers to first-preference votes cast. The final vote refers to the final tally after votes for low-polling candidates have been progressively redistributed to other candidates according to pre-arranged electoral agreements (see electoral fusion), which may be customized by the voters (see instant run-off voting).

=== 1999 ===
Candidate	Political party	Votes	%
Pratap Chand	Fiji Labour Party (FLP)	7,725	73.62
Vijendra Prakash	National Federation Party (NFP)	2,735	26.06
Clement Claudius Joseph	Coalition of Independent Nationals (COIN)	34	0.32
Total		10,494	100.00

=== 2001 ===
Candidate	Political party	Votes	%
Pratap Chand	Fiji Labour Party (FLP)	7,638	84.49
Vijendra Prakash	National Federation Party (NFP)	1,266	14.00
Muttu Sami Goundar	New Labour Unity Party (NLUP)	128	1.42
Deeneshwar	Fijian Association Party (FAP)	8	0.09
Total		9,040	100.00

=== 2006 ===
Candidate	Political party	Votes	%
Krishna Datt	Fiji Labour Party (FLP)	10,940	90.89
Mohammed Khalim	National Federation Party (NFP)	615	5.11
Imraz Iqbal Ali	Soqosoqo Duavata ni Lewenivanua (SDL)	226	1.88
Liaquat Khan	National Alliance Party (NAPF)	222	1.84
Fatima Bano Shah	National Alliance Party (NAPF)	28	0.23
Hari Prasad Sharma	Soqosoqo Duavata ni Lewenivanua (SDL)	5	0.04
Total		12,036	100.00

== Sources ==
- Psephos - Adam Carr's electoral archive
- Fiji Facts
