= Parmod Chand =

Fijian politician

Member of the Fijian Parliament for NFP List
- In office 21 March 2017 – 14 November 2018

Member of the Fijian Parliament for Macuata East Indian Communal Constituency
- In office 25 February 1994 – 15 May 1999
- Succeeded by: None (constituency disestablished)

Personal details
- Born: Labasa, Fiji
- Party: National Federation Party

Parmod Chand (sometimes known as Pramod Chand) (born 1955 or 1956) is a Fijian politician and former member of the Parliament of Fiji. He is a member of the National Federation Party (NFP).

== Background and family life ==
Chand was born in Labasa on Vanua Levu. His father was NFP politician Vishnu Prasad. He worked as a businessman and sugarcane farmer, and ran a bus company. He has served as president of the Fiji Bus Operators Association.

Chand is also a pastor for the Assemblies of God church in Labasa.

== Political career ==
Chand served on the Labasa town council between 1992 and 1996. He was first elected to the House of Representatives of Fiji in the 1994 general election, winning the Macuata East Indian Communal Constituency for the NFP. He contested the Macuata East Open Constituency in the 1999 and 2006 elections, losing on both occasions by large margins.

In January 2006, Pramod Chand as the NFP's Senior Vice-President condemned the Fiji Labour Party for offering support to the Military to depose the government. "The FLP is now trying to return to power not through the ballot box but by the barrel of the gun," he said. He called the call "treasonous" and "treachery of the highest order", and called for a police investigation into public statements from the FLP's President, Jokapeci Koroi.

When elections were restored after the 2006 Fijian coup d'état he contested the 2014 election for the NFP, winning 1014 votes. This was not enough to secure election, but he re-entered parliament in 2017 following the resignation of former NFP MP Tupou Draunidalo.

In December 2017 Chand was questioned by police over allegations of sedition, however no charges were laid.

Chand stood as a candidate in the 2018 election but gained only 864 votes and was not re-elected. He stood again at the 2022 election, winning 1857 votes, but again missed out on re-election.
