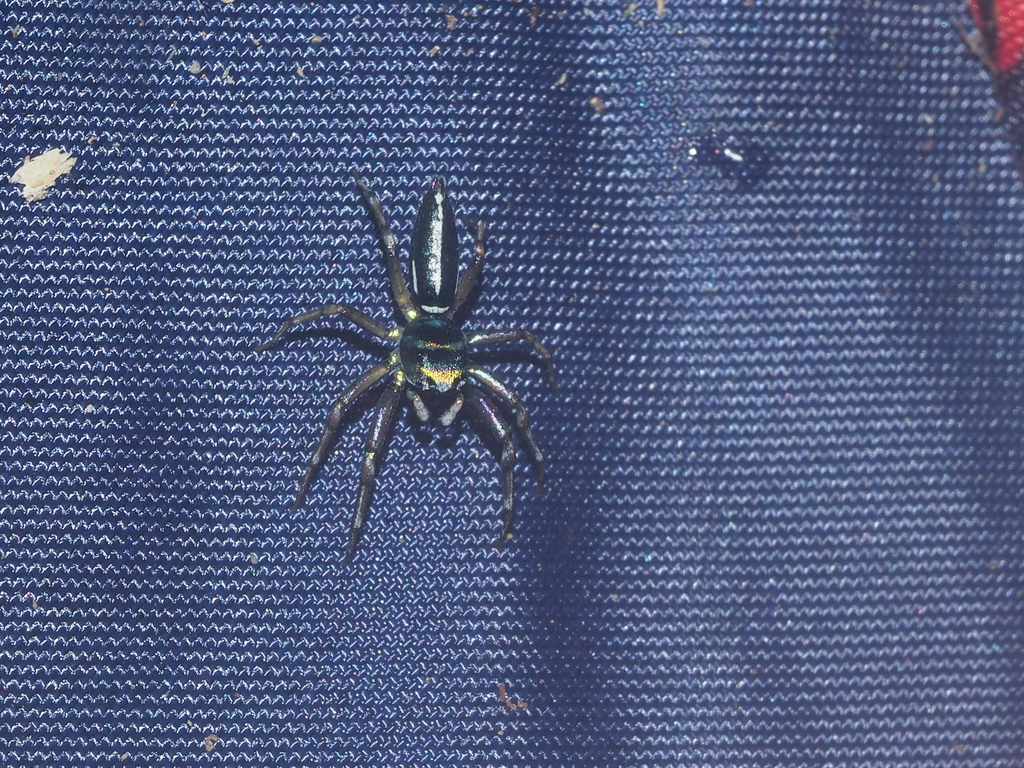
- Male in Java
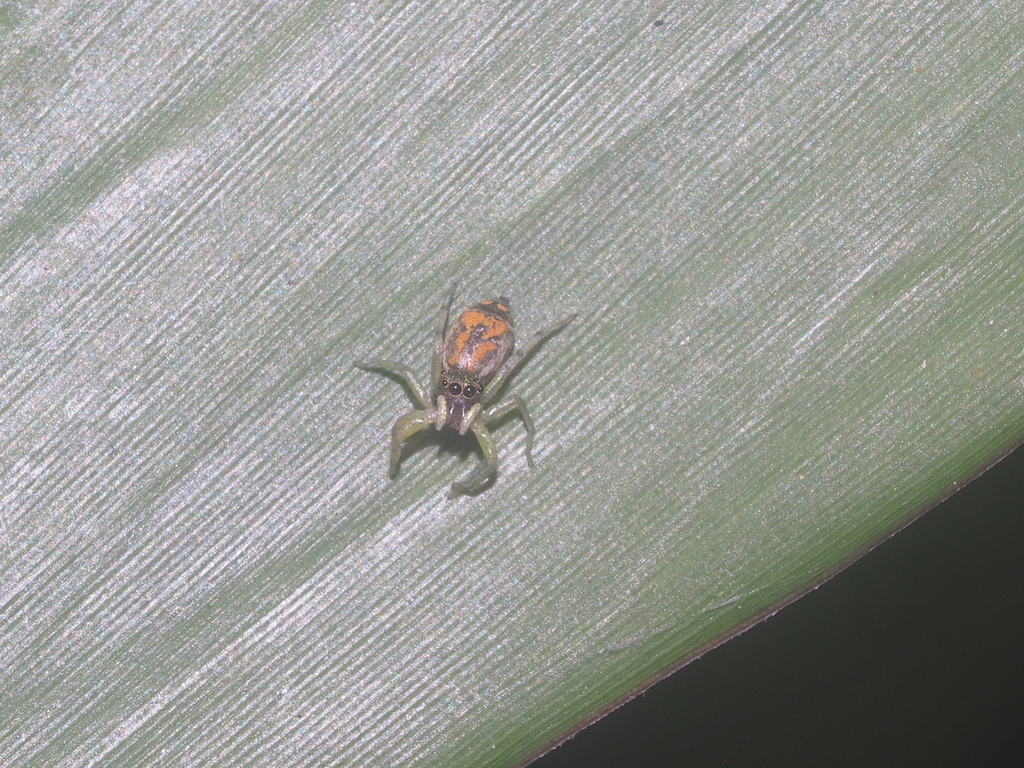
- Female from Java

Scientific classification
- Kingdom: Animalia
- Phylum: Arthropoda
- Subphylum: Chelicerata
- Class: Arachnida
- Order: Araneae
- Infraorder: Araneomorphae
- Family: Salticidae
- Genus: Cosmophasis
- Species: C. gemmans

Binomial name
- Cosmophasis gemmans (Thorell, 1890)

Synonyms
- Maevia gemmans Thorell, 1890

= Cosmophasis gemmans =

Species of arachnid

Cosmophasis gemmans is a species of jumping spider in the family Salticidae. Only the male has been described. The type specimen is deposited at the Museo Civico di Storia Naturale di Genova. These spiders are typically found on the Indonesian island of Sumatra.

== Taxonomy ==
The species was first described as Maevia gemmans by Tamerlan Thorell in 1890 in Diagnoses aranearum aliquot novarum in Indo-Malesia inventarum, based on a male specimen from Sumatra collected by Odoardo Beccari in 1878, which is now stored at the Museo Civico di Storia Naturale di Genova. In 1955, Carl Friedrich Roewer transferred the species to the genus Cosmophasis.
