= Cosmophasis albipes =

Scientific classification
- Kingdom: Animalia
- Phylum: Arthropoda
- Subphylum: Chelicerata
- Class: Arachnida
- Order: Araneae
- Infraorder: Araneomorphae
- Family: Salticidae
- Genus: Cosmophasis
- Species: C. albipes

Binomial name
- Cosmophasis albipes Berland & Millot, 1941

Species of jumping spider

Cosmophasis albipes is a species of jumping spider in the genus Cosmophasis. The type specimen of the species is a female, collected on 1 August in nowadays Guinea.

== Description ==
The females' cephalothorax is light fawn, the cephalic part has a large black spot that covers the posterior eyes, arching before the dimple, the thoracic part having a blackish oblique zone. Chelicerae are brown, darker than cephalothorax, mouthparts are very fawn, and abdomen is whitish, with four white-speckled blackish lines, the first pair going to the middle, the last touching the spinnerets, and black hairs. Both the underside and spinnerets are white.

== Distribution ==
The type locality is from Macenta, French Guinea.

== Taxonomy ==
It is assigned to the genus Cosmophasis due to having lateral spines on the anterior metatarsals. It is closely related with the genus Telamonia.
