= Macuata East (Open Constituency, Fiji) =

Former electoral constituency in Fiji

Macuata Open is a former electoral division of Fiji, one of 25 open constituencies that were elected by universal suffrage (the remaining 46 seats, called communal constituencies, were allocated by ethnicity). Established by the 1997 Constitution, it came into being in 1999 and was used for the parliamentary elections of 1999, 2001, and 2006. The electorate was located in north-eastern Vanua Levu, and has been a stronghold of the Fiji Labour Party (FLP) since its inception.

The 2013 Constitution promulgated by the Military-backed interim government abolished all constituencies and established a form of proportional representation, with the entire country voting as a single electorate.

== Election results ==
In the following tables, the primary vote refers to first-preference votes cast. The final vote refers to the final tally after votes for low-polling candidates have been progressively redistributed to other candidates according to pre-arranged electoral agreements (see electoral fusion), which may be customized by the voters (see instant run-off voting).

=== 1999 ===
Candidate	Political Party	Votes	%
Krishna Datt	Fiji Labour Party (FLP)	8,807	58.92
Pramod Chand	National Federation Party (NFP)	4,038	27.01
Joeli Tumuri	Christian Democratic Alliance (VLV)	1,532	10.25
Mehi Lal	(UNLP)	571	3.82
Total		14,948	100.00

=== 2001 ===
Candidate	Political party	Votes	%
Krishna Datt	Fiji Labour Party (FLP)	8,624	64.34
Solomone Catarogo	Conservative Alliance (CAMV)	1,586	11.83
Mohammed Rafiq	National Federation Party (NFP)	1,491	11.12
Joeli Tumuri	Soqosoqo Duavata ni Lewenivanua (SDL) [1]	877	6.54
Hafiz Abdul	New Labour Unity Party (NLUP)	529	3.95
Eroni Alekisa	Soqosoqo Duavata ni Lewenivanua (SDL) [1]	168	1.25
Sivo Lusiana Ravuwale	Soqosoqo Duavata ni Lewenivanua (SDL) [1]	129	0.96
Total		13,404	100.00
[1] Note that the SDL nominated not one but three candidates for this constituency.

=== 2006 ===
Candidate	Political party	Votes	%
Agni Deo Singh	Fiji Labour Party (FLP)	8,357	62.51
Iliesa Seru	Soqosoqo Duavata ni Lewenivanua (SDL)	3,343	25.01
Pramod Chand	National Federation Party (NFP)	1,669	12.48
Total		13,369	100.00

== Sources ==
- Psephos - Adam Carr's electoral archive
- Fiji Facts
