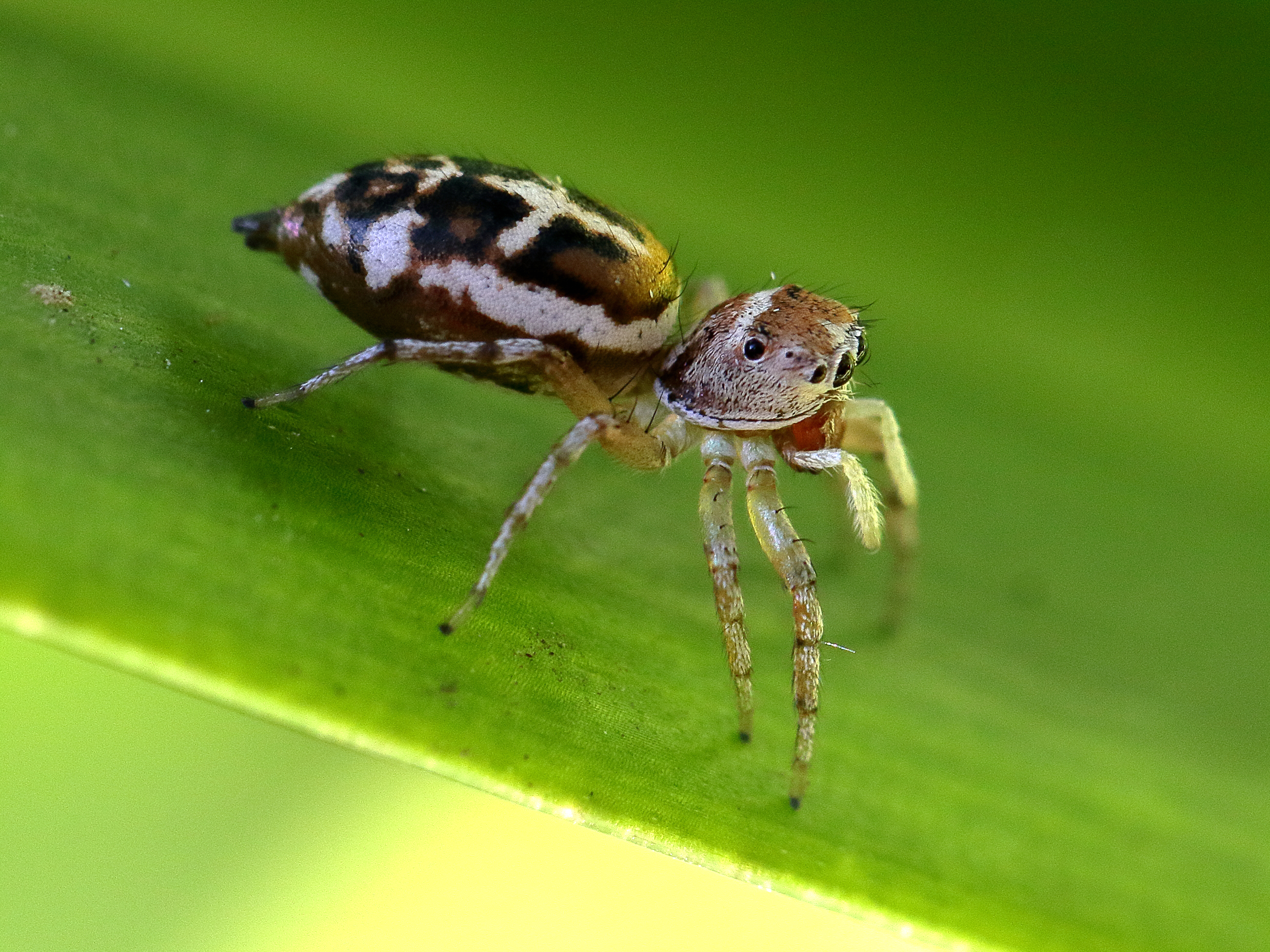
- Cosmophasis baehrae

Scientific classification
- Kingdom: Animalia
- Phylum: Arthropoda
- Subphylum: Chelicerata
- Class: Arachnida
- Order: Araneae
- Infraorder: Araneomorphae
- Family: Salticidae
- Tribe: Chrysillini
- Genus: Cosmophasis; Simon, 1901

Type species
- Plexippus thalassinus C. L. Koch

Species
- See text.

= Cosmophasis =

Genus of spiders

Cosmophasis is a genus of spiders in the family Salticidae (jumping spiders). They are predominantly Southeast Asian, while some species occur in Africa and Australia. Although most species more or less mimic ants, some also colorful species follow a different strategy.

C. bitaeniata uses chemical mimicry to be accepted by the aggressive weaver ant species Oecophylla smaragdina.

One species, said to be not a particularly good ant mimic, was observed living near and preying on ants. According to Murphy and Murphy, 2000, "to watch the spider stalking and killing its prey is an arachnological spectacular".

== Description ==
Species in this genus are from 3.80 to 8.00 mm long. Their cephalothoraces are pear-shaped (for some males) or rectangular.

== Taxonomy ==
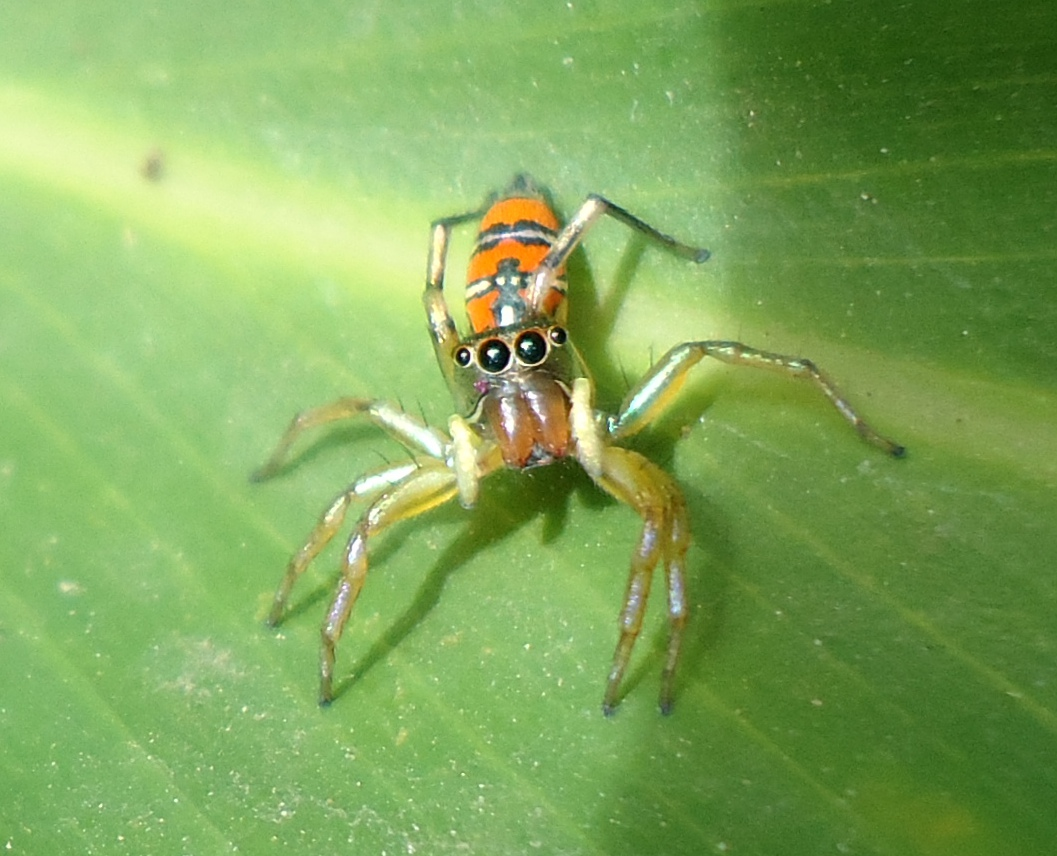
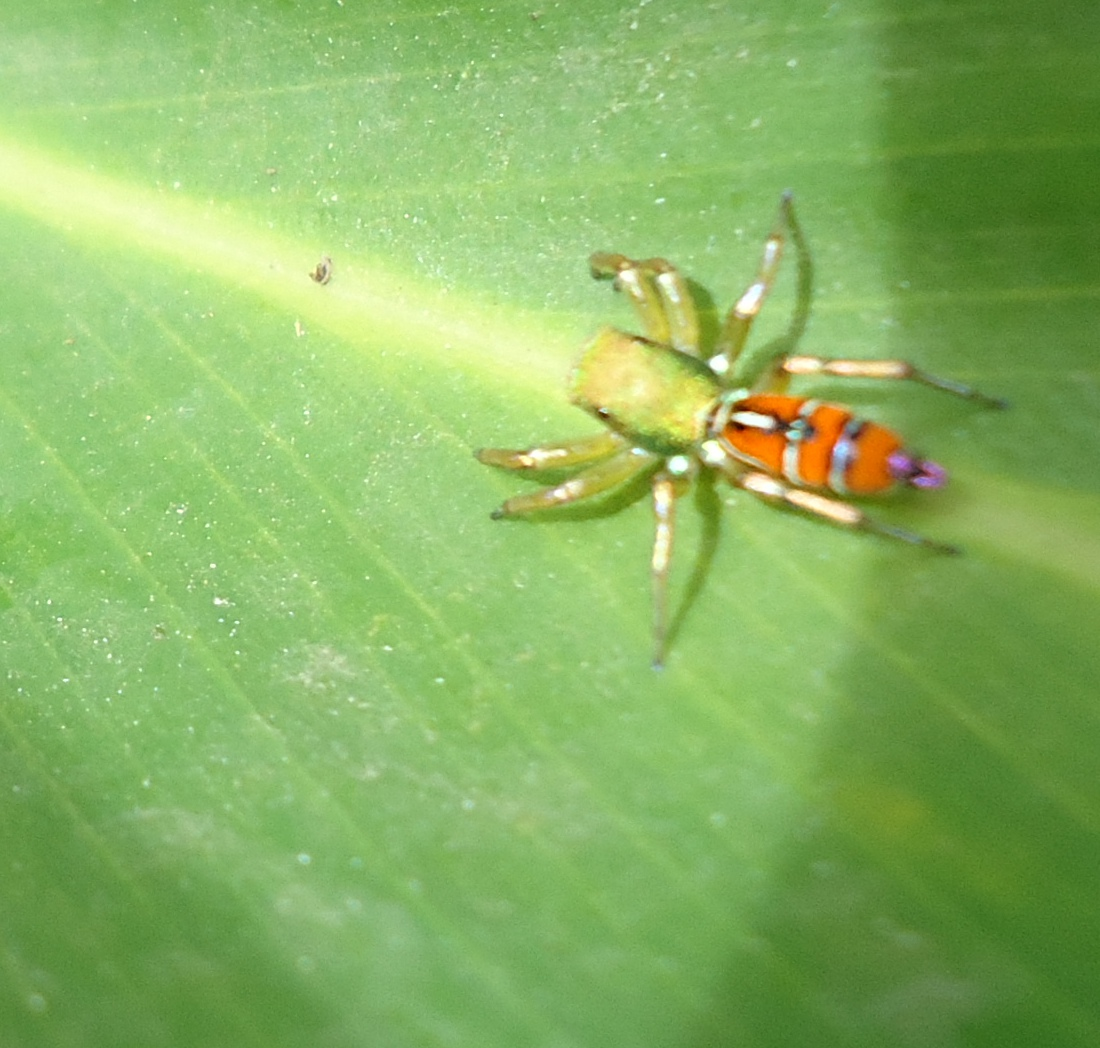
Cosmophasis sp. from the Philippines

As of November 2021, the World Spider Catalog accepted these species:

- Cosmophasis albipes Berland & Millot, 1941 – Guinea
- Cosmophasis albomaculata Schenkel, 1944 – Timor
- Cosmophasis ambonensis Hurni-Cranston & Hill, 2020 - Ambon Island
- Cosmophasis arborea Berry, Beatty & Prószyński, 1997 – Caroline Islands
- Cosmophasis baehrae Zabka & Waldock, 2012 - Australia
- Cosmophasis bandaneira Hurni-Cranston & Hill, 2020 - Banda Islands
- Cosmophasis banika Żabka & Waldock, 2012 - Solomon Islands
- Cosmophasis bitaeniata (Keyserling, 1882) – New Guinea, Australia, Micronesia
- Cosmophasis chlorophthalma (Simon, 1898) – New Hebrides
- Cosmophasis chopardi Berland & Millot, 1941 – Ivory Coast
- Cosmophasis colemani Żabka & Waldock, 2012 – Australia (Queensland)
- Cosmophasis courti Żabka & Waldock, 2012 – New Guinea
- Cosmophasis cypria (Thorell, 1890) – Java
- Cosmophasis darwini Żabka & Waldock, 2012 – Australia (Northern Territory)
- Cosmophasis depilata Caporiacco, 1940 – Ethiopia
- Cosmophasis estrellaensis Barrion & Litsinger, 1995 – Philippines
- Cosmophasis fazanica Caporiacco, 1936 – Libya
- Cosmophasis gemmans (Thorell, 1890) – Sumatra
- Cosmophasis harveyi Żabka & Waldock, 2012 – New Guinea
- Cosmophasis hortoni Żabka & Waldock, 2012 – Solomon Is.
- Cosmophasis humphreysi Żabka & Waldock, 2012 – New Guinea
- Cosmophasis kairiru Żabka & Waldock, 2012 – New Guinea
- Cosmophasis kohi Żabka & Waldock, 2012 – New Guinea
- Cosmophasis lami Berry, Beatty & Prószyński, 1997 – East Asia, South East Asia, Pacific islands
- Cosmophasis laticlavia (Thorell, 1892) – Sumatra
- Cosmophasis lucidiventris Simon, 1910 – Gabon
- Cosmophasis lungga Żabka & Waldock, 2012 – Solomon Islands
- Cosmophasis maculiventris Strand, 1911 – Aru Islands
- Cosmophasis masarangi Merian, 1911 – Sulawesi
- Cosmophasis micans (L. Koch, 1880) – Queensland
- Cosmophasis micarioides (L. Koch, 1880) – New Guinea, Queensland, Solomon Islands
- Cosmophasis miniaceomicans (Simon, 1888) – Andaman Islands
- Cosmophasis modesta (L. Koch, 1880) – Queensland
- Cosmophasis monacha (Thorell, 1881) – New Guinea
- Cosmophasis motmot Żabka & Waldock, 2012 – New Guinea
- Cosmophasis obscura (Keyserling, 1882) – Queensland
- Cosmophasis olorina (Simon, 1901) – Sri Lanka
- Cosmophasis ombria (Thorell, 1877) – Indonesia (Sumatra, Java, Sulawesi, Krakatau)
- Cosmophasis orsimoides Strand, 1911 – Kei Islands
- Cosmophasis panjangensis Żabka & Waldock, 2012 – Indonesia (Krakatau)
- Cosmophasis parangpilota Barrion & Litsinger, 1995 – Philippines
- Cosmophasis psittacina (Thorell, 1887) – Myanmar
- Cosmophasis pulchella Caporiacco, 1947 – Ethiopia
- Cosmophasis quadricincta (Simon, 1885) – Singapore
- Cosmophasis rakata Żabka & Waldock, 2012 – Indonesia (Krakatau)
- Cosmophasis risbeci Berland, 1938 – New Hebrides
- Cosmophasis sertungensis Żabka & Waldock, 2012 – Indonesia (Krakatau)
- Cosmophasis squamata Kulczyński, 1910 – Solomon Islands, Seychelles
- Cosmophasis strandi Caporiacco, 1947 – East Africa
- Cosmophasis tavurvur Żabka & Waldock, 2012 – New Guinea
- Cosmophasis thalassina (C. L. Koch, 1846) – Malaysia to Australia
- Cosmophasis tricincta Simon, 1910 – Bioko
- Cosmophasis trioipina Barrion & Litsinger, 1995 – Philippines
- Cosmophasis tristriatus (L. Koch, 1880) – Palau Is.
- Cosmophasis trobriand Żabka & Waldock, 2012 – New Guinea
- Cosmophasis umbratica Simon, 1903 – India to Sumatra
- Cosmophasis valerieae Prószyński & Deeleman-Reinhold, 2010 – Indonesia (Java, Lesser Sunda Is.)
- Cosmophasis viridifasciata (Doleschall, 1859) – Sumatra to New Guinea
- Cosmophasis waeri Hurni-Cranston & Hill, 2020 - Banda Islands
- Cosmophasis weyersi (Simon, 1899) – Sumatra
- Cosmophasis xiaolonghaensis Cao & Li, 2016

In 2012, Marek Żabka and Julianne Waldock proposed 5 new species groups, it being the C.thalassina species group, C. bitaeniata species group, C. micarioides species group, C. tristriatus species group, and the C. rakata species group. Formerly placed in this genus include:

- Cosmophasis australis Simon, 1902 → Phintella australis
- Cosmophasis caerulea Simon, 1901 → Mexcala caerulea
- Cosmophasis fagei Lessert, 1925 → Icius fagei
- Cosmophasis nigrocyanea (Simon, 1885) → Mexcala nigrocyanea
- Cosmophasis quadrimaculata Lawrence, 1942 → Mexcala quadrimaculata
- Cosmophasis longiventris Simon, 1903 → Chrysilla lauta
