= Cosmophasis ambonensis =

Scientific classification
- Kingdom: Animalia
- Phylum: Arthropoda
- Subphylum: Chelicerata
- Class: Arachnida
- Order: Araneae
- Infraorder: Araneomorphae
- Family: Salticidae
- Genus: Cosmophasis
- Species: C. ambonensis

Binomial name
- Cosmophasis ambonensis Hurni-Cranston, & Hill,2021

Species of jumping spider

Cosmophasis ambonensis is a species of jumping spider described in 2021. The male holotype (HC-AM1m) is missing the left pedipalp, and was collected on gravel near food stands in Ambon Island.

== Etymology ==
The specific epithet "ambonensis" refers to the fact that it is only known present on Ambon Island.
