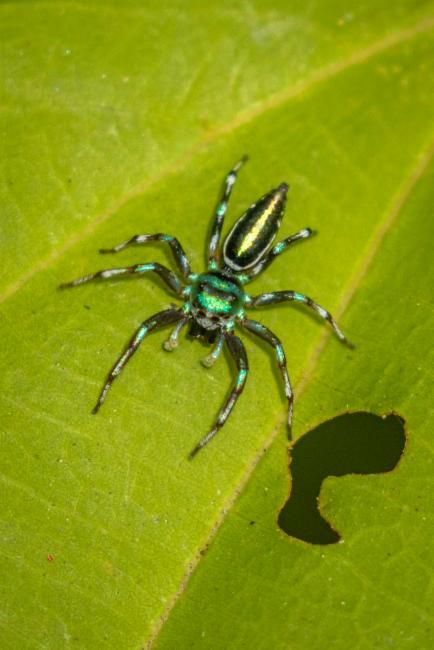

Scientific classification
- Kingdom: Animalia
- Phylum: Arthropoda
- Subphylum: Chelicerata
- Class: Arachnida
- Order: Araneae
- Infraorder: Araneomorphae
- Family: Salticidae
- Genus: Cosmophasis
- Species: C. micans

Binomial name
- Cosmophasis micans (L.Koch, 1880)

Synonyms
- Amycus micans L. Koch, 1880

= Cosmophasis micans =

Species of spider

Cosmophasis micans, or the peacock jumping spider, or the green ant-mimicking jumping spider, is a species of jumping spider in the family Salticidae. It was first described as Amycus micans by L. Koch in 1880, and transferred to the genus Cosmophasis by Eugène Simon in 1901. It is indigenous to northern Queensland and the Torres Strait Islands.
