= Francis Kean =

Fijian former military officer and convicted killer

Francis Frederick Kean (born 1966 or 1967 (age 58–59) ) is a former Fijian military officer, public servant, sports administrator, and convicted killer. In 2007, when he was serving as Commander of the Republic of Fiji Navy he was charged with murder. He was ultimately convicted of manslaughter, but served only six months of an 18 month sentence. Kean is the brother-in-law of former Fijian dictator Frank Bainimarama.

== Murder charge ==
Kean was arrested on 6 January 2007 and charged with the murder of salesman John Whippy at the Royal Suva Yacht Club, after a wedding reception for Whippy's nephew Samuel Whippy and his bride, Ateca Bainimarama, the Prime Minister's daughter, on 31 December 2006. Kean had punched and kicked John Whippy following the latter's drunken insults against him. The attack resulted in Whippy's death.

On 19 January 2007 he was charged with murder and remanded in custody at Korovou Prison. Kean's second-in-command, Lieutenant Commander James Fisher, was named on 22 January to act in his stead. On 25 January 2007 he was granted bail. In a subsequent court appearance on 30 March 2007 he pleaded not guilty to murder. In October 2007 the judge presiding over the case, Gerard Winter, accused police commissioner Esala Teleni of attempting to pervert the course of justice by attempting to interfere in the case.

On 18 October 2007 Kean plead guilty to a charge of manslaughter and was convicted. He was subsequently sentenced to 18 months imprisonment. Despite his conviction he retained his position as navy commander and continued on full pay. He was released from prison after serving six months of his sentence.

== Post-conviction ==
In January 2009 Kean was reappointed as navy commander. Bainimarama denied that the appointment was nepotism.

In August 2011 he was appointed as acting permanent secretary of public works by the military regime.

In 2015 he was appointed chair of the Fiji Rugby Union. In April 2020 he was nominated to the board of World Rugby. He withdrew his nomination shortly afterwards following allegations of homophobia. He stood down as FRU chair in July 2020.

In March 2016 he was appointed corrections commissioner. As corrections commissioner, he publicly advocated corporal punishment for violent crimes. In 2020 four prison officers accused Kean of routinely ordering the beating and mistreatment of prisoners. In July 2020 Kean was criticised for allowing a convicted rapist leave from prison to train and play with a rugby club he headed.

On 27 January 2023 the Constitutional Offices Commission suspended him from his position as corrections commissioner. On 3 march 2023 he resigned as Corrections Commissioner.
