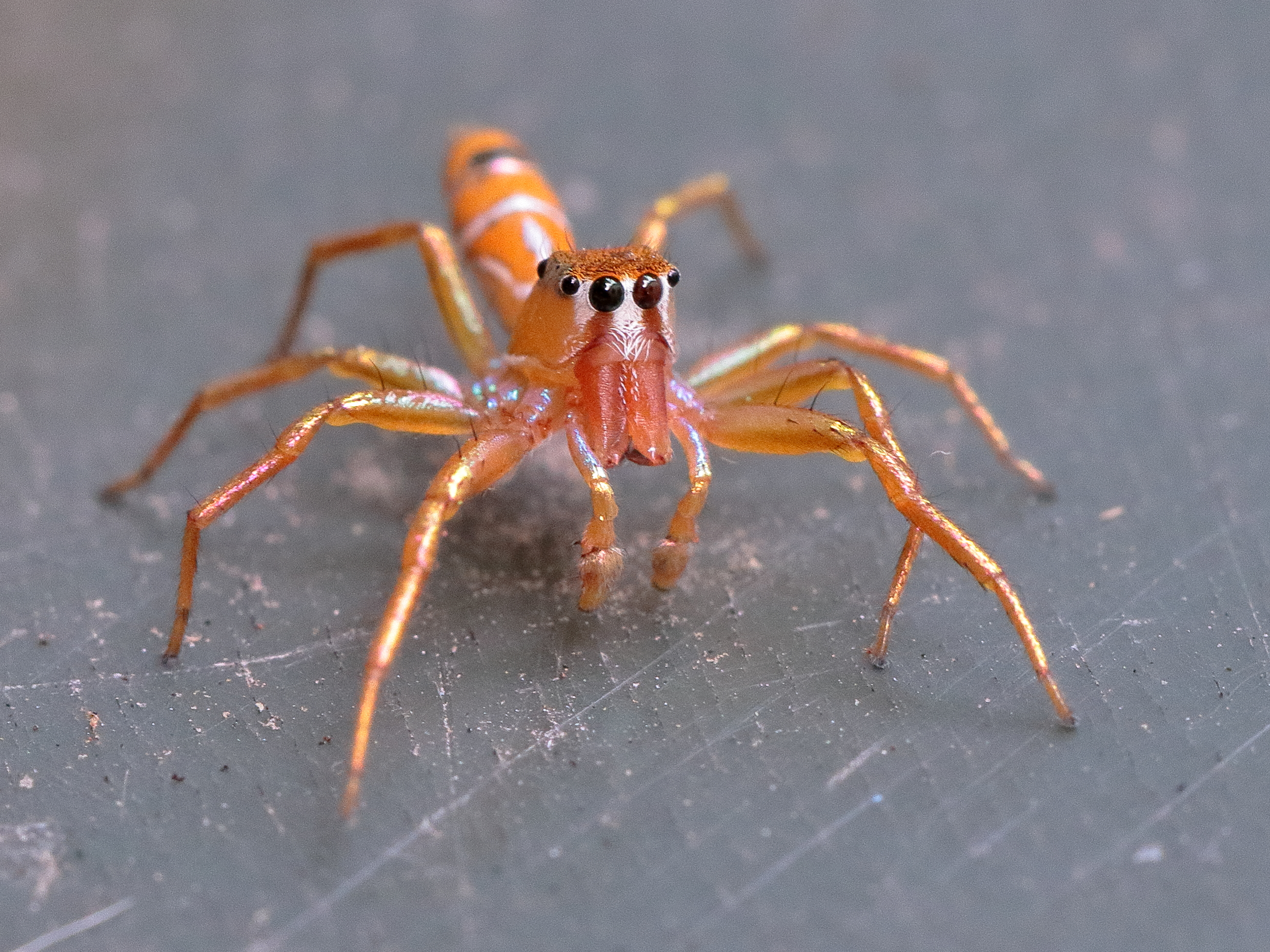
- Cairns, Queensland

Scientific classification
- Kingdom: Animalia
- Phylum: Arthropoda
- Subphylum: Chelicerata
- Class: Arachnida
- Order: Araneae
- Infraorder: Araneomorphae
- Family: Salticidae
- Genus: Cosmophasis
- Species: C. bitaeniata

Binomial name
- Cosmophasis bitaeniata (Keyserling, 1882)

Synonyms
- Sobara bitaeniata Keyserling, 1882; Selaophora rubra Keyserling, 1882; Cosmophasis rubra (Keyserling, 1882)

= Cosmophasis bitaeniata =

Species of spider

Cosmophasis bitaeniata is a species of jumping spider found in Indonesia, Papua New Guinea, Australia, Micronesia, and Fiji. The common name is green ant hunter as it preys on the larvae of green tree ants (Oecophylla smaragdina).

== Description ==
Cosmophasis bitaeniata have a reflective metallic-like sheen of yellow-gold on most of their body and legs, the colour of which varies with the ambient light. Narrow stripes of silver outlined with black are on the carapace and abdomen. The female and male look very much alike and have a body length of 6 mm (0.24 in), with the male being slightly smaller and narrower in the abdomen.

== Gallery ==
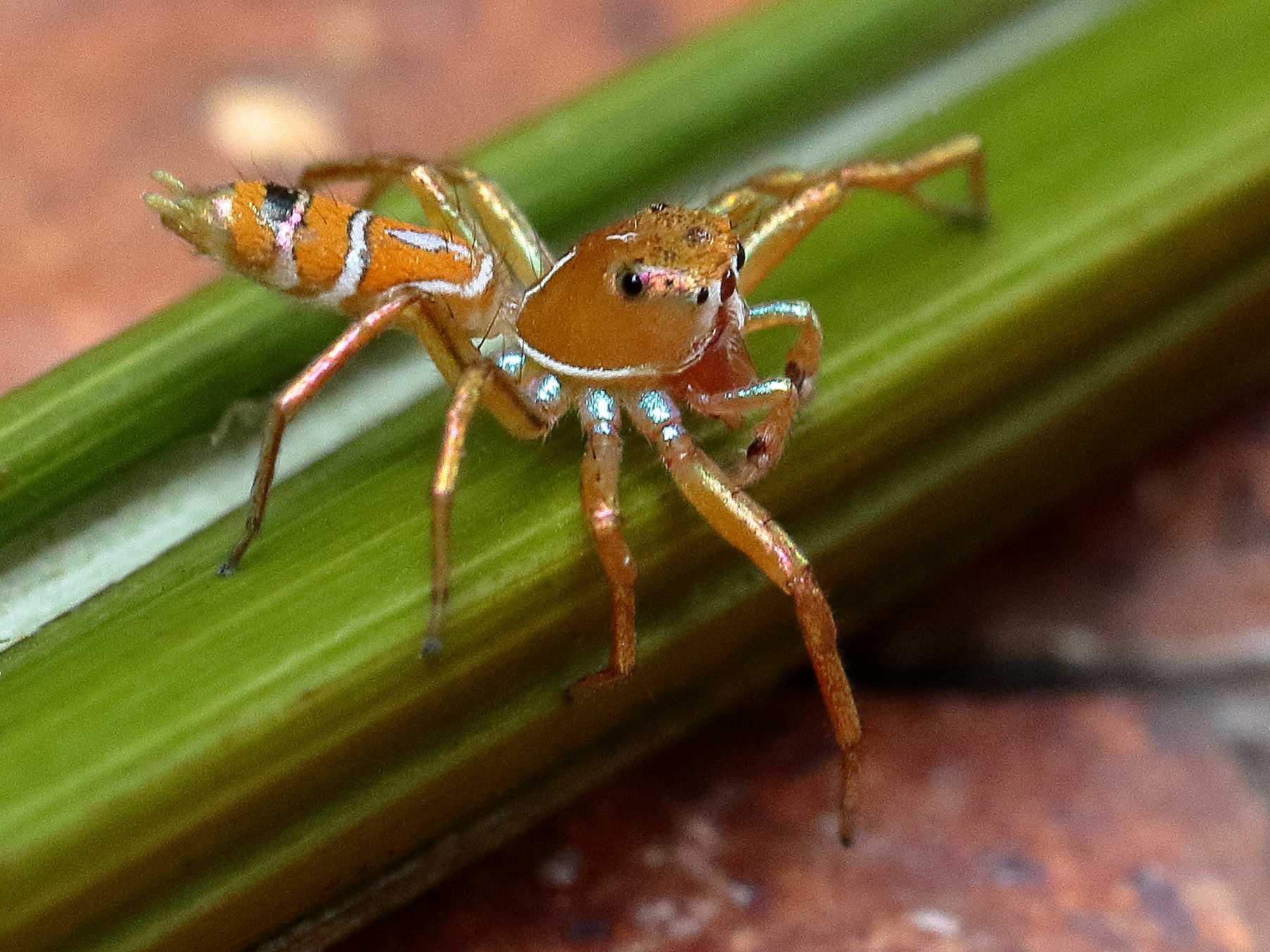
Green ant hunter, north Queensland

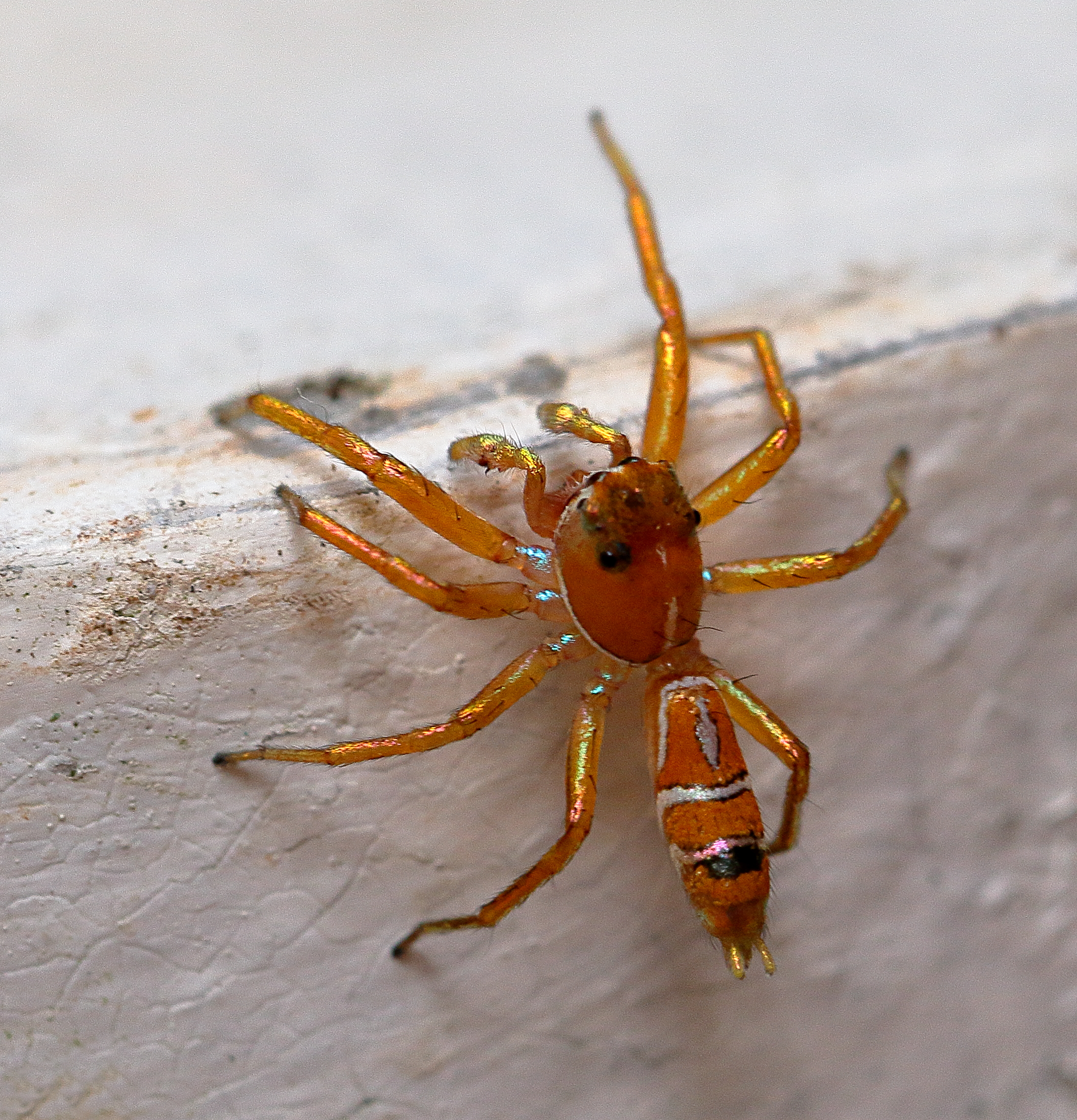
View from above

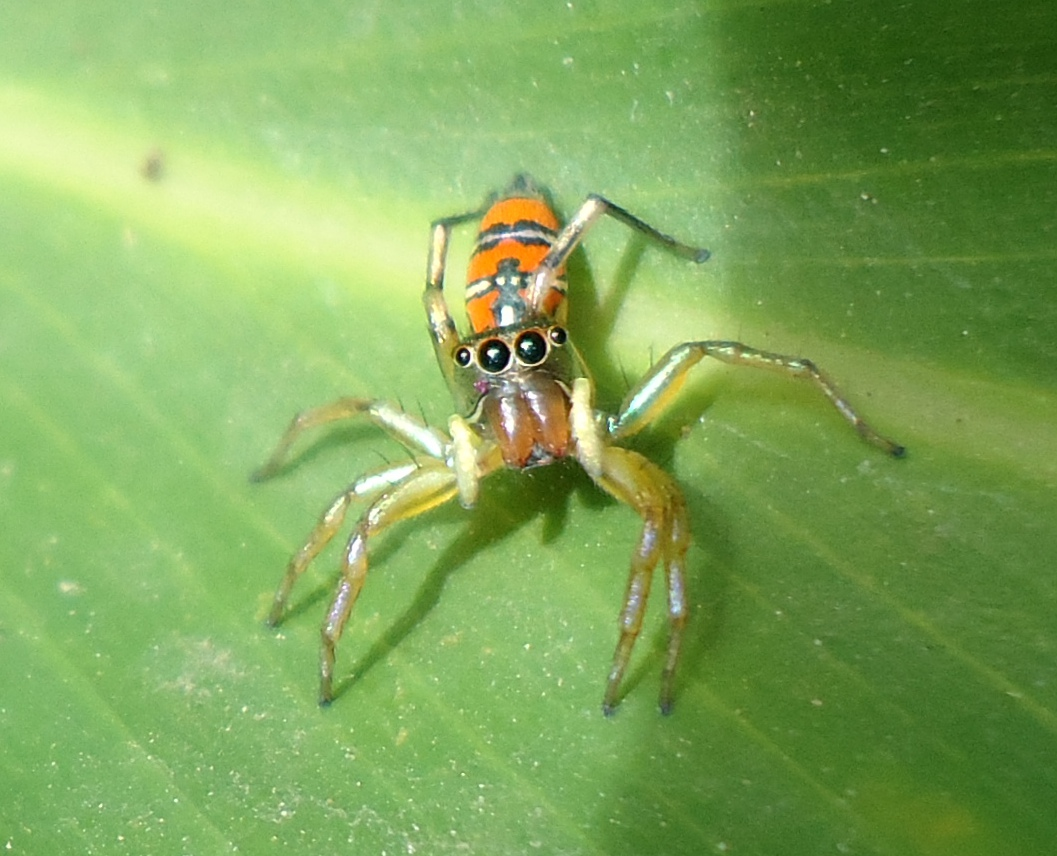
Face on, Philippines
