= Lami, Fiji =

Urban area in Rewa Province, Fiji

Lami लमी (Hindi)
- Town
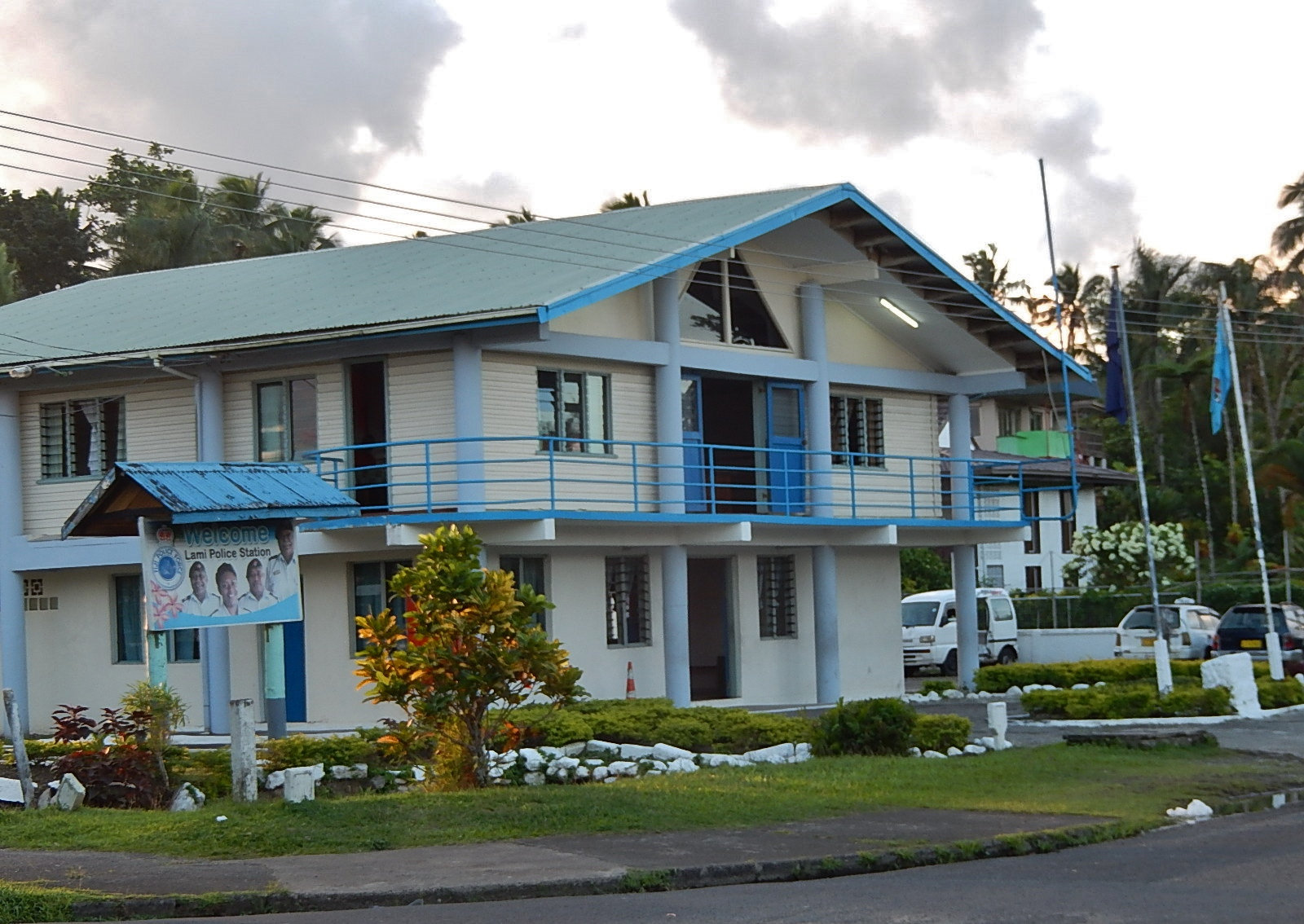
- Police Station, Lami, Fiji

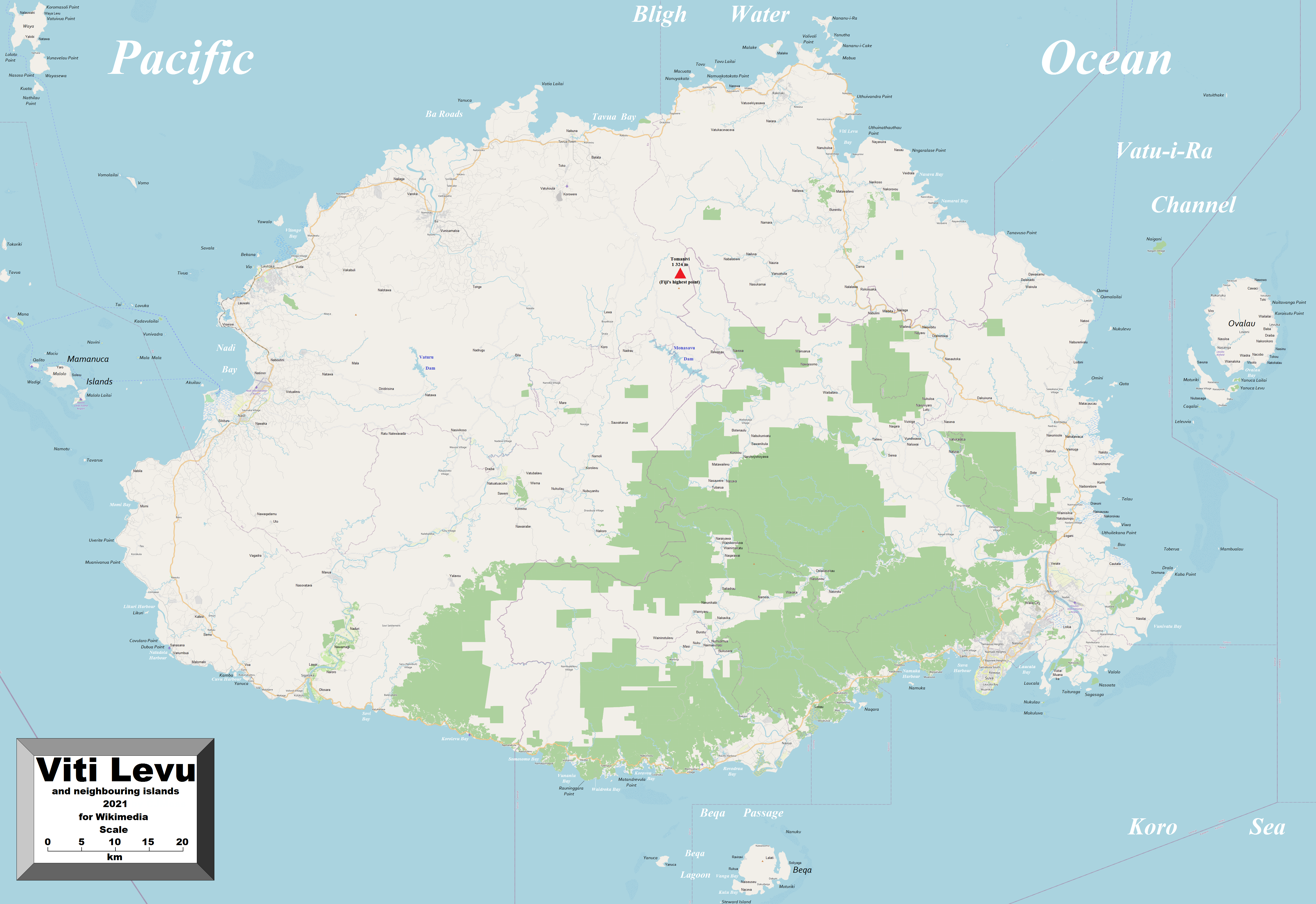
- Viti Levu with Lami in the south, near Suva

- Location in Fiji
- Country: Fiji
- Island: Viti Levu
- Division: Central Division
- Province: Rewa
- Town: 1977

Population (2017)
  - Total: 20,217
- Time zone: UTC+12

Lami (Fijian pronunciation: [lami]) is an urban area in Rewa Province, Fiji, north-west of the capital Suva. It was formally incorporated as a town in 1977, and had a population of 20,529 at the most recent census in 2007. The municipal boundaries enclose an area of 683 square kilometers.

The original itaukei inhabitants of Suva were forced to move to Suvavou ("New Suva") by the British colonial powers in 1882 to make room for the new capital of Suva.

Located on the outskirts of Lami is the Bilo Battery, which was a key defense fortification built during World War II to help guard the main passage in the reef leading into Suva.

Lami is governed by a town council of 12 members, elected for three-year terms, who elect a mayor from among themselves. The mayor's term is one year, but may be extended indefinitely. In the last municipal election, held on 22 October 2005, the Soqosoqo Duavata ni Lewenivanua (SDL) won 11 of the 12 seats, ending 20 years of rule by the Ratepayers Association. The new council chose Tevita Vuatalevu as its mayor.

Following the military coup of 2006, the dictatorial regime dismissed all local government authorities. Marica Rokovada-Hallacy was appointed Administrator of Lami, as well as the nearby capital city of Suva. In 2010, she was replaced in both capacities by Chandu Umaria, a former Mayor of Suva.

== Biology ==
Cosmophasis lami's common name is Lami Beach Northern Jumping Spider.
