= Krishna Datt =

Fijian politician

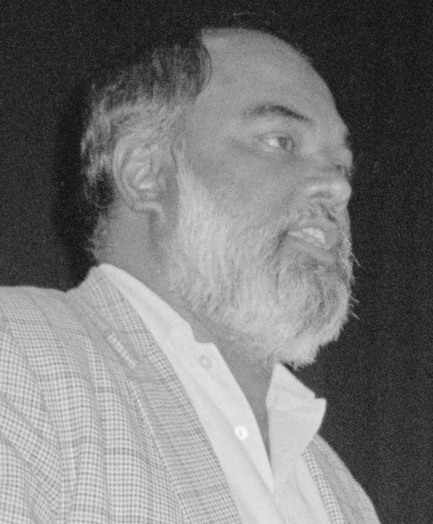
- Datt in 1988

Member of House of Representatives (Fiji)
- In office 1987–1987

Minister for Foreign Affairs and Civil Aviation (Fiji)
- In office 1987–1987

Member of House of Representatives (Fiji)
- In office 1994–2006

Minister for Labour and Employment Opportunities
- In office 2006–2006

Personal details
- Party: Fiji Labour Party
- Profession: Teacher, Trade Unionist

Krishna Datt, last name sometimes spelt as Dutt, is a Fijian politician of Indian descent. Datt served as Principal of Suva Grammar School, where he participated in the national teachers' strikes in 1985, which launched his political career with the Fiji Labour Party.

Datt was first elected into the House of Representatives in 1987 and was the Minister for Foreign Affairs and Civil Aviation in the Bavadra Government before being deposed by the coup of 1987. He also contested and won the Ba Rural Indian Constituency in the 1994 election.

After the present constitutional arrangements came into force in 1999, he represented the Macuata East Open Constituency, one of 25 elected by universal suffrage. He became a member of the Chaudhry government, which was deposed in the 2000 coup. He was re-elected in the 2001 election with an increased majority and held the positions of the Vice-President of the Fiji Labour Party, and its parliamentary whip.

In 2003, Datt was offered the portfolio of Minister for Special Education, the Disabled and National Library Services, together with 13 other FLP parliamentarians who were offered cabinet positions by the Prime Minister, Laisenia Qarase but the FLP refused to accept this offer.

On 12 December 2005, Datt announced that he would retire from politics at the parliamentary election scheduled for 2006, but on 14 March 2006, said that he had changed his mind at the request of his party. In the election duly held on 6–13 May, he won the Nasinu Indian Communal Constituency with an overwhelming majority, and was subsequently appointed to the Cabinet as Minister for Labour and Employment Opportunities, one of nine Ministers from the FLP in Laisenia Qarase's multi-party cabinet. According to Vijay Naidu, he "quickly gain[ed] the image of a national statesman".

The FLP members of the Cabinet were advised by its leader, Mahendra Chaudhry, to vote against the 2007 budget but Datt was absent during voting. Chaudhry threatened those not voting against the budget with disciplinary action, and there was a public feud between him and his party leader, Mahendra Chaudhry but the 2006 coup took place before any action could be taken. As Vijay Naidu notes, Datt was in the unusual position of having been removed from government by a coup on three separate occasions.
