= Pratap Chand =

Fijian politician

Member of House of Representatives of Fiji Nasinu Indian Communal Constituency
- In office 1999–2006
- Succeeded by: Krishna Datt

Minister of Education (Fiji)
- In office 1999–2000

Personal details
- Party: Fiji Labour Party
- Profession: Teacher, Trade Unionist

Pratap Chand is a former Fijian politician of Indian descent. In the House of Representatives he represented the Nasinu Indian Communal Constituency from 1999 to 2006. He held the seat, one of 19 reserved for Indo-Fijians, for the Fiji Labour Party (FLP) in the general elections of 1999 and 2001.

Pratap Chand was noted for his contribution to education in Fiji. He was a long-time primary and secondary school teacher and a secondary school principal. He served the Fiji Teachers Union in a range of positions becoming its General Secretary in 1980, and holding the post until 1999 when he was elected to the House of Representatives. He has served as the Assistant National Secretary and as the National Secretary of the Fiji Trades Union Congress.

After the 1999 election, he was appointed the Minister of Education. He escaped being taken hostage during the 2000 coup because he was on a visit to Australia.

In 2003, Chand was offered the portfolio of Minister of National Reconciliation and Unity, together with 13 other FLP parliamentarians who were offered cabinet positions by the Prime Minister, Laisenia Qarase but the FLP refused to accept this offer.

In early March 2006, Chand announced his decision to retire at the parliamentary election scheduled for 6–13 May. The Fiji Times reported on 11 March that his wife was seriously ill in Australia, but party leader Mahendra Chaudhry said that it was still possible that Chand would contest the election for the FLP. In the end, he did not.

He was appointed to the Council of the newly established University of Fiji.
