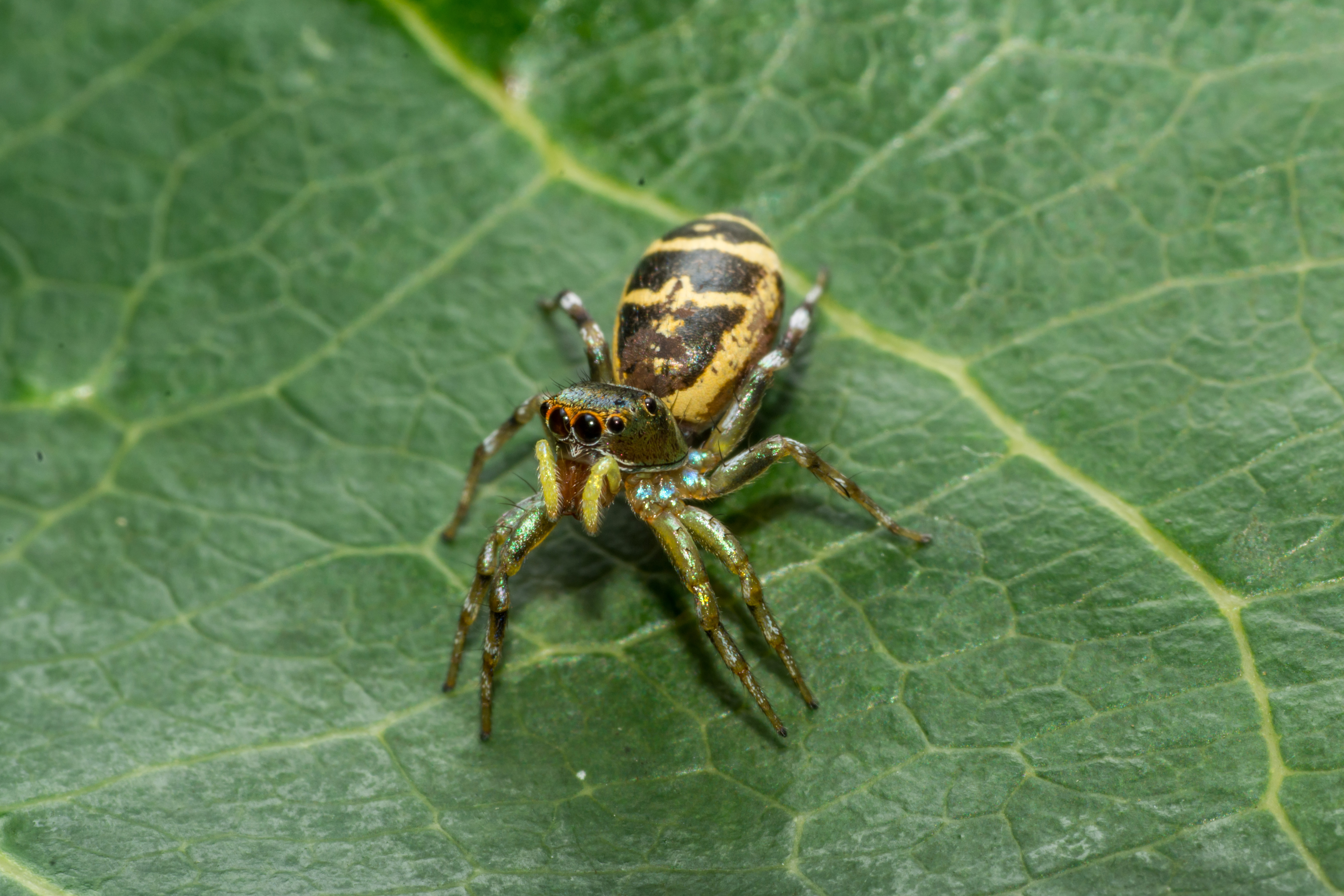
- Female from Banda, Indonesia

Scientific classification
- Kingdom: Animalia
- Phylum: Arthropoda
- Subphylum: Chelicerata
- Class: Arachnida
- Order: Araneae
- Infraorder: Araneomorphae
- Family: Salticidae
- Genus: Cosmophasis
- Species: C. squamata

Binomial name
- Cosmophasis squamata Kulczynski, 1910

= Cosmophasis squamata =

Species of arachnid

Cosmophasis squamata is a species of jumping spider in the family Salticidae, native to the Solomon Islands and Seychelles. It was described by Władysław Kulczyński in 1910.

== Description ==
The holotype of this species is a female and the mature male is undescribed, although a premature male has been spotted. It is possible that Cosmophasis bandaneira might be the male.
