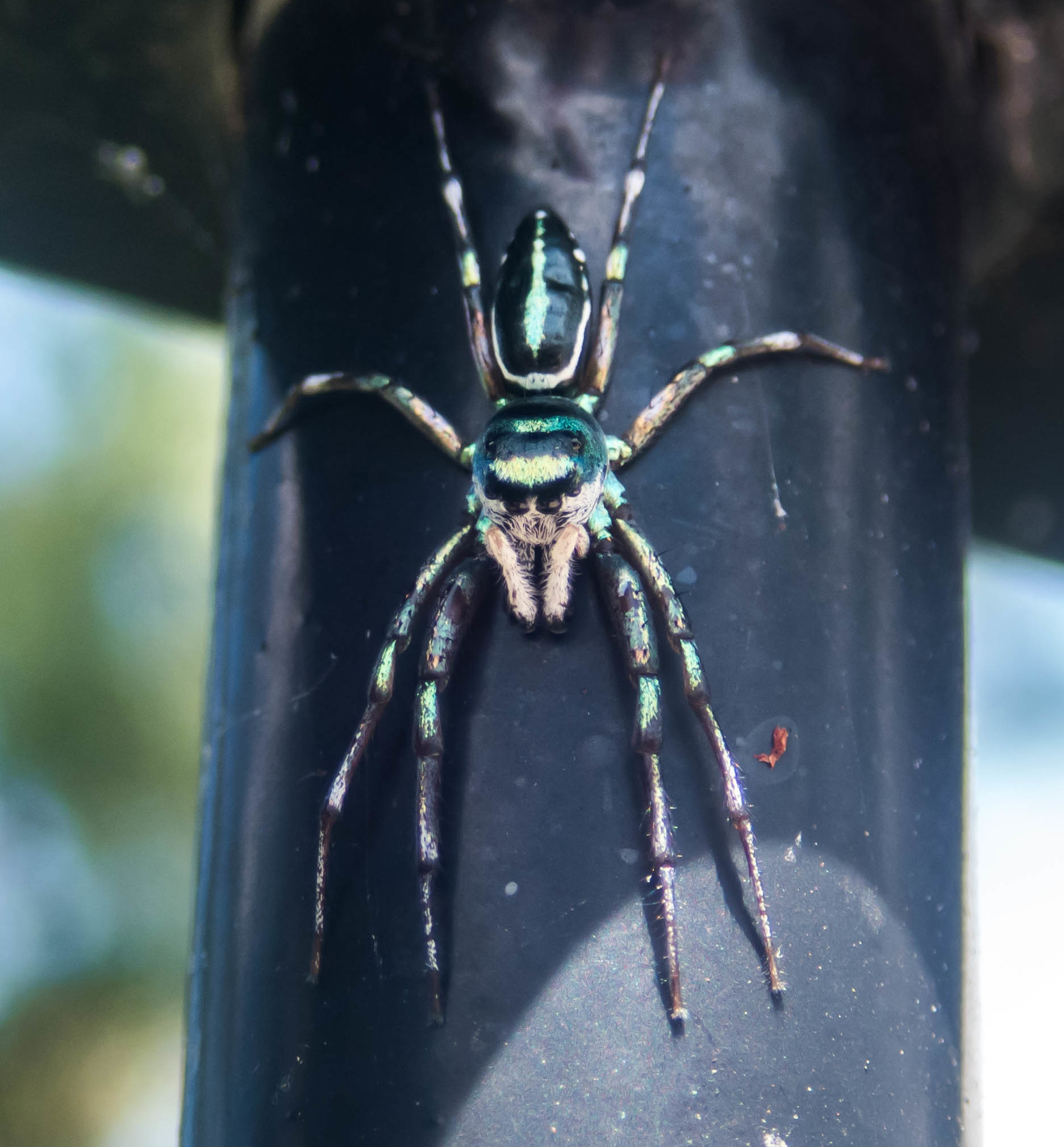
- male from Brisbane, Australia
- 1846 drawing of female

Scientific classification
- Kingdom: Animalia
- Phylum: Arthropoda
- Subphylum: Chelicerata
- Class: Arachnida
- Order: Araneae
- Infraorder: Araneomorphae
- Family: Salticidae
- Genus: Cosmophasis
- Species: C. thalassina

Binomial name
- Cosmophasis thalassina (C. L. Koch, 1846)

Synonyms
- Plexippus thalassinus Thiania thalassina Amycus splendidus Amycus tristriatus Maevia thalassina Cosmophasis splendens

= Cosmophasis thalassina =

Sea-green Northern Jumper

Species of spider

Cosmophasis thalassina is a species of jumping spider found from Malaysia to Australia. It was probably dispersed to the gardens and the parks of Queensland by man.

== Description ==
The carapace is covered with greenish-bronze and squamose copper hairs, with some black transverse bands. The opisthosoma is mostly dark, with a white collar at the front that continues beyond halfway along each side. Some transverse white marks can be seen in the frontal part. The dark legs bear white and bronze squamose hairs.

The metallic color has been found to be a combination of a first-order diffraction grating and an underlying broadband multilayer reflector. The grating directs mostly the blue spectral component away from the incoming direction, which, together with the white reflection, results in a yellow reflection from most angles. It feeds on ants.
