= Massagris mohale =

Scientific classification
- Kingdom: Animalia
- Phylum: Arthropoda
- Subphylum: Chelicerata
- Class: Arachnida
- Order: Araneae
- Infraorder: Araneomorphae
- Family: Salticidae
- Genus: Massagris
- Species: M. mohale

Binomial name
- Massagris mohale Wesołowska & Haddad, 2014

Species of jumping spider

Massagris mohale is a species of jumping spider that ilves in Leotho. A member of the genus Massagris, the spider is small, with a cephalothorax between 2.1 and 2.4 mm (0.083 and 0.094 in) long and an abdomen between 1.8 and 4 mm (0.071 and 0.157 in) long. It is generally brown with a distinctive pattern of a yellow serrated stripe on its abdomen. The female is lighter than the male with a yellow pattern on its brown carapace and a yellow rather than brown sternum and legs. The spider has distinctive copulatory organs. The male has a long embolus that forms three coils that sit on top of the palpal bulb and the female has a depression to the back of its epigyne, the external part of its copulatory organs, and two copulatory openings to the front. The spider was first described in 2014 and is named for the Mohale Dam where it was first found.

== Taxonomy and etymology ==
Massagris mohale is a jumping spider, a member of the family Salticidae, that was first described by the arachnologists Wanda Wesołowska and Charles Haddad in 2014. It was one of more than 500 species that Wesołowska identified in her career. They allocated the species to the genus Massagris, first raised by Eugène Simon in 1900. It is named for the place where it was first found.

The genus Massagris is recognised as separate from the clade Salticoida and a member of the subfamily Hisponinae. It is the only subfamily that is recognised in Baltic Amber. It was recognised as a distinctive subfamily by Wayne Maddison in 2015. Phylogenetics has shown that the genus is related to Tomocyrba. In 2016, Jerzy Prószyński allocated the genus to a group of genera called Hisponines. Named for the related genus Hispo, the group is identified by its eyes.

== Description ==
Massagris mohale is a small spider with body that consists of a patterned cephalothorax and an abdomen. The male cephalothorax is between 2.1 and 2.4 mm (0.083 and 0.094 in) long and between 1.4 and 1.5 mm (0.055 and 0.059 in) wide. The brown carapace, the hard upper part of the cephalothorax, is moderately high with a gently sloping rear portion and a long fovea. It is brown with white hairs on its slopes. It has a large eye field, its eyes being mounted on well-developed tubercles. Black rings and long brown bristles surround its eyes. The underside of the spider's cephalothorax, or sternum, is brown. The spider has a low brown clypeus that has a scattering of white hairs on it. Its chelicerae are similar to Massagris maculosa, with five small teeth towards the front and a large plate-shaped tooth to the rear. The remainder of the mouthparts, the labium and maxillae, are brown with light tips at the edge of its maxillae.

The male spider's abdomen is between 1.8 and 1.9 mm (0.071 and 0.075 in) long and between 1.2 and 1.3 mm (0.047 and 0.051 in) wide. It is a brown oval, marked with pattern composed of a yellow serrated stripe that runs from the front to the back, and covered in colourless hairs that are denser and longer near the edges. The underside of its abdomen is blackish. The spider's spinnerets are brownish and its legs are mainly light brown with colourless leg hairs. Its front legs are longer than all the others. Its pedipalps are relatively large and brown. The spider's palpal bulb is short, broad and lumpy and has a wide tegulum that has bulges coming out of the side. A long and wide embolus projects from the top of the palpal bulb, forming three coils before it forms a tape-like ending that can be seen beyond the remainder of its copulatory organs. There is a single very long and slightly curved projection on the palpal tibia, or tibial apophysis. The larger size of its embolus helps distinguish the spider from the otherwise similar Massagris maculosa.

The female is similar to the male. It is approximately the same size, with a carapace measuring between 2.1 and 2.2 mm (0.087 in) long and between 1.4 and 1.6 mm (0.063 in) wide. Its abdomen is substantially bigger, between 2.4 and 4 mm (0.094 and 0.157 in) long and between 1.6 and 2.2 wide. It is generally lighter than the male with a yellow streak and yellow sides to its brown carapace and a yellow sternum. Its mouthparts are yellow and there are three teeth to the front of its chelicerae and five small teeth It has a greyish-brown background to its abdomen, which again has a pattern of a yellow serrated stripe, but has other patches too. The underside of its abdomen is dark but is marked with three faint lighter lines. Its legs are yellow.

As with the male, the female's copulatory organs are distinctive. Its epigyne, the external part of its copulatory organs, is broad and shows evidence of weak sclerotization. It has a large shallow depression to the back and two copulatory openings are found to the front of the epigyne. The openings lead via very long narrow and looping insemination ducts to narrow spermathecae, or receptacles. It is similar to the related Massagris contortuplicata, although it can be identified by the way that its copulatory openings are situated at the front rather than the back of its epigyne.

== Distribution ==
Massagris spiders can be found across Afro-Eurasia and the Eastern hemisphere, but mainly live in Africa. Massagris mohale is endemic to Lesotho. The holotype was found near the Mohale Dam, at an altitude of 2,060 m (6,760 ft) above sea level. The spider is known across central and south-eastern Lesotho.
