= Massagris maculosa =

Scientific classification
- Kingdom: Animalia
- Phylum: Arthropoda
- Subphylum: Chelicerata
- Class: Arachnida
- Order: Araneae
- Infraorder: Araneomorphae
- Family: Salticidae
- Genus: Massagris
- Species: M. maculosa

Binomial name
- Massagris maculosa Wesołowska & Haddad, 2018

Species of jumping spider

Massagris maculosa is a species of jumping spider in the genus Massagris that ilves in South Africa. The spider is small, with a cephalothorax between 1.7 and 1.8 mm (0.067 and 0.071 in) long and an abdomen between 1.5 mm (0.059 in) and 1.7 mm long. It is generally creamy with a distinctive pattern of dark dots and spots on the abdomen. The male carapace is brown and sternum is yellow and brown. The female's legs are whitish and the male's brownish. It has a silvery eye field formed of translucent guanine crystals marked with darker patches. The male has a single very long, pointed and slightly curved projection on the palpal tibia known as a tibial apophysis. There are distinctive hoods on the female's epigyne that help distinguish the species from others in the genus. The spider was first described in 2018 by the arachnologists Wanda Wesołowska and Charles Haddad.

== Taxonomy ==
Massagris maculosa is a jumping spider, a member of the family Salticidae, that was first described by the arachnologists Wanda Wesołowska and Charles Haddad in 2018. It was one of more than 500 species that Wesołowska identified in her career. They allocated the species to the genus Massagris, first raised by Eugène Simon in 1900. The species name is derived from a Latin word that can be translated "spotted" and relates to the distinctive pattern on its abdomen.

The genus Massagris is recognised as separate from the clade Salticoida and a member of the subfamily Hisponinae. It is the only subfamily that is recognised in Baltic Amber. It was recognised as a distinctive subfamily by Wayne Maddison in 2015. Phylogenetics has shown that the genus is related to Tomocyrba. In 2016, Jerzy Prószyński allocated the genus to a group of genera called Hisponines. Named for the related genus Hispo, the group is identified by its eyes.

== Description ==
Massagris maculosa is a small spider with body that consists of a patterned cephalothorax and an abdomen. It has a shape that is typical for the genus. The male cephalothorax is typicailly 1.8 mm (0.071 in) long and 1.3 mm (0.051 in) wide. The carapace, the hard upper part of the cephalothorax, is pear-shaped and moderately high. It is brown with white hairs on its slopes. It has a silvery eye field formed of translucent guanine crystals marked with two rounded black spots in the middle. There are long brown bristles around the eyes themselves. The eyes are mounted on well-developed tubercles. The underside of the cephalothorax, or sternum, is yellow in the middle and brown to the sides. The spider has a low brown clypeus that has a scattering of white hairs on it. Its chelicerae are similar to Massagris mohale, with five small teeth towards the front and a large plate-shaped tooth to the rear. The remainder of the mouthparts, the labium and maxillae are brownish with light tips.

The male spider's abdomen is typically 1.7 mm (0.067 in) long and 1.3 mm wide. It is a creamy-white ovoid, marked with pattern composed of dark dots and spots on both the top and bottom. The spider's spinnerets are dark and its legs are brownish with brown and greyish leg hairs. Its pedipalps are large and dark brown. The spider's cymbium is large and smooth. The palpal bulb is lumpy and has a wide and short tegulum that has a small triangular projection coming out of the side. A broad embolus projects from the top of the palpal bulb, coiled inside the distal haematodocha. There is a single very long, pointed and slightly curved projection on the palpal tibia, or tibial apophysis. There are white scales on the palpal tibia itself.

The female is similar to the male. It is approximately the same size, with a carapace measuring typically 1.7 mm long and abdomen typically 1.5 mm (0.059 in) long, both being slightly narrower at 1.2 mm (0.047 in) wide. It is generally lighter than the male. Its carapace is creamy and marked by brown patches. The spider's eye field is covered in translucent guanine crystals and dark areas are found near the eyes. The abdomen has a similar pattern to the male. Its legs are whitish with dark markings on them.

The spider's copulatory organs are unusual. Its epigyne, the external part of its copulatory organs, is broad and shows evidence of weak sclerotization. It has a large shallow depression in the middle. Two copulatory openings are found to the front of the epigyne that lead to initially broad insemination ducts. The ducts then become long and thin, leading via a looping route to elongated spermathecae, or receptacles. There are large accessory glands. The insemination ducts are more complex than the otherwise similar Massagris budongo. There are distinctive hoods on the epigyne that help distinguish the species from others in the genus.

== Distribution and habitat ==
Massagris spiders can be found across Afro-Eurasia and the Eastern hemisphere, but mainly live in Africa. Massagris maculosa is endemic to South Africa. The holotype was found near George in Western Cape during 2015. It is a ground-dwelling spider that has been found in coastal areas.
