= Megaeupoa =

Scientific classification
- Kingdom: Animalia
- Phylum: Arthropoda
- Subphylum: Chelicerata
- Class: Arachnida
- Order: Araneae
- Infraorder: Araneomorphae
- Family: Salticidae
- Subfamily: Eupoinae (?)
- Genus: Megaeupoa; Lin & Li, 2020

Type species
- M. yanfengi Lin & Li, 2020

Species
- Megaeupoa gravelyi (Caleb, 2018); Megaeupoa yanfengi Lin & Li, 2020

Genus of jumping spiders

Megaeupoa is a small genus of Asian jumping spiders first described by Y. J. Lin and S. Q. Li in 2020. It was not explicitly assigned to a position within the Salticidae, but the name Megaeupoa refers to the "evolutionary relationship" of the genus (Megaeupoa means 'large Eupoa'). As of March 2022 it contains only two species: M. gravelyi and M. yanfengi.

== See also ==
- Brettus
- Eupoa
- List of Salticidae genera
