= Papuaneon =

Scientific classification
- Kingdom: Animalia
- Phylum: Arthropoda
- Subphylum: Chelicerata
- Class: Arachnida
- Order: Araneae
- Infraorder: Araneomorphae
- Family: Salticidae
- Subfamily: Salticinae
- Genus: Papuaneon; Maddison, 2016

Type species
- Papuaneon tualapa Maddison, 2016

Genus of spiders

Papuaneon is a genus of spiders in the family Salticidae. It was first described in 2016 by Maddison. It is placed in the tribe Neonini (along with the genus Neon), part of the Salticoida clade of the subfamily Salticinae.

== Species ==
As of June 2022 it contains six species:

- Papuaneon eungella Richardson, 2022 – Australia (Queensland)
- Papuaneon eurobodalla Richardson, 2022 – Australia (New South Wales, Victoria, Tasmania)
- Papuaneon ewingar Richardson, 2022 – Australia (New South Wales)
- Papuaneon tapin Richardson, 2022 – Australia (New South Wales)
- Papuaneon tualapa Maddison, 2016 (type) – Papua New Guinea, Australia (Queensland)
- Papuaneon werrikimbe Richardson, 2022 – Australia (New South Wales)
