= Eupoa prima =

Scientific classification
- Kingdom: Animalia
- Phylum: Arthropoda
- Subphylum: Chelicerata
- Class: Arachnida
- Order: Araneae
- Infraorder: Araneomorphae
- Family: Salticidae
- Genus: Eupoa
- Species: E. prima

Binomial name
- Eupoa prima Żabka, 1985

Species of spider

Eupoa prima is a species of jumping spider from Vietnam. Described in 1985, it was for some time the only described species in the genus Eupoa; however, since 1997 six new species have been reported.

== Description ==
Both sexes are one to two millimeters long. The carapace is grey-brown, lighter in the middle, and the eyes are surrounded black. The male opisthosoma is black-brown with small elongate light transverse patches, the female grey-brown with much larger patches. The legs are yellowish-grey. It resembles the not closely related Neon.
