= Australoneon =

Scientific classification
- Kingdom: Animalia
- Phylum: Arthropoda
- Subphylum: Chelicerata
- Class: Arachnida
- Order: Araneae
- Infraorder: Araneomorphae
- Family: Salticidae
- Genus: Australoneon; Richardson, 2025

Type species
- A. zabkai Richardson, 2025

Species
- 6, see text

Genus of spiders

Australoneon is a genus of spiders in the family Salticidae.

== Distribution ==
Australoneon is endemic to Australia.

== Etymology ==
The genus name is a combination of "Australia" and the related genus Neon.

== Species ==
As of January 2026, this genus includes six species:

- Australoneon christineae Richardson, 2025 – Australia (Victoria, Tasmania)
- Australoneon keyserlingi Richardson, 2025 – Australia (New South Wales, Capital Territory, Victoria, Tasmania)
- Australoneon kochi Richardson, 2025 – Australia (New South Wales, Victoria, Tasmania)
- Australoneon taylori (Richardson, 2013) – Australia (New South Wales, Capital Territory, Victoria)
- Australoneon wanlessi Richardson, 2025 – Australia (New South Wales, Victoria, Tasmania)
- Australoneon zabkai Richardson, 2025 – Australia (Queensland, New South Wales, Capital Territory, Victoria, Tasmania)
