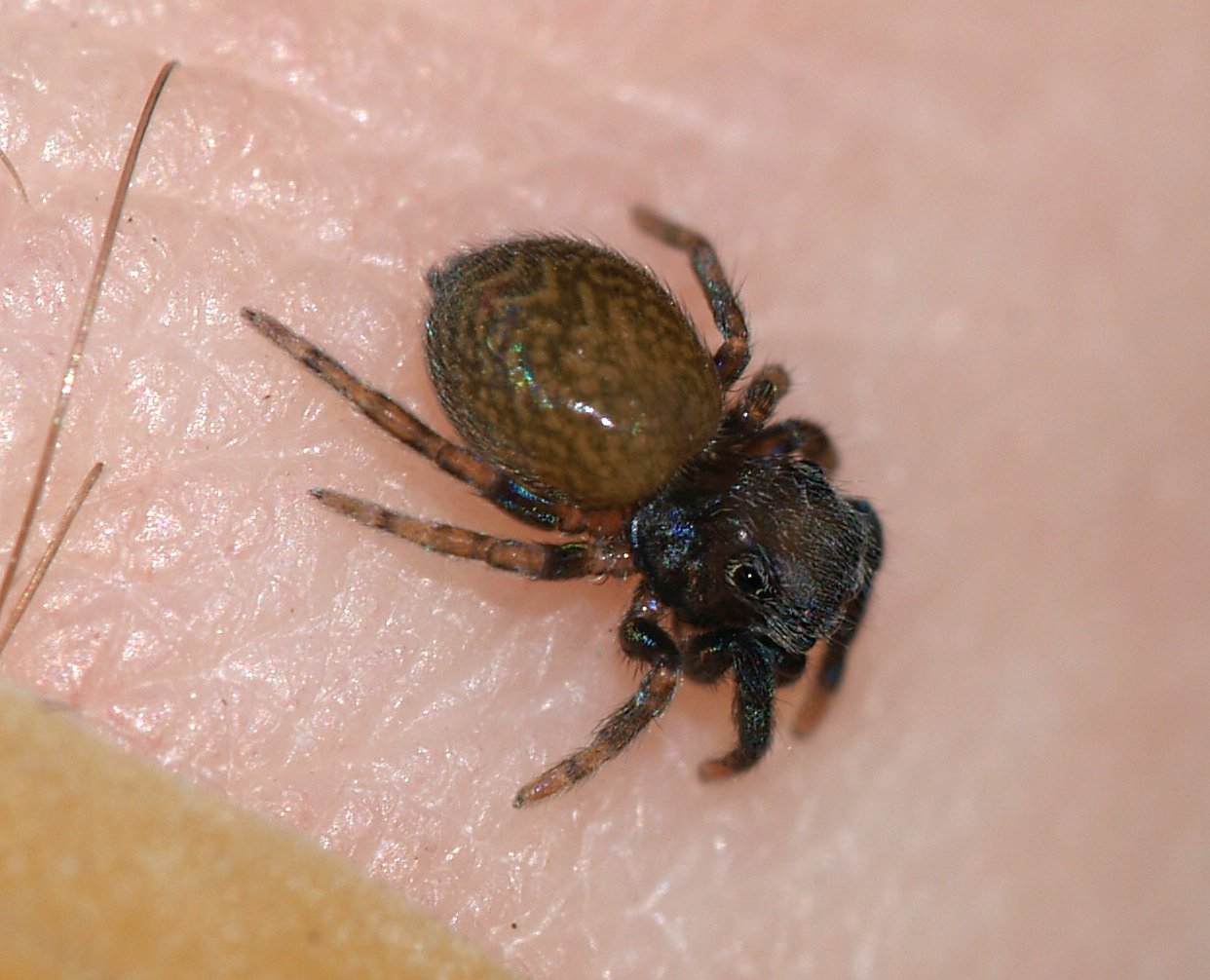

Scientific classification
- Kingdom: Animalia
- Phylum: Arthropoda
- Subphylum: Chelicerata
- Class: Arachnida
- Order: Araneae
- Infraorder: Araneomorphae
- Family: Salticidae
- Genus: Neon
- Species: N. valentulus

Binomial name
- Neon valentulus Falconer, 1912
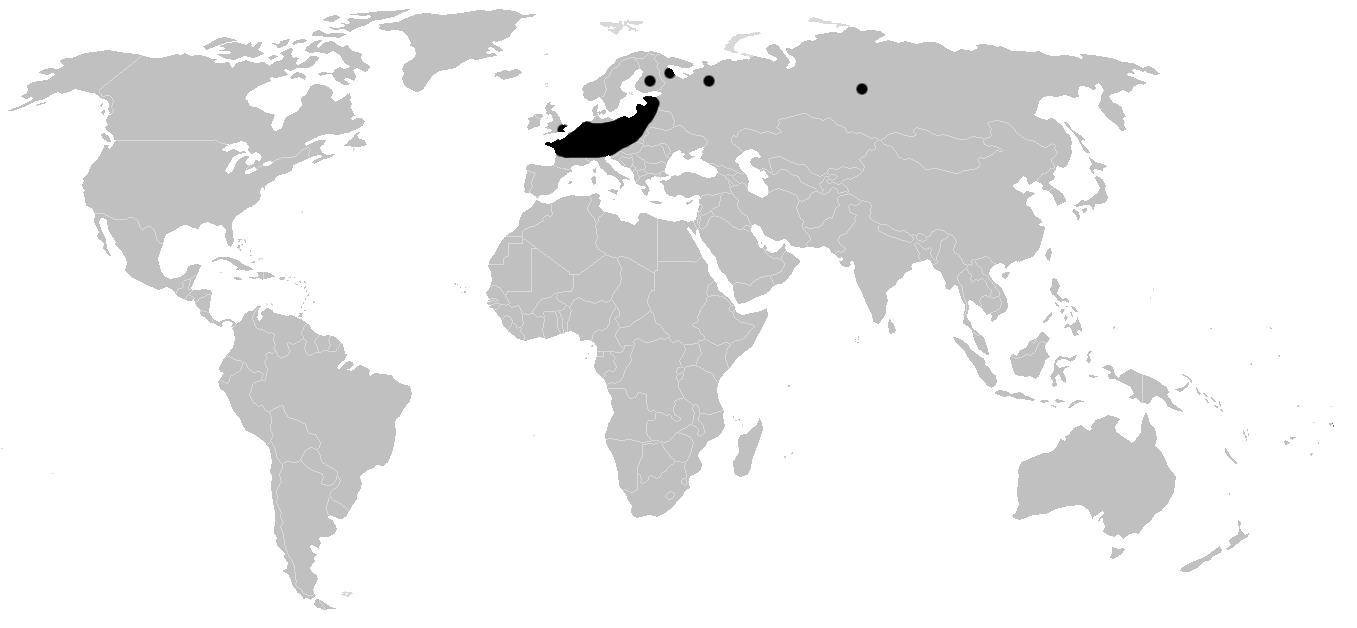

= Neon valentulus =

Species of spider

Neon valentulus is a species of jumping spider found from Europe to Central Asia. It is only found in marshy areas.

Neon valentulus rarely jumps, and has been found living deep within rotten logs.

== Description ==
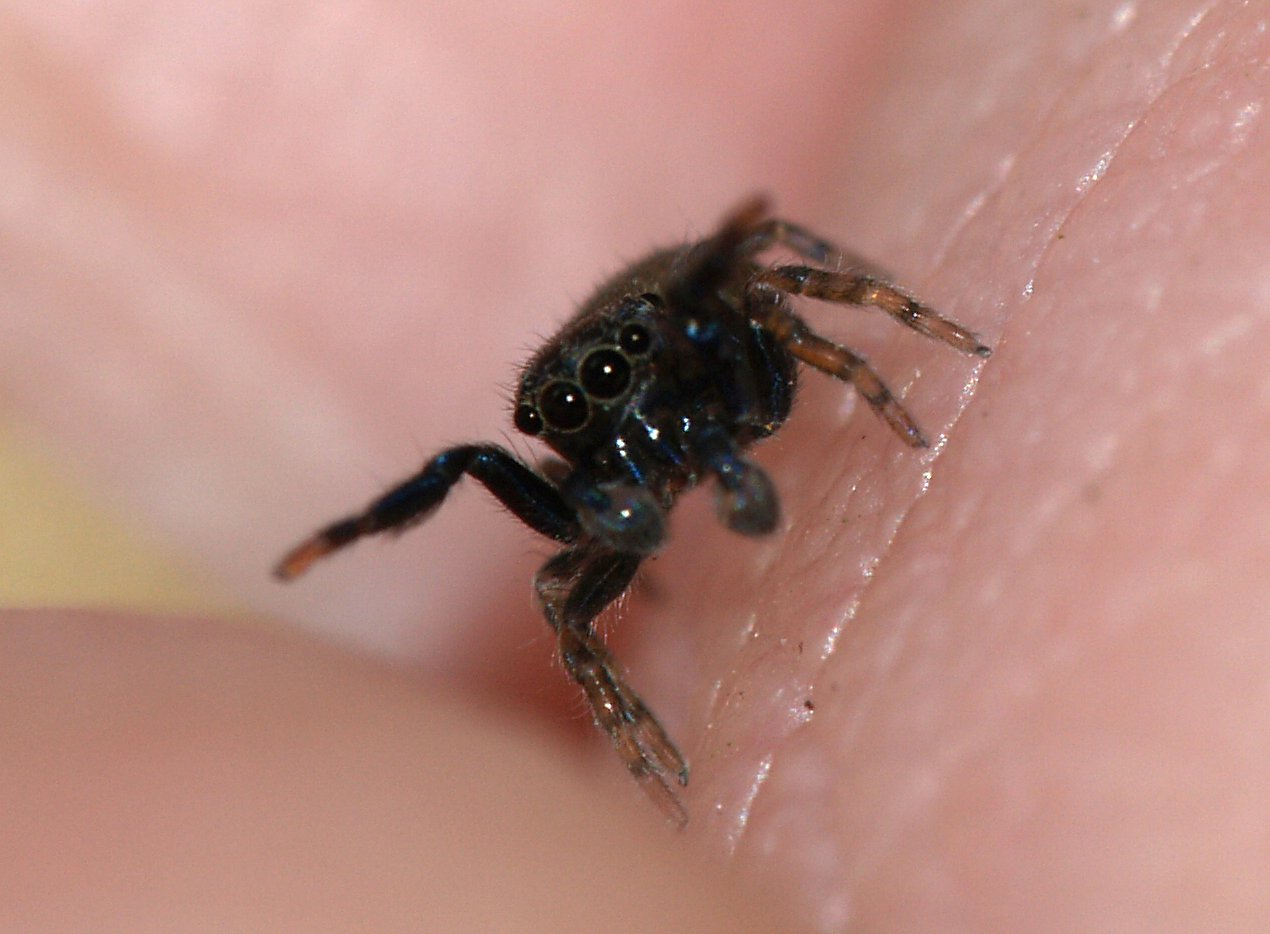
Frontal view of N. valentulus

Females are 2 to 3 mm long, males slightly smaller. The area around the eyes is black. The legs are mostly brown, with black annulations. The frontal pair in both sexes is black with the exception of the coxae and tarsi.

It is very similar to Neon reticulatus, which is slightly lighter and has uniformly light brown legs.

== Name ==
The species name is derived from Latin valentulus "strong".

== Sensitivity to global change ==
Neon valentulus has been predicted to be very sensitive to the upcoming climate and land use changes by modelling approaches. Its environmental suitability was predicted to be severely degraded in the upcoming decades.
