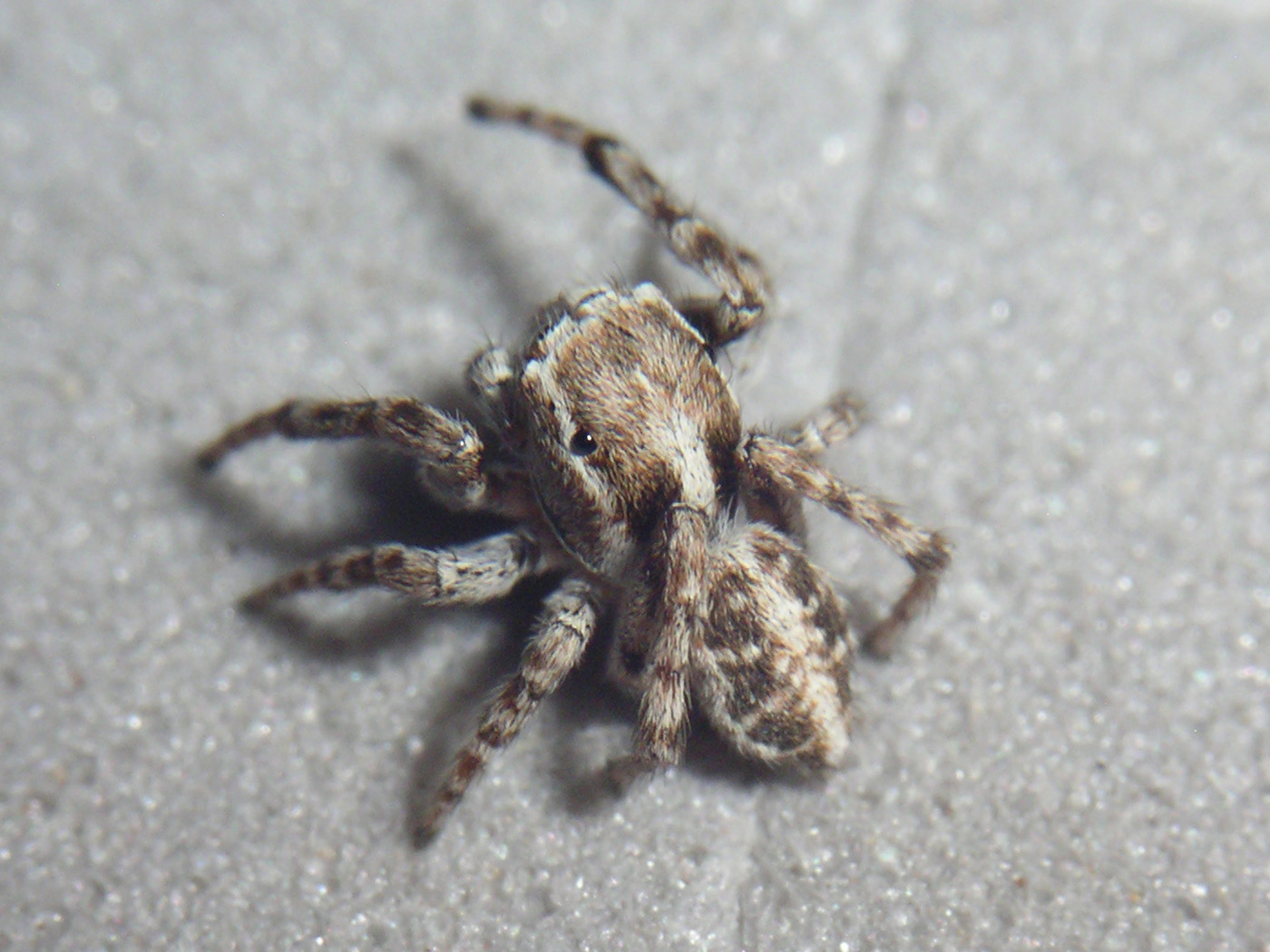
- Male Attulus ammophilus, a member of the tribe Sitticini

Scientific classification
- Kingdom: Animalia
- Phylum: Arthropoda
- Subphylum: Chelicerata
- Class: Arachnida
- Order: Araneae
- Infraorder: Araneomorphae
- Family: Salticidae
- Subfamily: Salticinae
- Clade: Amycoida; Maddison & Hedin, 2003

Tribes
- See text.

= Amycoida =

Clade of spiders

Amycoida is an unranked clade of the jumping spider family Salticidae. It is the smaller and less widespread of the two subdivisions of the "typical" jumping spiders (subfamily Salticinae), occurring mainly in the New World, particularly the Amazon basin. Its sister clade is the Salticoida.

== Definition ==
Amycoida is formally defined as the smallest clade containing Cotinusa, Sitticus, Breda, Sarinda, Synemosyna, and Amycus.

== Subdivisions ==
Amycoida is divided into nine tribes, with about 63 genera (two of which are unplaced in a tribe) and about 430 described species. Many more species are thought to be undescribed as yet. Sitticini has the largest number of species (about 120). It is the only tribe to have reached the Old World, particularly the genus Attulus (formerly Sitticus). Amycini has the next largest number of species (about 110). Amycines are mostly foliage-dwellers. Many are excellent jumpers; Wayne Maddison recorded a 5.2 mm juvenile Hypaeus species jumping 25 cm on a horizontal surface (more than 45 times its body length).
