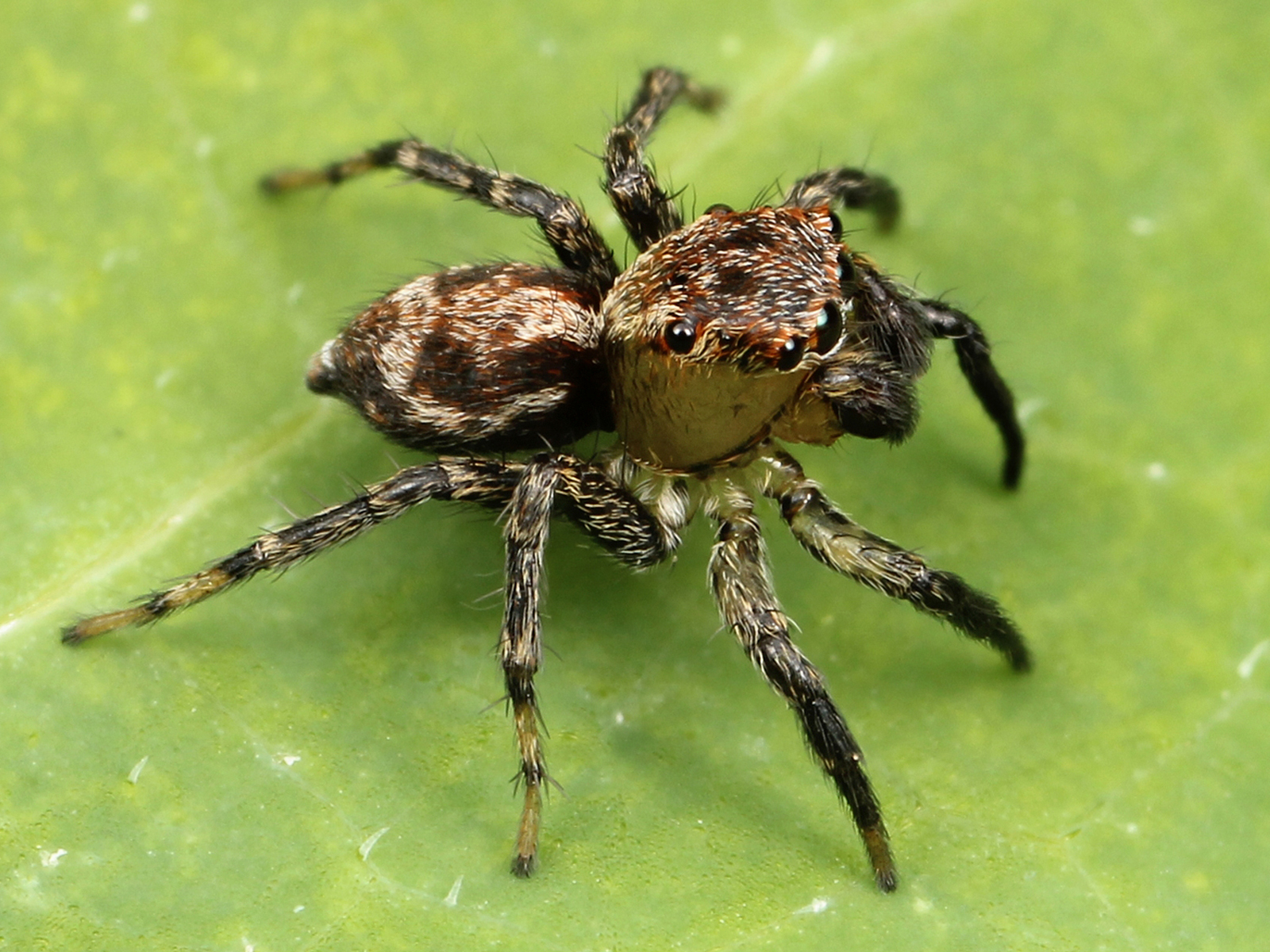
- Male Naphrys pulex

Scientific classification
- Kingdom: Animalia
- Phylum: Arthropoda
- Subphylum: Chelicerata
- Class: Arachnida
- Order: Araneae
- Infraorder: Araneomorphae
- Family: Salticidae
- Subfamily: Salticinae
- Genus: Naphrys; Edwards, 2003

Type species
- N. acerba (Peckham & Peckham, 1909)

Species
- 4, see text

= Naphrys =

Genus of spiders

Naphrys is a genus of North American jumping spiders that was first described by G.B. Edwards in 2003. The name is a portmanteau of "North America" and "Euophrys".

== Species ==
As of July 2026 it contains seven species, found only in Canada, Mexico, and the United States:

- Naphrys acerba (Peckham & Peckham, 1909) (type) – USA, Mexico
- Naphrys bufoides (Chamberlin & Ivie, 1944) – USA
- Naphrys echeri Maldonado-Carrizales, Valdez-Mondragón, Jiménez-Jiménez & Ponce-Saavedra, 2025
- Naphrys pulex (Hentz, 1846) – USA, Canada
- Naphrys tecoxquin Maldonado-Carrizales, Valdez-Mondragón, Jiménez-Jiménez & Ponce-Saavedra, 2025
- Naphrys tuuca Maldonado-Carrizales, Valdez-Mondragón, Jiménez-Jiménez & Ponce-Saavedra, 2025
- Naphrys xerophila (Richman, 1981) – USA
