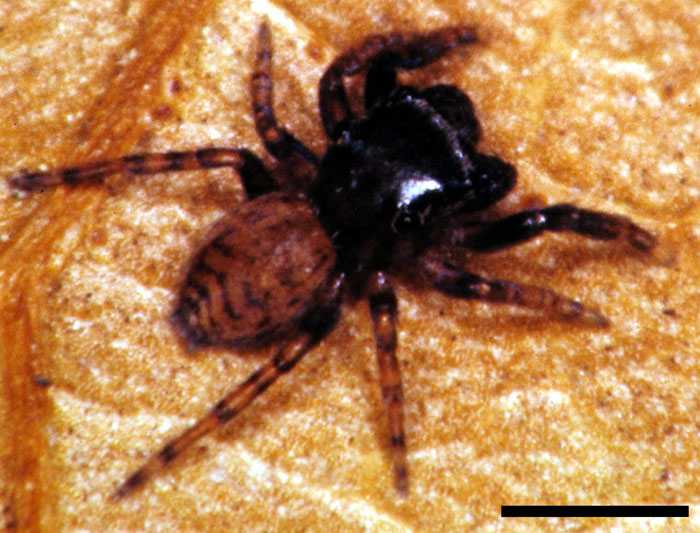
- Male

Scientific classification
- Kingdom: Animalia
- Phylum: Arthropoda
- Subphylum: Chelicerata
- Class: Arachnida
- Order: Araneae
- Infraorder: Araneomorphae
- Family: Salticidae
- Genus: Neon
- Species: N. nelli

Binomial name
- Neon nelli Peckham & Peckham, 1888

= Neon nelli =

Species of spider

Neon nelli is a species of jumping spider. It is found in the eastern United States and Canada. Adult spiders measure between 1.8 and 3 mm in body length. Males and females have similar coloration.

Neon nelli is similar in appearance to Neon reticulatus, but can be distinguished based on the genitalia. The atria of the epigyne are large in N. nelli, approaching the size of the oval sperm receptacles. In N. reticulatus, the atria are only half the diameter of the receptacles. The males can be distinguished by the embolus of the pedipalp, which is thicker at the base in N. nelli.
