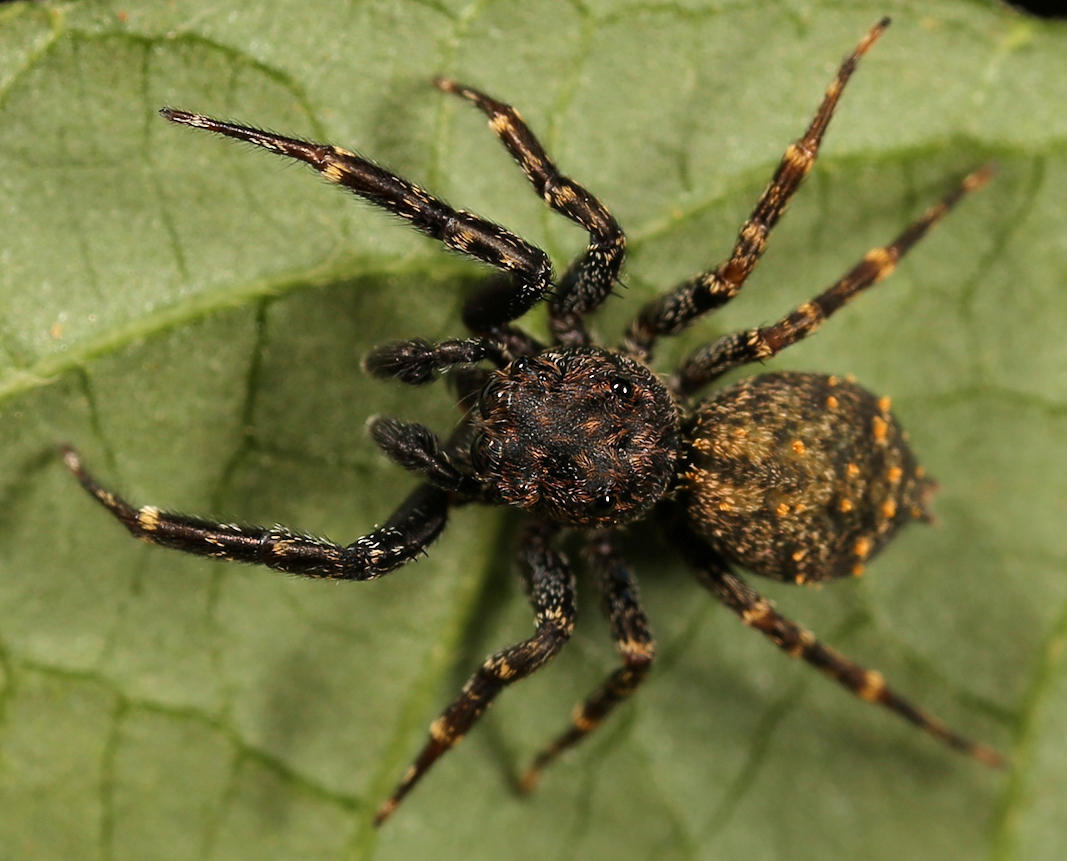
- M. natalensis
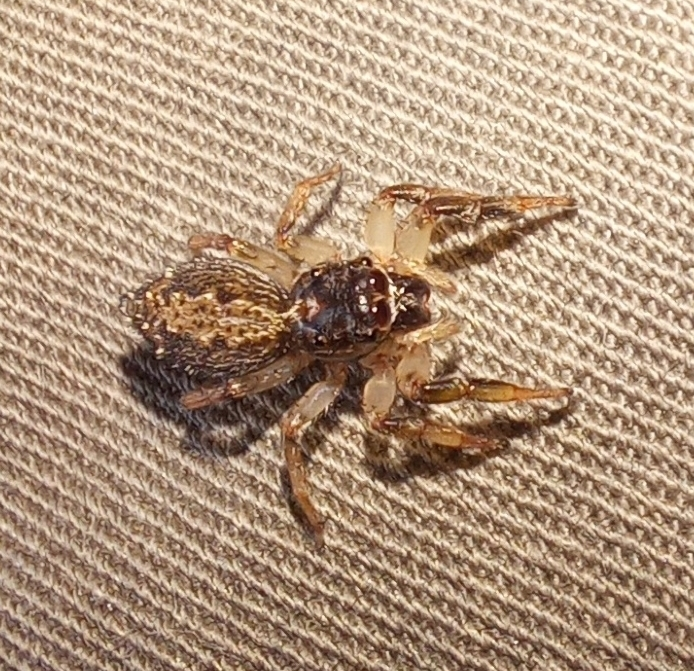
- M. honesta

Scientific classification
- Kingdom: Animalia
- Phylum: Arthropoda
- Subphylum: Chelicerata
- Class: Arachnida
- Order: Araneae
- Infraorder: Araneomorphae
- Family: Salticidae
- Subfamily: Hisponinae
- Genus: Massagris; Simon, 1900

Species
- 8, see text

= Massagris =

Genus of spiders

Massagris is a genus of African jumping spiders that was first described by Eugène Louis Simon in 1900.

== Species ==
As of October 2025, this genus includes eight species:

- Massagris budongo Wiśniewski & Wesołowska, 2023 – Uganda
- Massagris honesta Wesołowska, 1993 – South Africa
- Massagris maculosa Wesołowska & Haddad, 2018 – South Africa
- Massagris mirifica G. W. Peckham & E. G. Peckham, 1903 – South Africa
- Massagris mohale Wesołowska & Haddad, 2014 – Lesotho
- Massagris natalensis Wesołowska & Haddad, 2009 – South Africa
- Massagris schisma Maddison & Zhang, 2006 – South Africa
- Massagris separata Wesołowska, 1993 – South Africa
