= Neon avalonus =

Scientific classification
- Kingdom: Animalia
- Phylum: Arthropoda
- Subphylum: Chelicerata
- Class: Arachnida
- Order: Araneae
- Infraorder: Araneomorphae
- Family: Salticidae
- Genus: Neon
- Species: N. avalonus

Binomial name
- Neon avalonus Gertsch & Ivie, 1955

Species of spider

Neon avalonus is a species of jumping spider in the family Salticidae. It is found in the United States.
