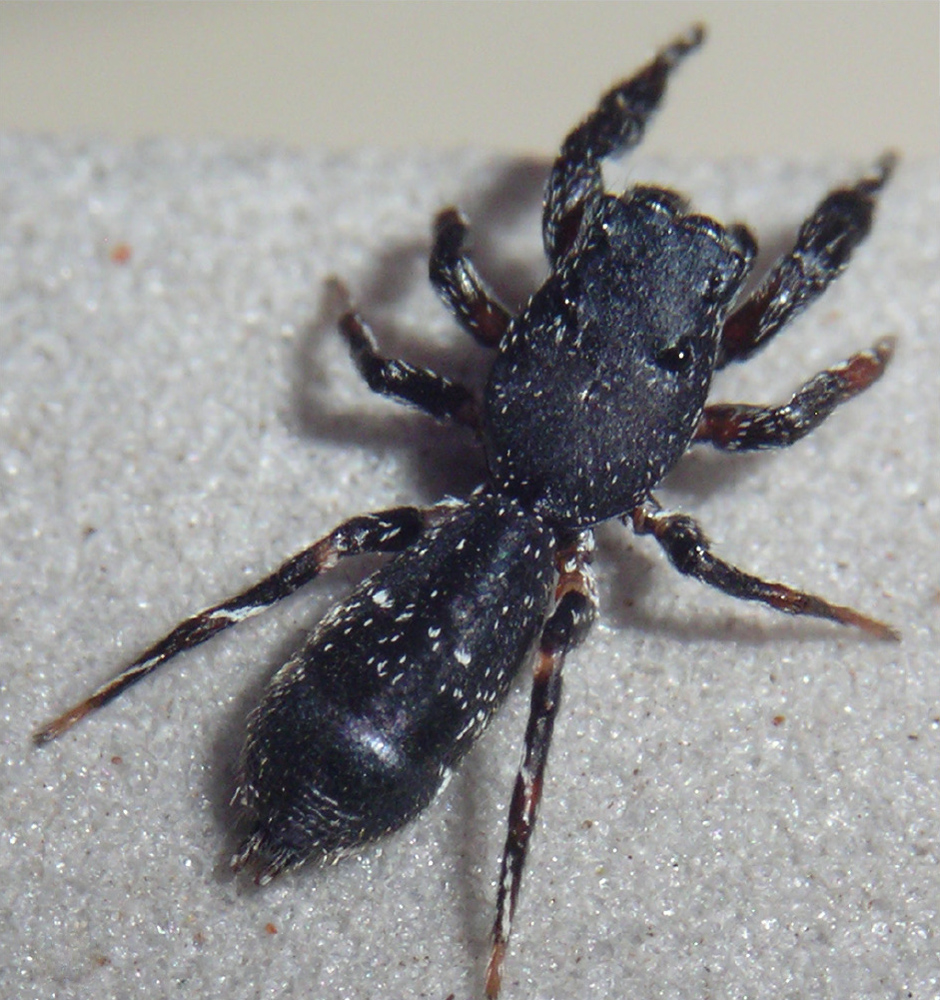
- Female Jerzego corticicola

Scientific classification
- Kingdom: Animalia
- Phylum: Arthropoda
- Subphylum: Chelicerata
- Class: Arachnida
- Order: Araneae
- Infraorder: Araneomorphae
- Family: Salticidae
- Subfamily: Hisponinae
- Genus: Jerzego; Maddison, 2014

Type species
- Jerzego corticicola Maddison, 2014

Species
- See text.

= Jerzego =

Genus of spiders

Jerzego is a spider genus of the jumping spider family, Salticidae, with three described species native to Asia.

== Etymology ==
The genus is named after the Polish arachnologist Jerzy Prószyński.

== Species ==
- Jerzego alboguttatus (Simon, 1903) – Malaysia, Sumatra
- Jerzego bipartitus (Simon, 1903) – Sri Lanka, India
- Jerzego corticicola Maddison, 2014 – Malaysia
