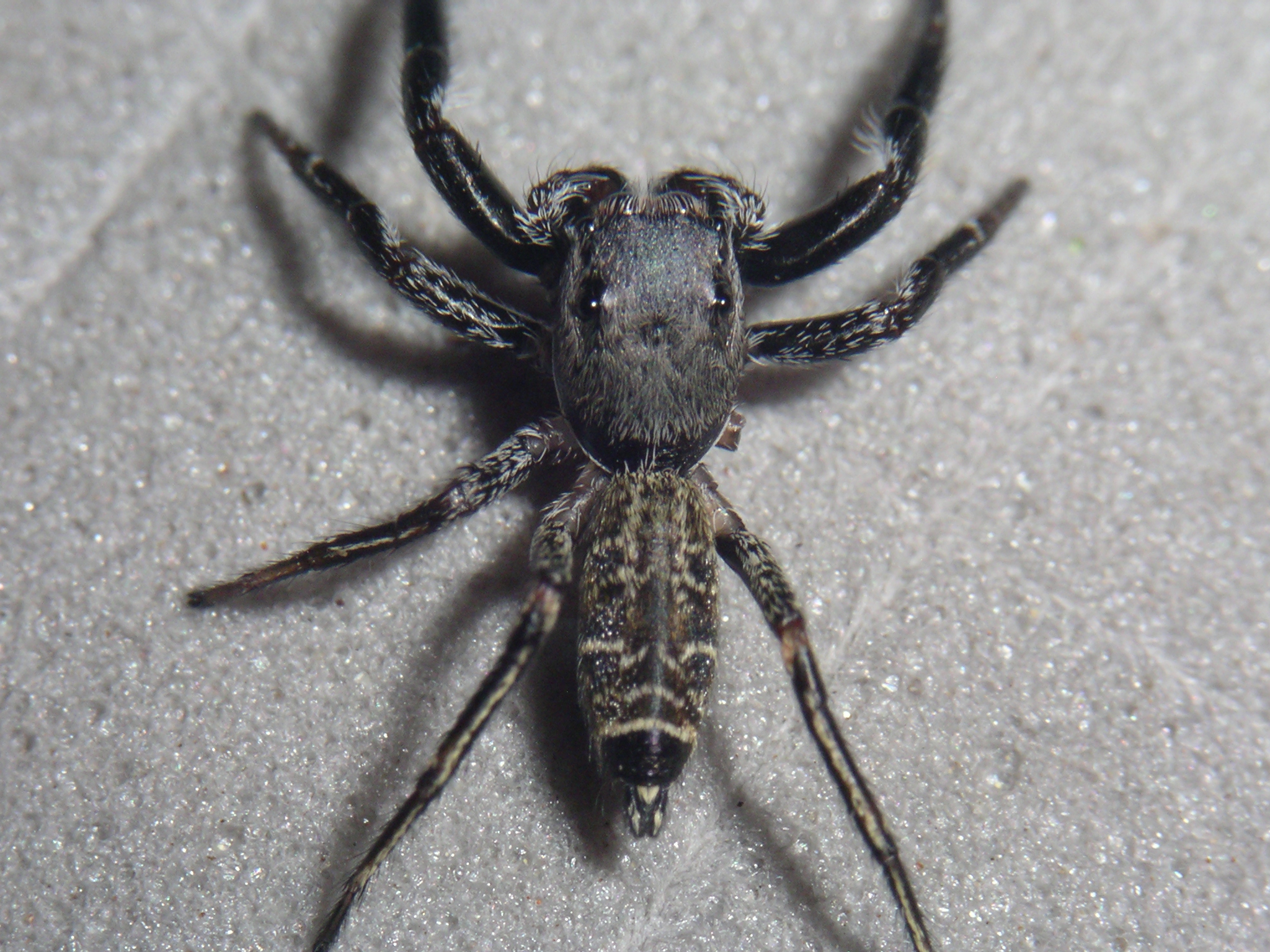
- Male B. akypueruna
- Female B. melvina

Scientific classification
- Kingdom: Animalia
- Phylum: Arthropoda
- Subphylum: Chelicerata
- Class: Arachnida
- Order: Araneae
- Infraorder: Araneomorphae
- Family: Salticidae
- Subfamily: Salticinae
- Genus: Breda; Peckham & Peckham, 1894

Type species
- B. milvina (C. L. Koch, 1846)

Species
- 13, see text

Synonyms
- Bredops Mello-Leitão, 1944; Oserictops Mello-Leitão, 1941; Paradescanso Vellard, 1924; Thianioides Mello-Leitão, 1941

= Breda (spider) =

Genus of spiders

Breda is a genus of jumping spiders that was first described by George Peckham & Elizabeth Peckham in 1894.

== Species ==
As of June 2019 it contains thirteen species, found in South America, Panama, Mexico, and on Trinidad:

- Breda akypueruna Ruiz & Brescovit, 2013 – Brazil
- Breda apicalis Simon, 1901 – Ecuador, Brazil, Paraguay, Argentina
- Breda bicruciata (Mello-Leitão, 1943) – Brazil, Uruguay, Argentina
- Breda bistriata (C. L. Koch, 1846) – Brazil, Argentina
- Breda lubomirskii (Taczanowski, 1878) – Colombia, Ecuador, Peru, Brazil
- Breda milvina (C. L. Koch, 1846) (type) – Mexico, Panama, Trinidad, Brazil, Bolivia
- Breda modesta (Taczanowski, 1878) – Peru, Brazil, Guyana, Paraguay, Argentina
- Breda nanica Ruiz & Brescovit, 2013 – Brazil
- Breda notata Chickering, 1946 – Panama
- Breda oserictops (Mello-Leitão, 1941) – Argentina
- Breda paraensis Ruiz & Brescovit, 2013 – Brazil
- Breda tristis Mello-Leitão, 1944 – Brazil, Uruguay, Argentina
- Breda variolosa Simon, 1901 – Brazil
