= Tomomingi szutsi =

Scientific classification
- Kingdom: Animalia
- Phylum: Arthropoda
- Subphylum: Chelicerata
- Class: Arachnida
- Order: Araneae
- Infraorder: Araneomorphae
- Family: Salticidae
- Genus: Tomomingi
- Species: T. szutsi

Binomial name
- Tomomingi szutsi Wesołowska & Haddad, 2013

Species of spider

Tomomingi szutsi is a species of jumping spider in the genus Tomomingi that was first described in 2013. It is related to the similar Tomomingi holmi, but lives in the grasslands of the Soutpansberg mountain range in South Africa. The spider is small, brown and hairy.

== Taxonomy ==
Tomomingi szutsi was first identified by Wanda Wesołowska and Charles Haddad in 2013. The spider was allocated to the genus Tomomingi on the basis of features like the shape of the palpal bulb. The species name recalls one of the authors of the genus, Támas Szűts.

== Description ==
The species is related to the spider Tomomingi holmi that is found in Kenya, and can be hard to distinguish, particularly for the female. The spider is small, brown and hairy, the male being generally darker and more hairy while the female is slightly larger, particularly in the abdomen which is 2.4 millimetres (0.094 in) long compared to 1.9 millimetres (0.075 in).

== Distribution ==
The spider is found in the Soutpansberg mountain range in Limpopo, South Africa. It is the only member of the genus found in subtropical southern Africa. It has been found in grasslands, unlike other members of the genus which generally prefer forests.
