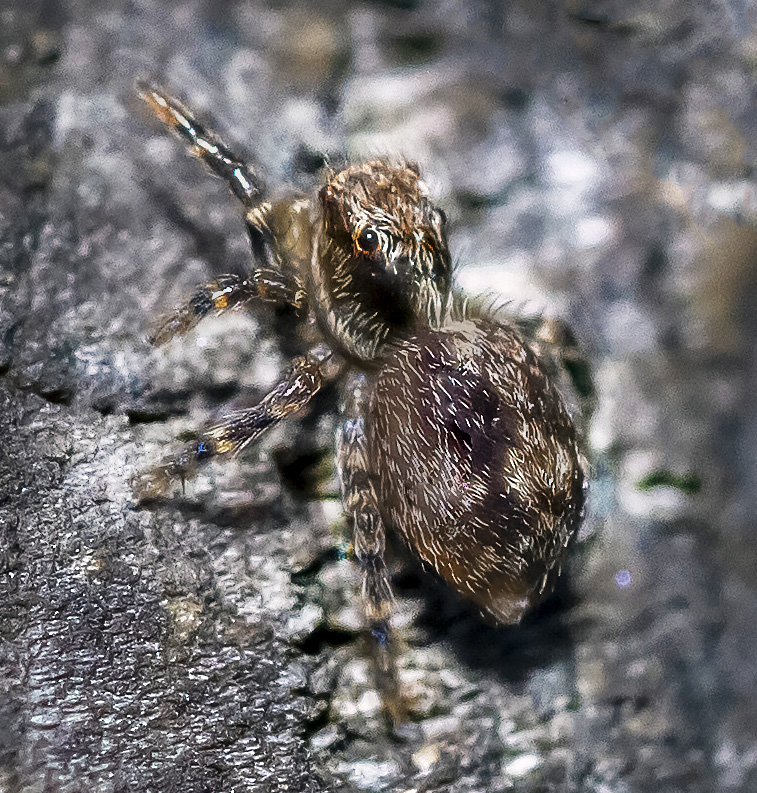
- Female
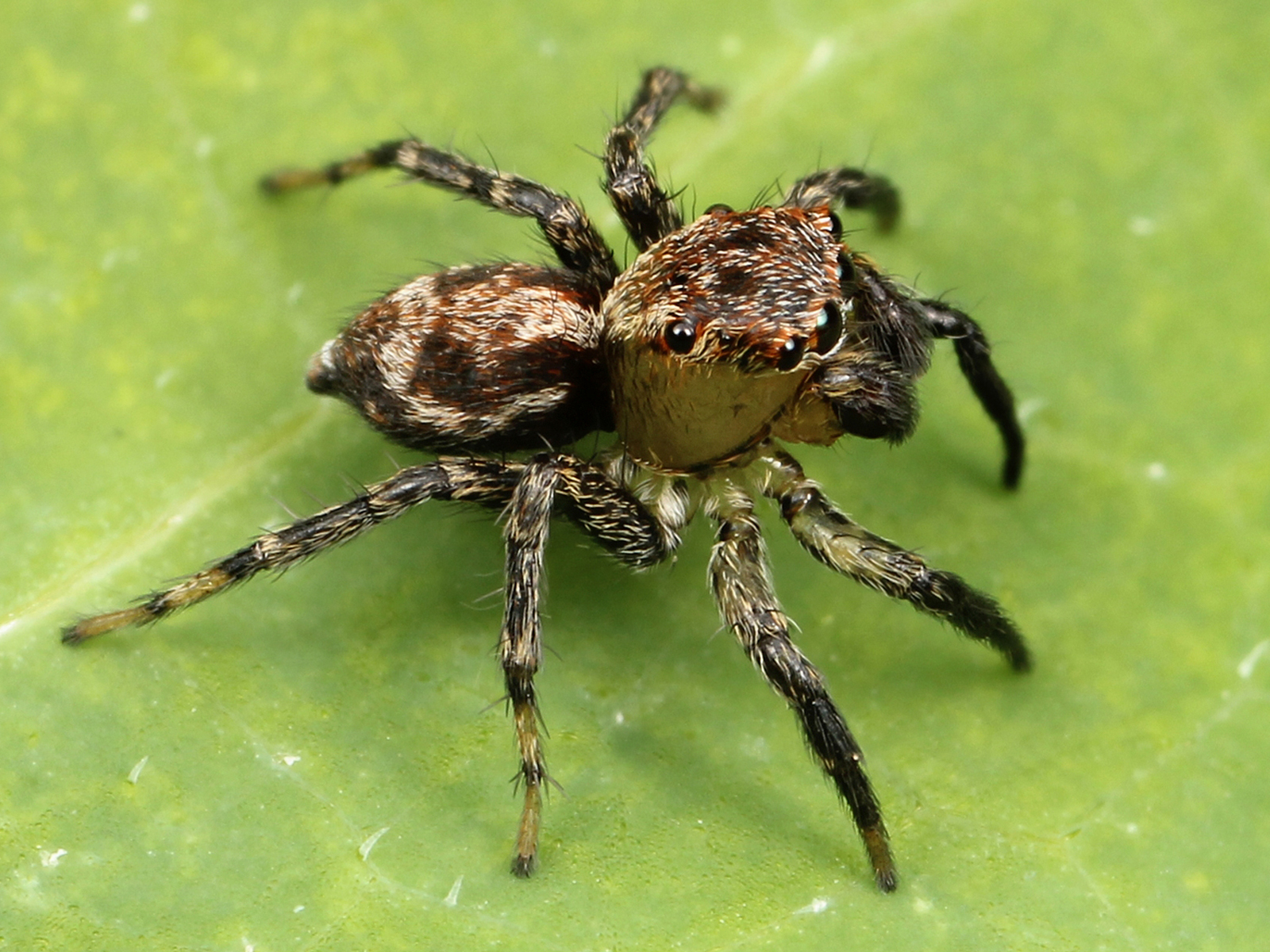
- Male

Scientific classification
- Kingdom: Animalia
- Phylum: Arthropoda
- Subphylum: Chelicerata
- Class: Arachnida
- Order: Araneae
- Infraorder: Araneomorphae
- Family: Salticidae
- Genus: Naphrys
- Species: N. pulex

Binomial name
- Naphrys pulex (Hentz, 1846)

Synonyms
- Attus pulex Hentz, 1846; Cyrba pulex (Hentz, 1846); Euophrys offuscata C. L. Koch, 1846; Habrocestum pulex (Hentz, 1846); Saitis pulex (Hentz, 1846); Saitis x-notata Keyserling, 1885

= Naphrys pulex =

Flea jumping spider

Species of spider

Naphrys pulex is a species of spider from the family Salticidae that is native to Canada and the United States.

== Taxonomy ==
The species was first described as Attus pulex by Nicholas Marcellus Hentz in 1846. It was later placed in a number of other genera, including Habrocestum, until a review of that genus in 1981 placed it in Naphrys.

== Description ==
Males have a total length of around 4 mm (0.2 in) of which the carapace makes up about 2 mm (0.08 in). The fourth leg is longest, followed by the third, first and second. The general coloration is described as "cryptic". There is a yellowish bar-shaped mark on the abdomen. The legs have spots and rings. Females are longer than males, with a total length of 4.6 to 6.1 mm (0.18 to 0.24 in), with a carapace 2.0 to 2.4 mm (0.08 to 0.09 in) long. Females have a similar coloration to males, but less distinct. The larger size and the shape of the male palpal bulb distinguish this species from others, such as Naphrys acerba.

== Sexual selection ==
Drawing of a male Naphrys pulex spider dancing before a female, in Edward Bagnall Poulton's 1890 The Colours of Animals

The courtship behaviour of the species, in which the male dances while the female watches, was observed by George and Elizabeth Peckham, and published in their 1889 research "Observations on sexual selection in spiders of the family Attidae". This was used by Edward Bagnall Poulton in his 1890 book The Colours of Animals to support his arguments in favour of sexual selection and an aesthetic sense in female spiders.

== Distribution and habitat ==
Naphrys pulex is native to Canada and the United States, where it is found mainly in the east. It has been observed on walls, grass and litter, on the ground, and on tree trunks.

== Ecology ==
Naphrys pulex feeds mainly on ants.
