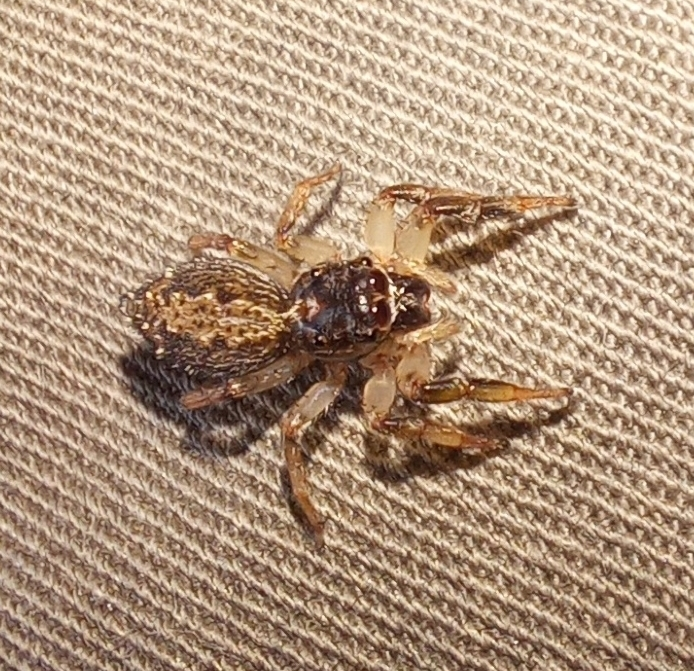

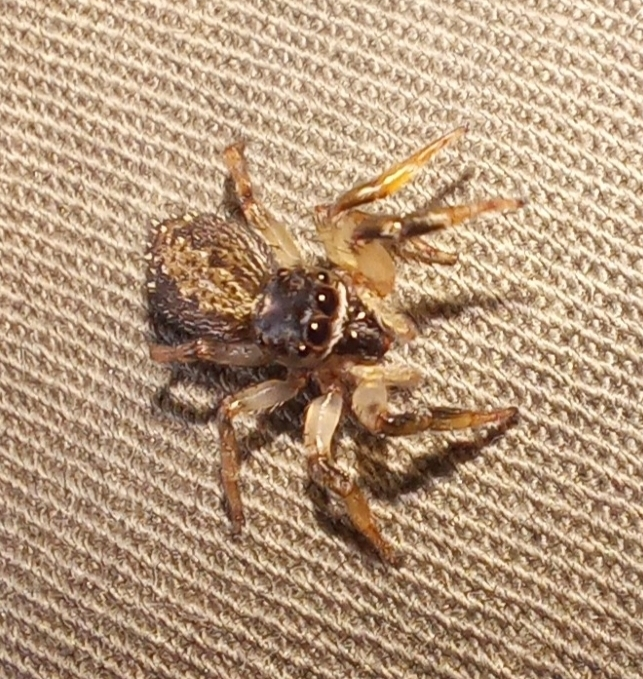

Scientific classification
- Kingdom: Animalia
- Phylum: Arthropoda
- Subphylum: Chelicerata
- Class: Arachnida
- Order: Araneae
- Infraorder: Araneomorphae
- Family: Salticidae
- Genus: Massagris
- Species: M. honesta

Binomial name
- Massagris honesta Wesołowska, 1993

= Massagris honesta =

Species of spider

Massagris honesta is a jumping spider species in the genus Massagris that lives in South Africa. It was first identified by Wanda Wesołowska in 1993.
