= Sinoinsula =

Scientific classification
- Kingdom: Animalia
- Phylum: Arthropoda
- Subphylum: Chelicerata
- Class: Arachnida
- Order: Araneae
- Infraorder: Araneomorphae
- Family: Salticidae
- Subfamily: Eupoinae
- Genus: Sinoinsula; Zhou & Li, 2013

Type species
- S. hebetata (Zhou & Li, 2013)

Species
- 12, see text

Genus of spiders

Sinoinsula is a genus of Chinese jumping spiders that was first described by Y. Y. Zhou & S. Q. Li in 2013.

== Species ==
As of August 2019 it contains twelve species, found only in China:

- Sinoinsula curva (Zhou & Li, 2013) – China
- Sinoinsula hebetata (Zhou & Li, 2013) (type) – China
- Sinoinsula limuensis (Zhou & Li, 2013) – China
- Sinoinsula longa (Zhou & Li, 2013) – China
- Sinoinsula maculata (Peng & Kim, 1997) – China
- Sinoinsula minuta (Zhou & Li, 2013) – China
- Sinoinsula nigricula (Zhou & Li, 2013) – China
- Sinoinsula ramosa (Zhou & Li, 2013) – China
- Sinoinsula scutata (Zhou & Li, 2013) – China
- Sinoinsula squamata (Zhou & Li, 2013) – China
- Sinoinsula tumida (Zhou & Li, 2013) – China
- Sinoinsula uncinata (Zhou & Li, 2013) – China
