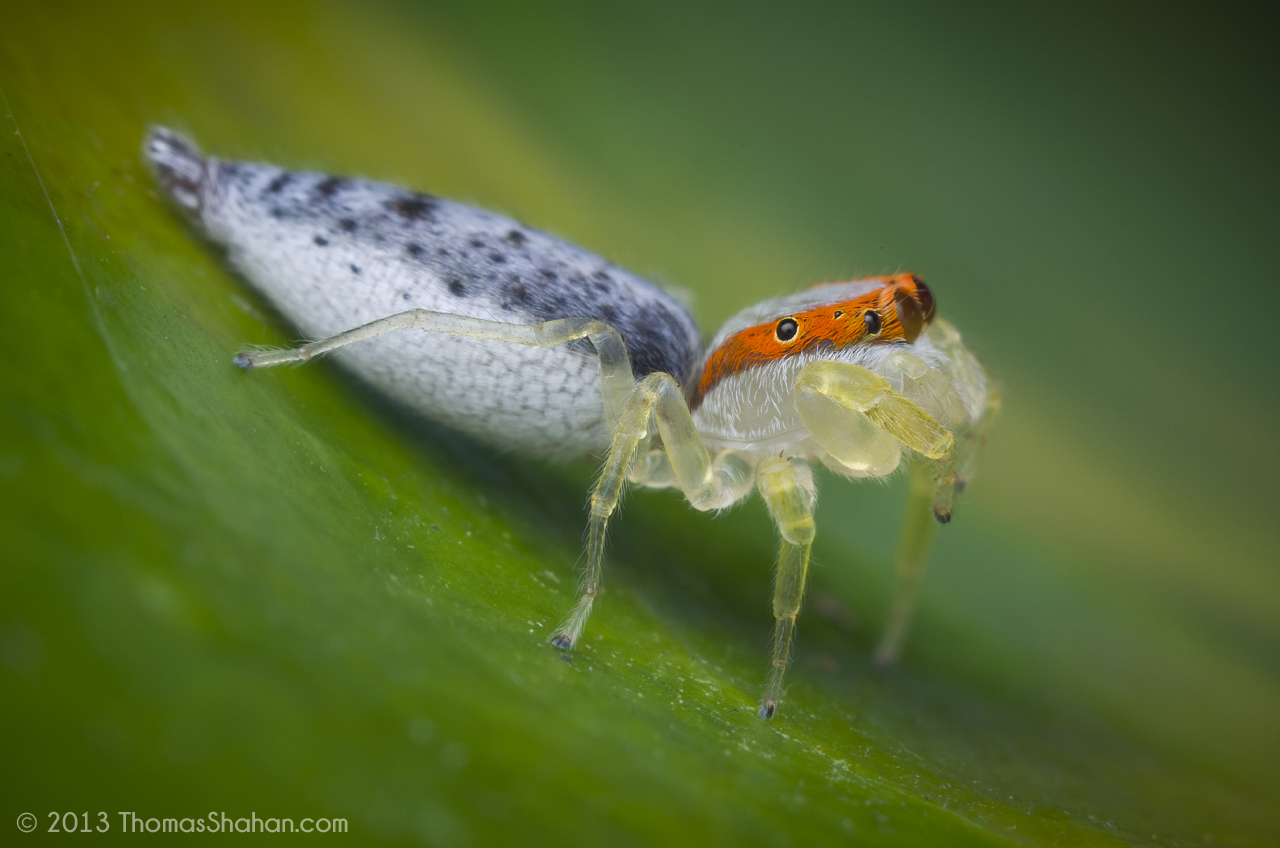
- Cotinusa sp.

Scientific classification
- Kingdom: Animalia
- Phylum: Arthropoda
- Subphylum: Chelicerata
- Class: Arachnida
- Order: Araneae
- Infraorder: Araneomorphae
- Family: Salticidae
- Subfamily: Salticinae
- Genus: Cotinusa; Simon, 1900

Type species
- C. distincta (Peckham & Peckham, 1888)

Species
- 31, see text

Synonyms
- Gertschnusa Mello-Leitão, 1947; Gophoa Simon, 1901

= Cotinusa =

Genus of spiders

Cotinusa is a genus of jumping spiders indigenous primarily to the Americas, with a localized distribution spanning from Mexico through Central and South America, alongside an anomalous regional outlier reported in Asia. The genus was first formally described and established in 1900 by the prolific French arachnologist Eugène Louis Simon, who established the fundamental morphological criteria utilized to categorize these distinct hunting spiders.

== Morphology and taxonomy ==
Members of the genus Cotinusa exhibit specialized anatomical traits characteristic of advanced jumping spiders, including exceptionally sharp vision facilitated by large, forward-facing anterior median eyes and a compact, muscular cephalothorax optimized for explosive leaping. Over the course of the twentieth century, several taxonomic adjustments were performed by various experts in South American entomology, resulting in the absorption of two historic genera. The genus Gertschnusa, designated by the Brazilian zoologist Cândido Firmino de Mello-Leitão in 1947, and the genus Gophoa, established by Simon himself in 1901, were later scrutinized by taxonomist María Elena Galiano and formally classified as junior synonyms of Cotinusa. This consolidation unified the evolutionary group under a singular valid scientific name.

== Distribution and habitat ==
The overwhelming majority of the thirty-one recognized species within this genus inhabit the dense tropical rainforests, neotropical savannas, and diverse woodland biomes of South America, with an exceptionally high concentration of unique species cataloged within the borders of Brazil and Argentina. The generic range extends northward through Panama up into Mexico, demonstrating a broad adaptation to varied microclimates within Western Hemisphere ecosystems. Conversely, a solitary species, Cotinusa splendida, was documented by Sukh Dyal in 1935 in Pakistan, representing an isolated Asian geographic record that stands in stark contrast to the predominantly Neotropical distribution of the rest of the lineage.

== Species ==
As of June 2019, the World Spider Catalog recognizes thirty-one distinct species within the genus Cotinusa:

- Cotinusa adelae Mello-Leitão, 1944 – Argentina
- Cotinusa albescens Mello-Leitão, 1945 – Argentina
- Cotinusa bisetosa Simon, 1900 – Venezuela
- Cotinusa bryantae Chickering, 1946 – Panama
- Cotinusa cancellata (Mello-Leitão, 1943) – Brazil
- Cotinusa deserta (Peckham & Peckham, 1894) – Brazil
- Cotinusa dimidiata Simon, 1900 – Peru
- Cotinusa distincta (Peckham & Peckham, 1888) (type) – Mexico to Peru
- Cotinusa fenestrata (Taczanowski, 1878) – Peru
- Cotinusa furcifera (Schenkel, 1953) – Venezuela
- Cotinusa gemmea (Peckham & Peckham, 1894) – Brazil
- Cotinusa gertschi (Mello-Leitão, 1947) – Brazil
- Cotinusa horatia (Peckham & Peckham, 1894) – Brazil, Argentina
- Cotinusa irregularis (Mello-Leitão, 1945) – Argentina
- Cotinusa leucoprocta (Mello-Leitão, 1947) – Brazil
- Cotinusa magna (Peckham & Peckham, 1894) – Brazil, Argentina
- Cotinusa mathematica (Mello-Leitão, 1917) – Brazil
- Cotinusa melanura Mello-Leitão, 1939 – Paraguay
- Cotinusa puella Simon, 1900 – Brazil
- Cotinusa pulchra Mello-Leitão, 1917 – Brazil
- Cotinusa rosascostai Mello-Leitão, 1944 – Argentina
- Cotinusa rubriceps (Mello-Leitão, 1947) – Brazil
- Cotinusa septempunctata Simon, 1900 – Venezuela
- Cotinusa setosa (Mello-Leitão, 1947) – Brazil
- Cotinusa simoni Chickering, 1946 – Panama
- Cotinusa soesilae Makhan, 2009 – Suriname
- Cotinusa splendida (Dyal, 1935) – Pakistan
- Cotinusa stolzmanni (Taczanowski, 1878) – Peru
- Cotinusa trifasciata (Mello-Leitão, 1943) – Brazil, Argentina
- Cotinusa trimaculata Mello-Leitão, 1922 – Brazil
- Cotinusa vittata Simon, 1900 – Brazil, Argentina
