= Corusca =

Scientific classification
- Kingdom: Animalia
- Phylum: Arthropoda
- Subphylum: Chelicerata
- Class: Arachnida
- Order: Araneae
- Infraorder: Araneomorphae
- Family: Salticidae
- Subfamily: Eupoinae
- Genus: Corusca; Zhou & Li, 2013

Type species
- C. gracilis Zhou & Li, 2013

Species
- 10, see text

Genus of spiders

Corusca is a genus of Chinese jumping spiders that was first described by Y. Y. Zhou & S. Q. Li in 2013.

== Species ==
As of June 2019 it contains ten species, found only in China:

- Corusca acris Zhou & Li, 2013 – China
- Corusca bawangensis Zhou & Li, 2013 – China
- Corusca falcata Zhou & Li, 2013 – China
- Corusca gracilis Zhou & Li, 2013 (type) – China
- Corusca jianfengensis Zhou & Li, 2013 – China
- Corusca liaoi (Peng & Li, 2006) – China
- Corusca sanyaensis Zhou & Li, 2013 – China
- Corusca setifera Zhou & Li, 2013 – China
- Corusca viriosa Zhou & Li, 2013 – China
- Corusca wuzhishanensis Zhou & Li, 2013 – China
