= Tomomingi =

Scientific classification
- Kingdom: Animalia
- Phylum: Arthropoda
- Subphylum: Chelicerata
- Class: Arachnida
- Order: Araneae
- Infraorder: Araneomorphae
- Family: Salticidae
- Subfamily: Hisponinae
- Genus: Tomomingi; Szüts & Scharff, 2009

Type species
- T. wastani Szüts & Scharff, 2009

Species
- 8, see text

Genus of spiders

Tomomingi is a genus of African jumping spiders that was first described by T. Szűts & N. Scharff in 2009.

== Species ==
As of October 2026, this genus includes eight species:

- Tomomingi blicki Wesołowska, Russell-Smith & Danflous, 2026 – Uganda
- Tomomingi holmi (Prószyński & Żabka, 1983) – Guinea, Kenya
- Tomomingi keinoi (Prószyński & Żabka, 1983) – Uganda, Kenya
- Tomomingi kikuyu (Prószyński & Żabka, 1983) – Kenya
- Tomomingi nywele Szűts & Scharff, 2009 – Tanzania
- Tomomingi silvae Szűts & Scharff, 2009 – Equatorial Guinea (Bioko)
- Tomomingi sjostedti (Lessert, 1925) – Kenya, Tanzania
- Tomomingi szutsi Wesołowska & Haddad, 2013 – South Africa
- Tomomingi wastani Szűts & Scharff, 2009 – Tanzania (type species)
