= Neon levis =

Scientific classification
- Kingdom: Animalia
- Phylum: Arthropoda
- Subphylum: Chelicerata
- Class: Arachnida
- Order: Araneae
- Infraorder: Araneomorphae
- Family: Salticidae
- Genus: Neon
- Species: N. levis

Binomial name
- Neon levis (Simon, 1871)

Synonyms
- Attus levis Neon laevis

Species of spider

Neon levis is a jumping spider with palearctic distribution, occurring in Southern and Western Europe, northern Africa and Xinjiang (China). Females reach a size of up to 3 mm, males up to 2.5 mm. They are of a light yellowish-brown color, the legs having a light-dark annulation. Adult animals can be found in Germany from March to July.

These spiders occur in sunny, dry locations with little vegetation. In Germany the species is considered endangered.

== Name ==
The species name is derived from Latin laevis "smooth, light".
