= Eupoa =

Scientific classification
- Kingdom: Animalia
- Phylum: Arthropoda
- Subphylum: Chelicerata
- Class: Arachnida
- Order: Araneae
- Infraorder: Araneomorphae
- Family: Salticidae
- Subfamily: Eupoinae
- Genus: Eupoa; Zabka, 1985

Type species
- Eupoa prima Zabka, 1985

Species
- 18, see text

Genus of spiders

Eupoa is a genus of spiders in the family Salticidae (jumping spiders). Originally known only from one species from Vietnam, several other species have been described since 1997, all from Asia.

Spiders of this genus have unusual pedipalps, and do probably not belong to the Salticoida, the main clade of jumping spiders. It is basal, but placement is not yet clear. Possibly Eupoa has branched from other basal groups like Lyssomaninae or Spartaeinae a long time ago.

Specimens of E. prima were collected from leaf litter.

== Description ==
Eupoa are small salticids, with E. prima only reaching about 2 mm in both sexes. Although not closely related, it looks a bit like Neon, another litter dwelling species.

The abdomen is dark with light elongate transversal patches.

== Species ==
As of February 2023, it contains eighteen species:

- Eupoa daklak Logunov & Marusik, 2014 — Vietnam
- Eupoa hainanensis Peng & Kim, 1997 — China (Hainan)
- Eupoa jingwei Maddison & Zhang, 2007 — China
- Eupoa lehtineni Logunov & Marusik, 2014 — India, Thailand, Vietnam
- Eupoa lobli Logunov & Marusik, 2014 — Malaysia
- Eupoa logunovi Wang & Li, 2022 — China
- Eupoa maddisoni Wang, Li & Pham, 2023 — Vietnam
- Eupoa maidinhyeni Wang, Li & Pham, 2023 — Vietnam
- Eupoa nezha Maddison & Zhang, 2007 — China
- Eupoa ninhbinh Wang, Li & Pham, 2023 — Vietnam
- Eupoa pappi Logunov & Marusik, 2014 — Thailand
- Eupoa pengi Liu, 2021 — China
- Eupoa prima Żabka, 1985 — Vietnam
- Eupoa pulchella Logunov & Marusik, 2014 — Thailand, Laos
- Eupoa schwendingeri Logunov & Marusik, 2014 — Thailand
- Eupoa thailandica Logunov & Marusik, 2014 — Thailand
- Eupoa yunnanensis Peng & Kim, 1997 — China, Laos
- Eupoa zabkai Wang, Li & Pham, 2023 — Vietnam
