= Tomobella =

Scientific classification
- Kingdom: Animalia
- Phylum: Arthropoda
- Subphylum: Chelicerata
- Class: Arachnida
- Order: Araneae
- Infraorder: Araneomorphae
- Family: Salticidae
- Subfamily: Hisponinae
- Genus: Tomobella; Szüts & Scharff, 2009

Type species
- T. fotsy Szüts & Scharff, 2009

Species
- T. andasibe (Maddison & Zhang, 2006) – Madagascar; T. fotsy Szüts & Scharff, 2009 – Madagascar

Genus of spiders

Tomobella is a genus of Malagasy jumping spiders that was first described by T. Szűts & N. Scharff in 2009. As of August 2019 it contains only two species, found only on Madagascar: T. andasibe and T. fotsy.
