= Hispo striolata =

Conservation status
- Endangered (IUCN 3.1)

Scientific classification
- Kingdom: Animalia
- Phylum: Arthropoda
- Subphylum: Chelicerata
- Class: Arachnida
- Order: Araneae
- Infraorder: Araneomorphae
- Family: Salticidae
- Genus: Hispo
- Species: H. striolata

Binomial name
- Hispo striolata (Simon, 1898)

Species of spider

Hispo striolata is a species of jumping spider (family Salticidae). The species is endemic to Mahé Island, Silhouette Island and Praslin Island of Seychelles.
