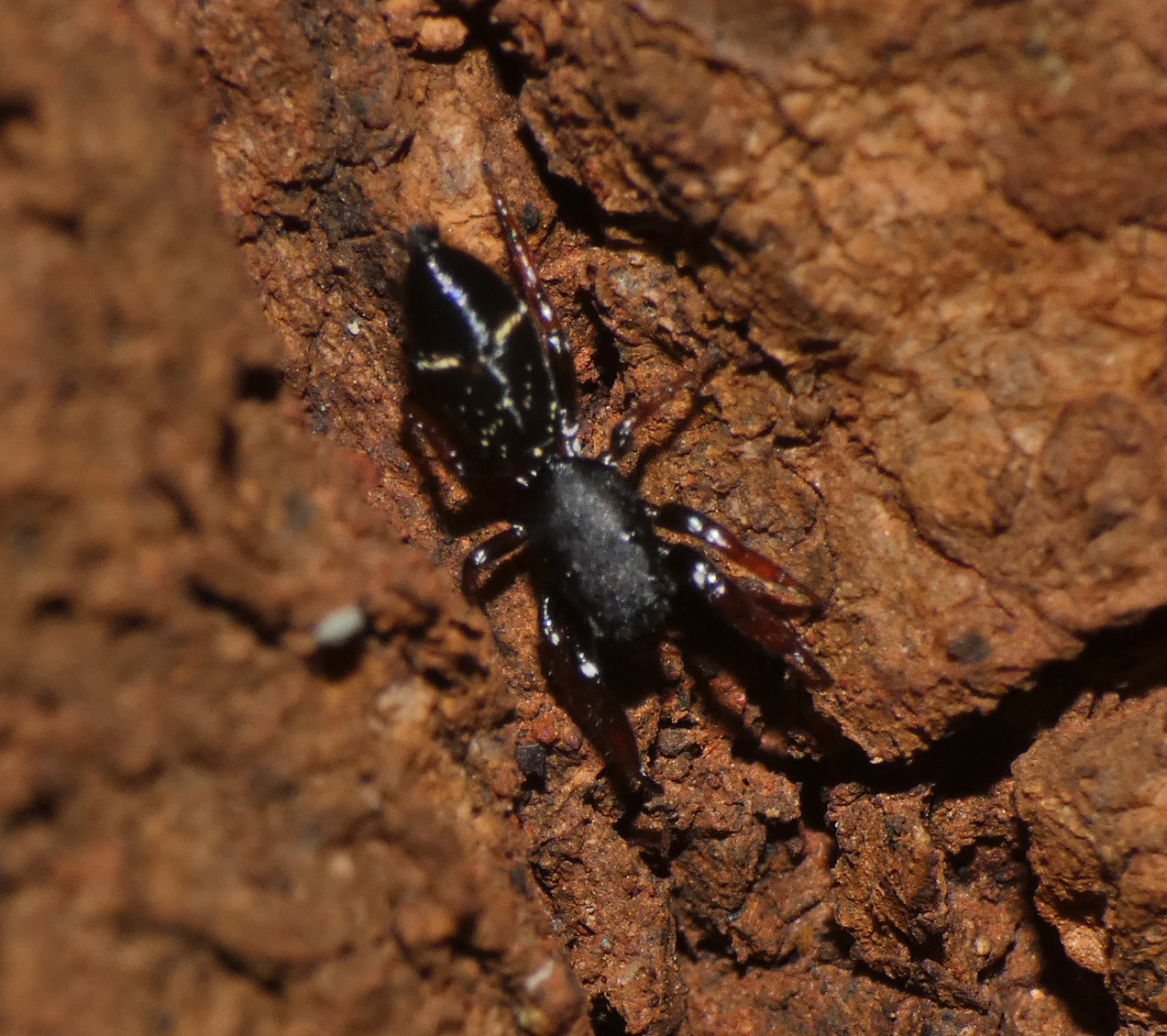
- male
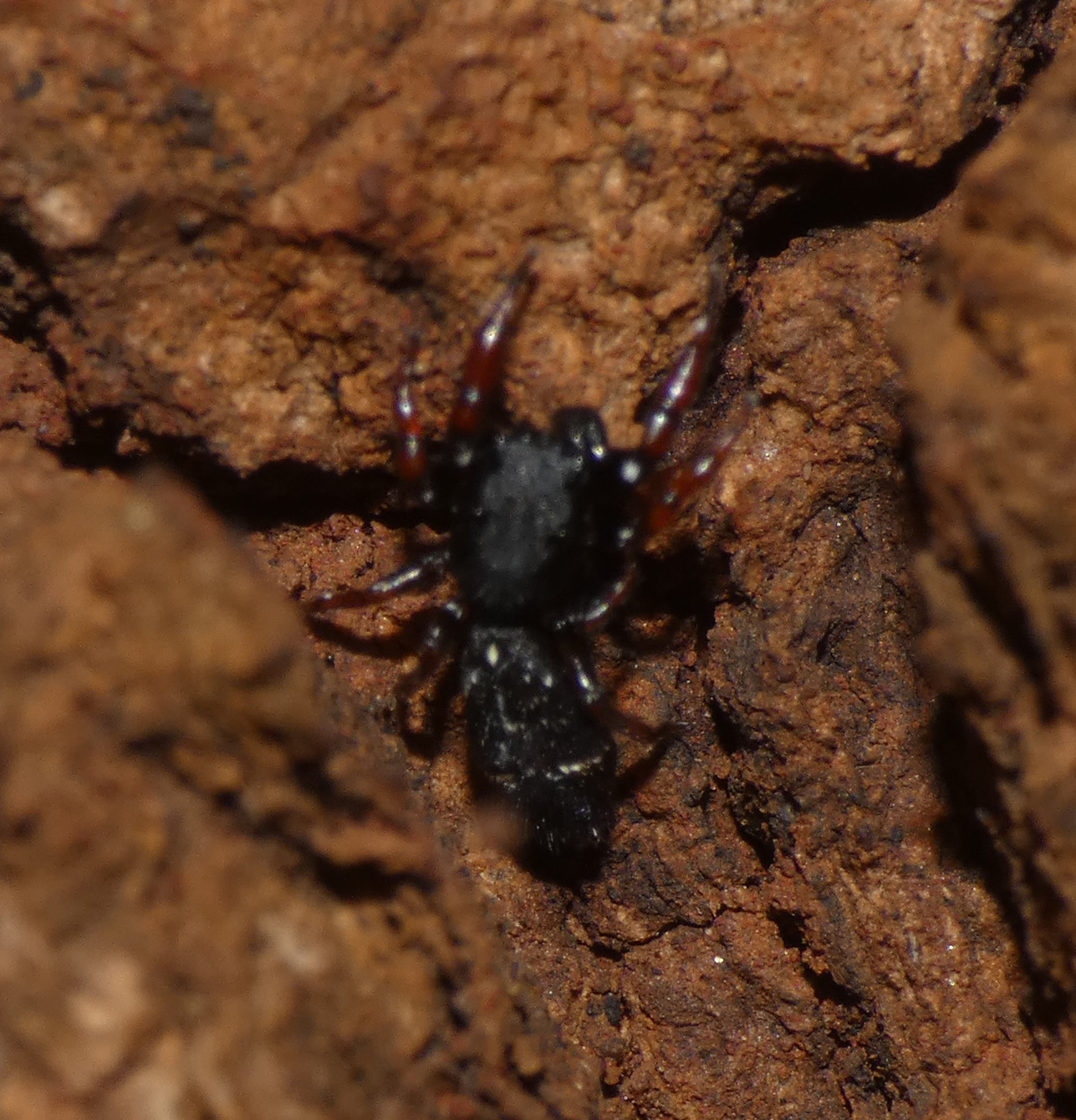

Scientific classification
- Kingdom: Animalia
- Phylum: Arthropoda
- Subphylum: Chelicerata
- Class: Arachnida
- Order: Araneae
- Infraorder: Araneomorphae
- Family: Salticidae
- Genus: Hispo
- Species: H. georgius

Binomial name
- Hispo georgius (Peckham & Peckham, 1892)

Synonyms
- Leptorchestes georgius Peckham & Peckham, 1892; Quekettia georgii Peckham & Peckham, 1902; Pseudomarengo inermis Caporiacco, 1947; Pseudomarengo rufescens Caporiacco, 1947; Hispo inermis (Caporiacco, 1947); Quekettia georgius (Peckham & Peckham, 1892)

= Hispo georgius =

Species of spider

== Distribution ==
Hispo georgius is found in Angola, Botswana, Democratic Republic of the Congo, Kenya, Madagascar, South Africa and Zimbabwe.

Within South Africa, it is known from Eastern Cape, KwaZulu-Natal, Limpopo, Mpumalanga, and Western Cape.

== Habitat and ecology ==
Specimens were sampled from under the bark of large trees such as Vachellia, Commiphora and Bauhinia in the Savanna Biome at altitudes ranging from 47 to 1307 m.

Their retreats are constructed of thin silk stuck onto the inner surface of a flake of bark or inside a narrow crack on a tree trunk.

== Conservation ==
Hispo georgius is listed as of Least Concern by the South African National Biodiversity Institute due to its wide geographical range. There are no known threats to the species. In South Africa, it is protected in four protected areas: Ndumo Game Reserve, Ophathe Game Reserve, Tembe Elephant Park and Kruger National Park.

== Taxonomy ==
Hispo georgius was originally described in 1892 from Madagascar as Leptorchestes georgius by George and Elizabeth Peckham. The species was redescribed by Wesołowska and Cumming in 2008.
