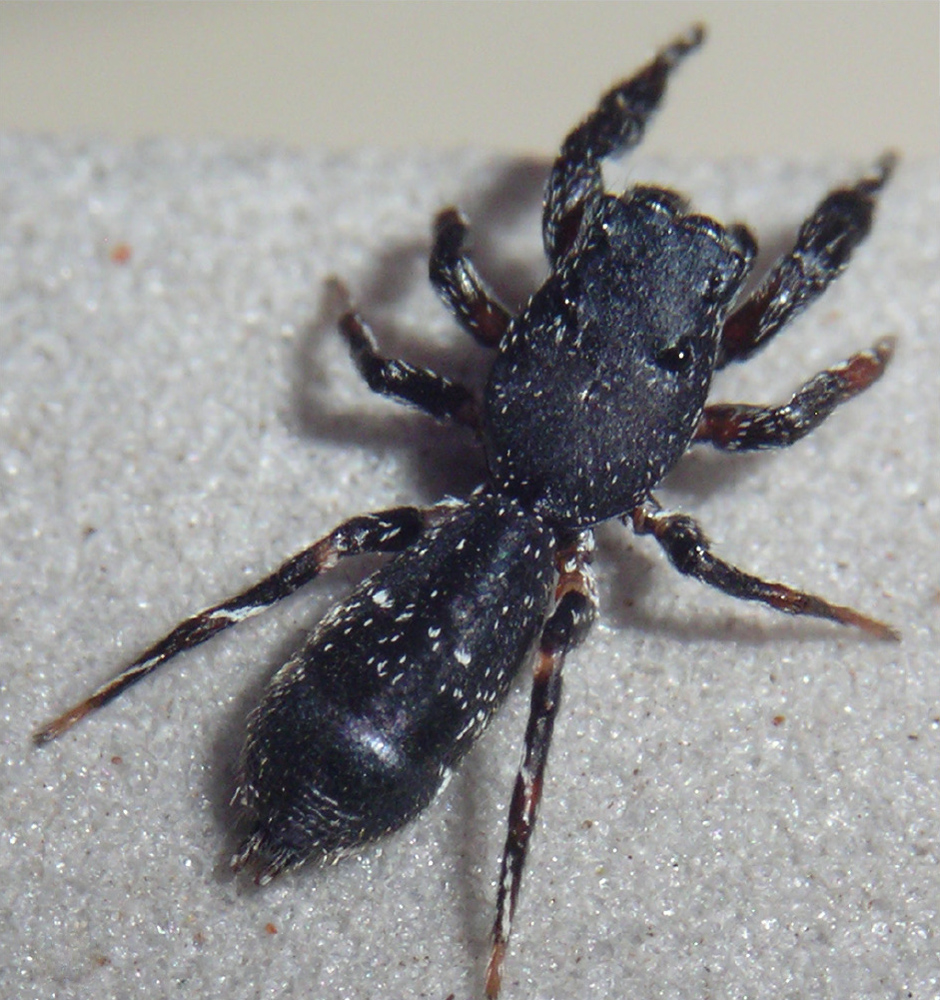
- Female Jerzego corticicola

Scientific classification
- Kingdom: Animalia
- Phylum: Arthropoda
- Subphylum: Chelicerata
- Class: Arachnida
- Order: Araneae
- Infraorder: Araneomorphae
- Family: Salticidae
- Subfamily: Hisponinae; Simon, 1901

Genera
- See text.

= Hisponinae =

Subfamily of spiders

Hisponinae is a subfamily of jumping spiders (family Salticidae). The subfamily has six known extant genera and three extinct genera.

== Description ==
Members of the subfamily Hisponinae have a distinctive constriction or furrow in the carapace just behind the small eyes. They share some features with those of the much larger subfamily Salticinae, such as reduction of the size of the posterior median eyes, and the loss of the conductor of the palpal bulb. Hisponine females have a very much reduced tarsal claw on the pedipalp (salticines have lost this claw altogether).

== Taxonomy ==
The group was first described by Eugène Simon in 1901 as "Hisponeae". It has subsequently been treated as the subfamily Hisponinae, often using the informal name "hisponines".

=== Phylogeny ===
The relationships among the basal salticids are not yet fully resolved; summary cladograms published in both 2014 and 2015 show unresolved branching for five basal subfamilies. However, Hisponinae is resolved as sister to Salticinae, the most derived subfamily.

- Salticidae
  - Onomastinae
  - Asemoneinae
  - Lyssomaninae
  - Spartaeinae
  - Eupoinae
  - - Hisponinae
    - - Salticinae
        - Amycoida
        - Salticoida

== Genera ==
As of August 2020, the subfamily included six extant genera:

- Hispo Simon, 1886
- Jerzego Maddison, 2014
- Massagris Simon, 1900
- Tomobella Szűts & Scharff, 2009
- Tomocyrba Simon, 1900
- Tomomingi Szűts & Scharff, 2009

Some genera have been described by Alexander Petrunkevitch from Baltic amber:

- †Almolinus Petrunkevitch, 1958
- †Gorgopsina Petrunkevitch, 1955
- †Prolinus Petrunkevitch, 1958
