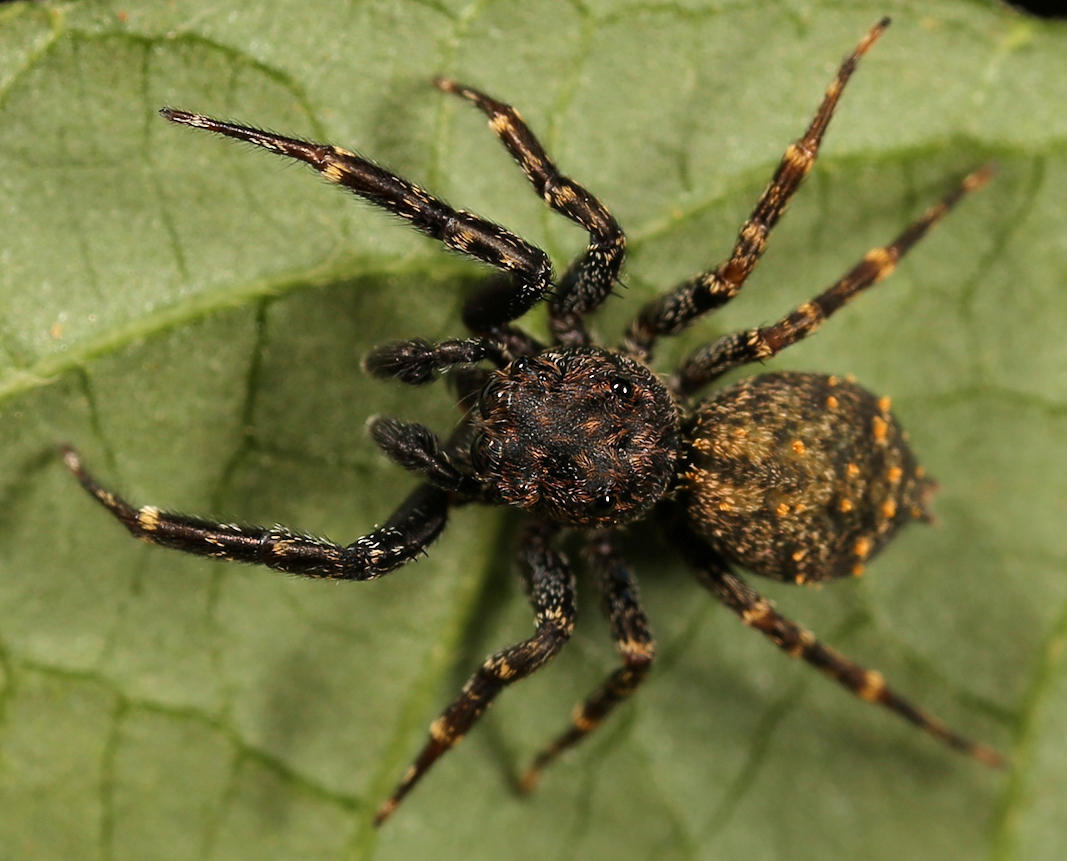

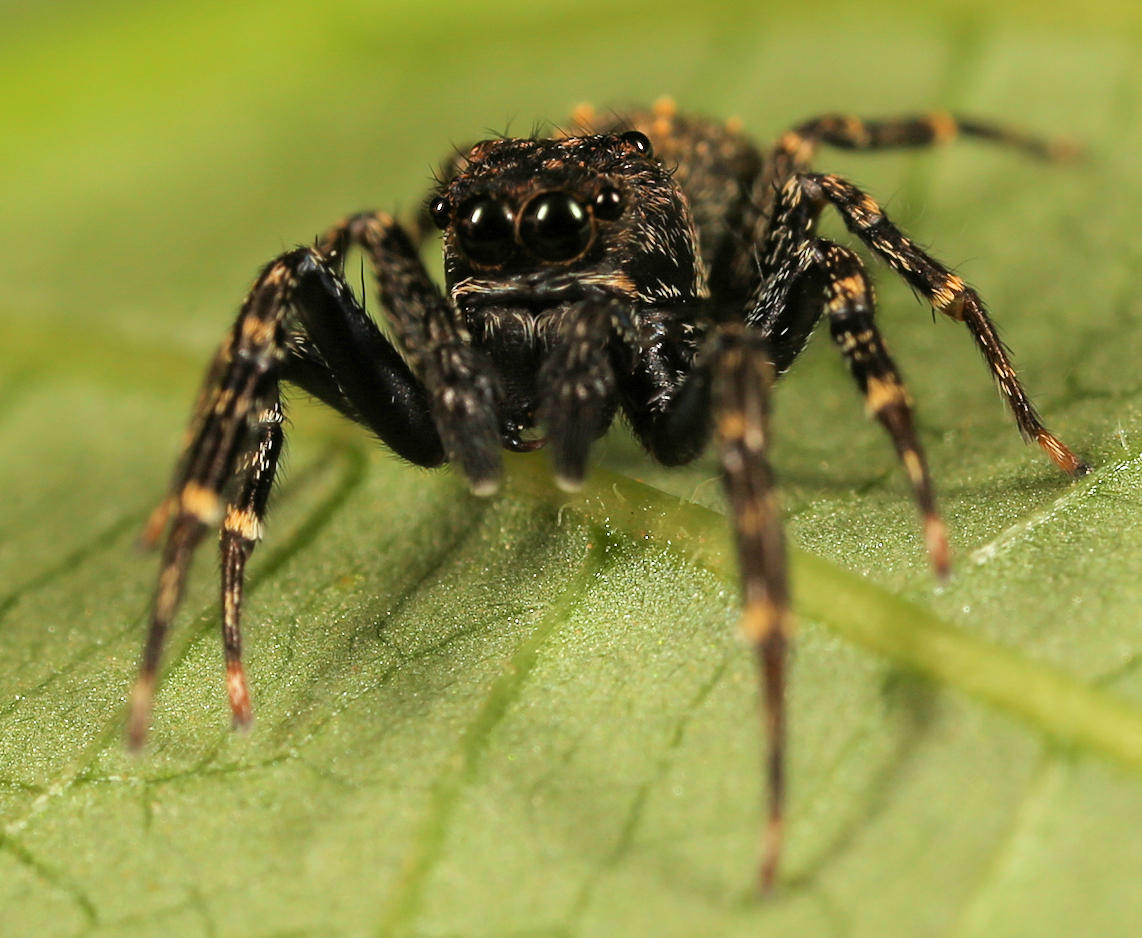

Scientific classification
- Kingdom: Animalia
- Phylum: Arthropoda
- Subphylum: Chelicerata
- Class: Arachnida
- Order: Araneae
- Infraorder: Araneomorphae
- Family: Salticidae
- Genus: Massagris
- Species: M. natalensis

Binomial name
- Massagris natalensis Wesołowska & Haddad, 2009

= Massagris natalensis =

Species of spider

Massagris natalensis is a jumping spider species in the genus Massagris that lives in South Africa. It was first identified in 2009.
