= Jerzego alboguttatus =

Scientific classification
- Kingdom: Animalia
- Phylum: Arthropoda
- Subphylum: Chelicerata
- Class: Arachnida
- Order: Araneae
- Infraorder: Araneomorphae
- Family: Salticidae
- Genus: Jerzego
- Species: J. alboguttatus

Binomial name
- Jerzego alboguttatus (Simon, 1903)

Synonyms
- Hispo alboguttata Simon, 1903

Species of spider

Jerzego alboguttatus is a spider species of the family Salticidae (jumping spiders). The species is only known from one immature female described in 1903 by Eugène Simon.

== Description ==
The cephalothorax is quite flat, the carapace rather elongate oval and slightly flared near the front. The whole carapace is orange, with a black fringe around the eyes. The yellow brown abdomen is long and narrow, rounded at the front, with long straight, slightly diverging sides that curve to a point near the spinnerets. Several round tufts of white hair are found in pairs. The first two leg pairs are enlarged with weak ventral spines. The legs are generally yellow, with black tinging at the first pair.

== Distribution ==
Jerzego alboguttatus has been found only in Sumatra.

== Name ==
The species name is derived from Latin alboguttatus "white spotted".
