= Jerzego bipartitus =

Scientific classification
- Kingdom: Animalia
- Phylum: Arthropoda
- Subphylum: Chelicerata
- Class: Arachnida
- Order: Araneae
- Infraorder: Araneomorphae
- Family: Salticidae
- Genus: Jerzego
- Species: J. bipartitus

Binomial name
- Jerzego bipartitus (Simon, 1903)

Species of spider

Jerzego bipartitus, is a species of spider of the genus Jerzego. It is native to India and Sri Lanka.
