= Tomomingi blicki =

Scientific classification
- Kingdom: Animalia
- Phylum: Arthropoda
- Subphylum: Chelicerata
- Class: Arachnida
- Order: Araneae
- Infraorder: Araneomorphae
- Family: Salticidae
- Genus: Tomomingi
- Species: T. blicki

Binomial name
- Tomomingi blicki Wesołowska, Russell-Smith & Danflous, 2026

Species of spider

Tomomingi blicki is a species of jumping spider in the genus Tomomingi that lives in Central African Republic.
