= Neon zonatus =

Scientific classification
- Kingdom: Animalia
- Phylum: Arthropoda
- Subphylum: Chelicerata
- Class: Arachnida
- Order: Araneae
- Infraorder: Araneomorphae
- Family: Salticidae
- Genus: Neon
- Species: N. zonatus

Binomial name
- Neon zonatus Bao & Peng, 2002

Species of spider

Neon zonatus is a species of jumping spider found only in Taiwan. It is a tiny spider with a total length (excluding legs) of only 2.25 mm. The carapace is greyish brown with a yellowish brown central area and a black margin. The whole carapace is densely covered with white hair. The legs are light brown with black patches and large, prominent spines. The wide abdomen is boldly striped black and light brown.

This species is most similar to the widespread Neon minutus but the bold abdominal pattern is diagnostic.
