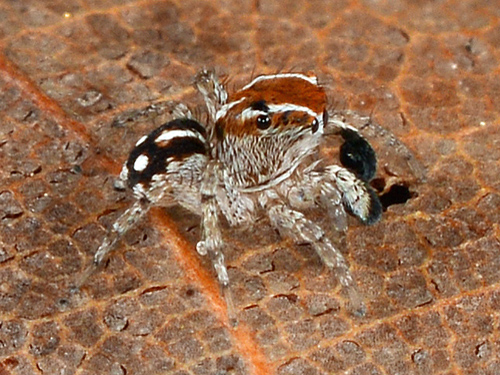
- Male in Wheeler County, Georgia

Scientific classification
- Kingdom: Animalia
- Phylum: Arthropoda
- Subphylum: Chelicerata
- Class: Arachnida
- Order: Araneae
- Infraorder: Araneomorphae
- Family: Salticidae
- Genus: Naphrys
- Species: N. xerophila

Binomial name
- Naphrys xerophila (Richman, 1981)

= Naphrys xerophila =

Species of spider

Naphrys xerophila is a species of jumping spider. It is found in Florida and Georgia in the southeastern United States. It is usually found in leaf litter in xeric (dry) habitats. Adults measure between 2 and 4 mm in length, females being on average larger than males.
