= Massagris budongo =

Scientific classification
- Kingdom: Animalia
- Phylum: Arthropoda
- Subphylum: Chelicerata
- Class: Arachnida
- Order: Araneae
- Infraorder: Araneomorphae
- Family: Salticidae
- Genus: Massagris
- Species: M. budongo

Binomial name
- Massagris budongo Wiśniewski & Wesołowska, 2024

Species of spider

Massagris budongo is a species of jumping spider in the genus Massagris that lives in Uganda. It was first described in 2024.
