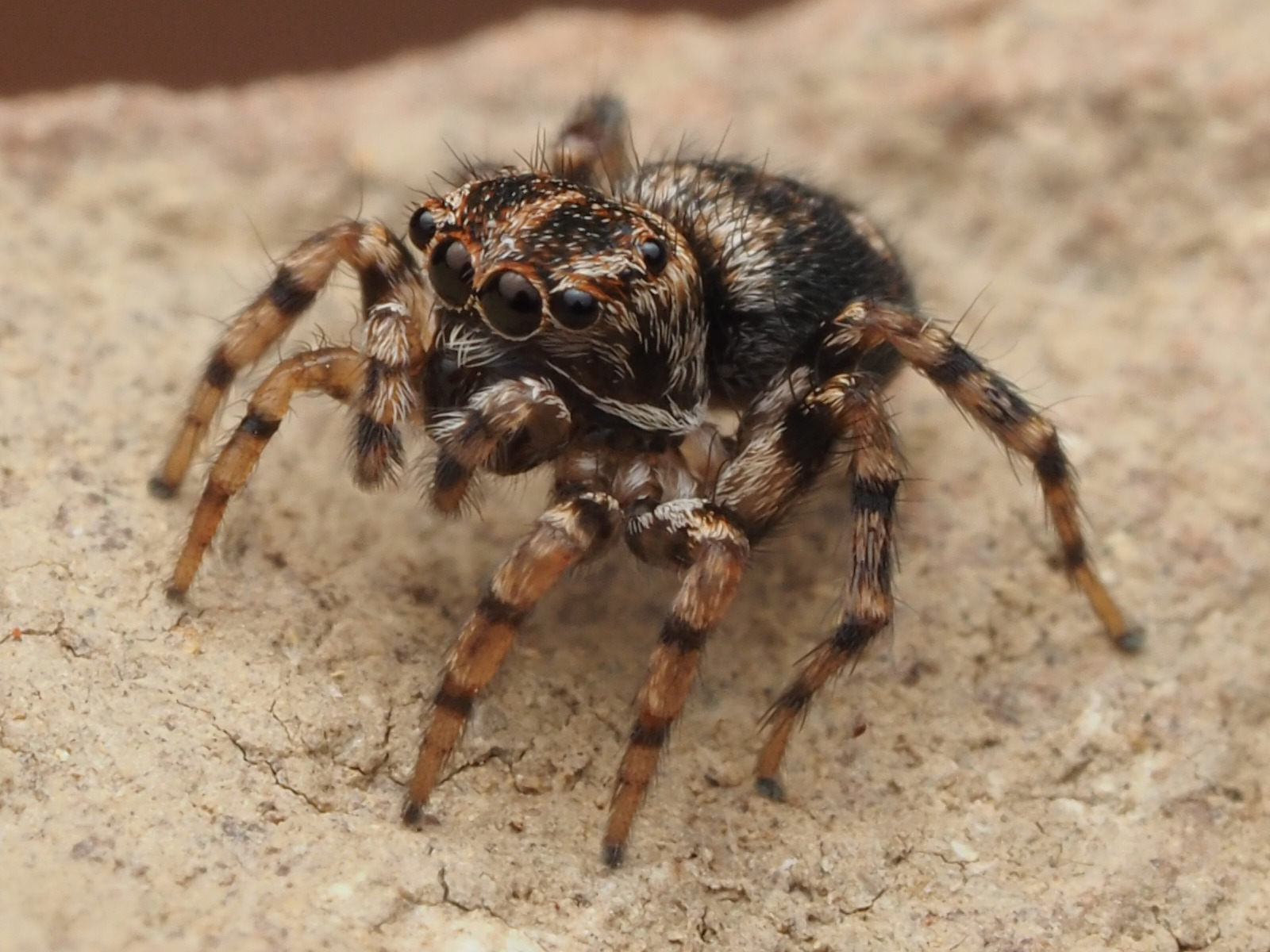
- female
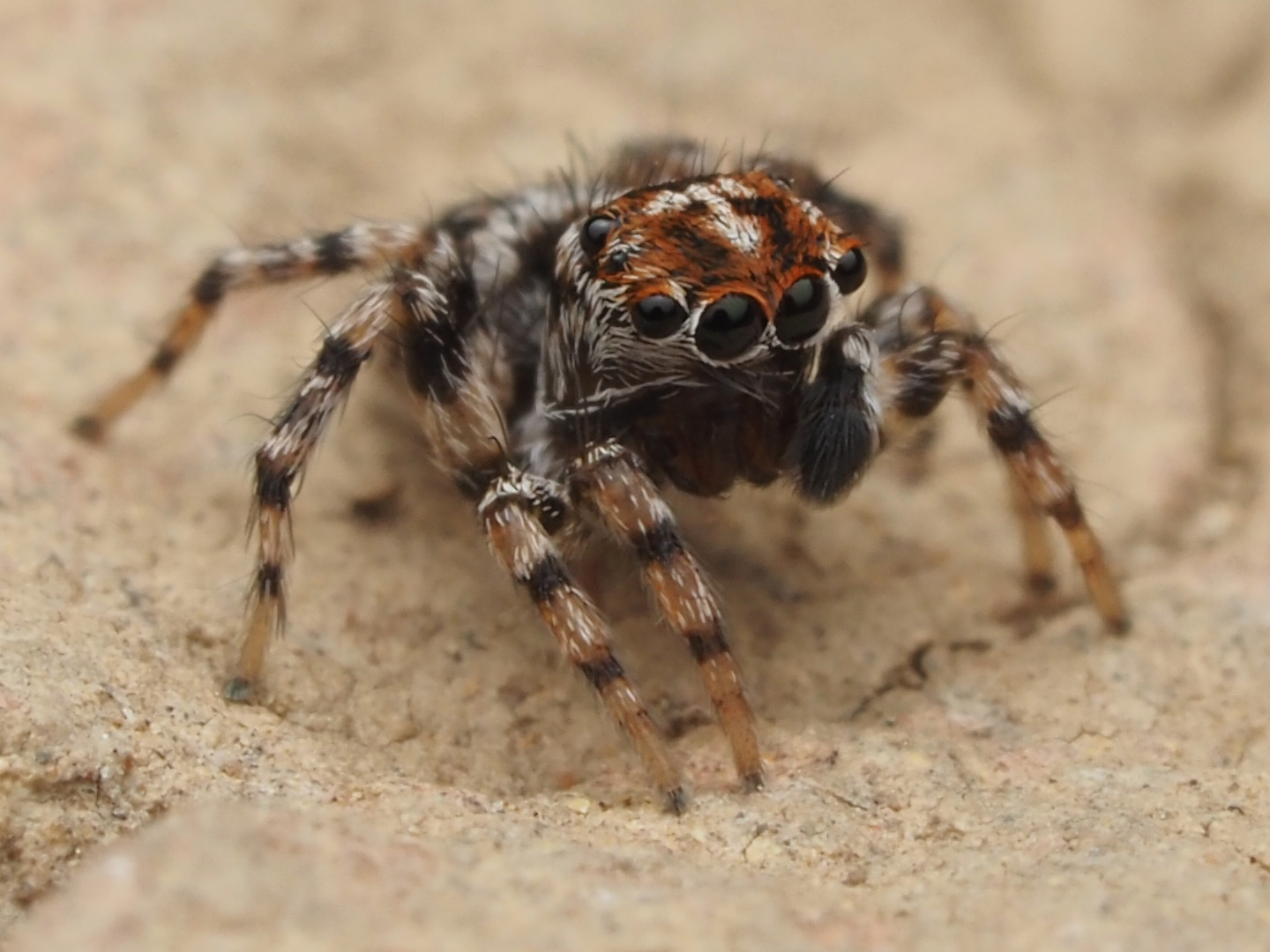
- male

Scientific classification
- Kingdom: Animalia
- Phylum: Arthropoda
- Subphylum: Chelicerata
- Class: Arachnida
- Order: Araneae
- Infraorder: Araneomorphae
- Family: Salticidae
- Genus: Naphrys
- Species: N. acerba

Binomial name
- Naphrys acerba (Peckham & Peckham, 1909)

= Naphrys acerba =

Species of spider

Naphrys acerba is a species of jumping spider in the family Salticidae. It is found in the United States (Texas and New Mexico) and northeastern Mexico.
