= Massagris mirifica =

Scientific classification
- Kingdom: Animalia
- Phylum: Arthropoda
- Subphylum: Chelicerata
- Class: Arachnida
- Order: Araneae
- Infraorder: Araneomorphae
- Family: Salticidae
- Genus: Massagris
- Species: M. mirifica

Binomial name
- Massagris mirifica Peckham & Peckham, 1903

Species of spider

Massagris mirifica is a jumping spider species in the genus Massagris that lives in South Africa. The male was first identified by George and Elizabeth Peckham in 1903.
