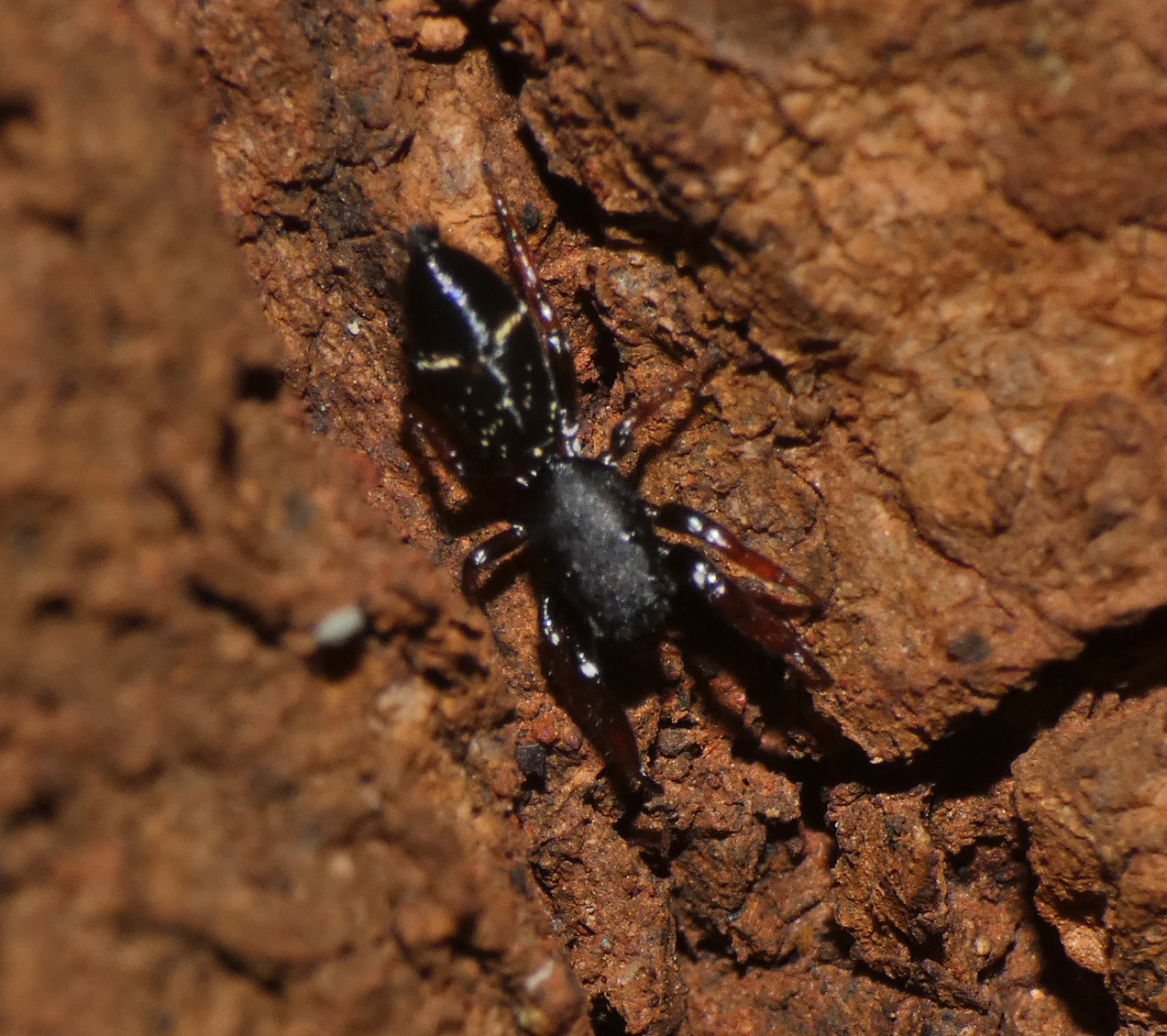
- H. georgius
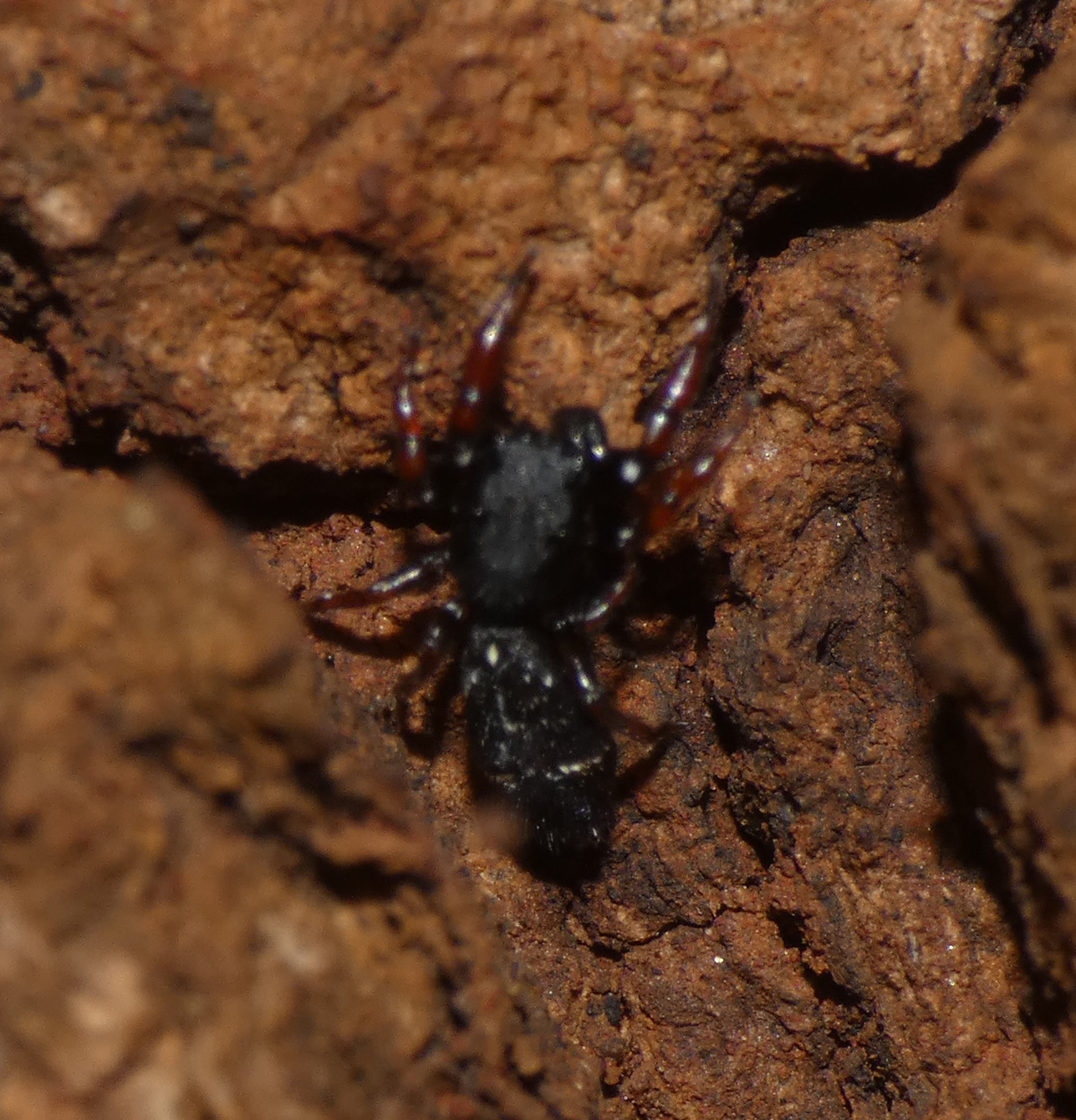
- H. georgius

Scientific classification
- Kingdom: Animalia
- Phylum: Arthropoda
- Subphylum: Chelicerata
- Class: Arachnida
- Order: Araneae
- Infraorder: Araneomorphae
- Family: Salticidae
- Subfamily: Hisponinae
- Genus: Hispo; Simon, 1885

Type species
- Hispo cingulata Simon, 1885

Species
- See text.

Diversity
- 9 species

= Hispo =

Genus of spiders

Hispo is a genus of the spider family Salticidae (jumping spiders).

Species of Hispo range in body length from 5 to 7 mm in females, and 3 to 4 in males.

== Distribution ==
Most species are found in Madagascar, with others found in Africa and the Seychelles. These parts were mostly connected during the time of Gondwana, or lie close.

== Species ==
As of October 2025, this genus includes nine species:

- Hispo alboclypea Wanless, 1981 – Seychelles
- Hispo cingulata Simon, 1886 – Madagascar (type species)
- Hispo frenata (Simon, 1900) – Madagascar
- Hispo georgius (G. W. Peckham & E. G. Peckham, 1892) – DR Congo, Kenya, Angola, Botswana, Zimbabwe, South Africa, Madagascar
- Hispo macfarlanei Wanless, 1981 – Madagascar
- Hispo pullata Wanless, 1981 – Madagascar
- Hispo striolata Simon, 1898 – Seychelles
- Hispo sulcata Wanless, 1981 – Madagascar
- Hispo tenuis Wanless, 1981 – Madagascar
