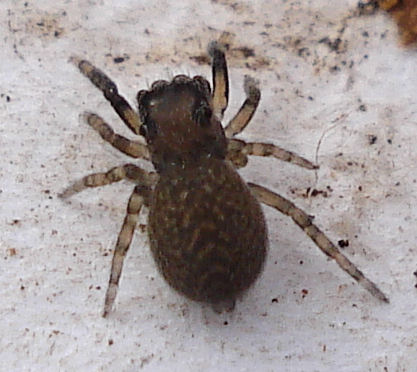

Scientific classification
- Kingdom: Animalia
- Phylum: Arthropoda
- Subphylum: Chelicerata
- Class: Arachnida
- Order: Araneae
- Infraorder: Araneomorphae
- Family: Salticidae
- Genus: Neon
- Species: N. reticulatus

Binomial name
- Neon reticulatus (Blackwall, 1853)

= Neon reticulatus =

Species of spider

Neon reticulatus is a species of jumping spider in the family Salticidae. It is found in North America, Europe, Turkey, Caucasus, a range from Russia (European to the Far East, Kazakhstan, Korea, and Japan.
