= Tomocyrba =

Scientific classification
- Kingdom: Animalia
- Phylum: Arthropoda
- Subphylum: Chelicerata
- Class: Arachnida
- Order: Araneae
- Infraorder: Araneomorphae
- Family: Salticidae
- Subfamily: Hisponinae
- Genus: Tomocyrba; Simon, 1900

Type species
- T. decollata Simon, 1900

Species
- 6, see text

Genus of spiders

Tomocyrba is a genus of jumping spiders that belongs to the subfamily Hisponinae. The genus is endemic to the island of Madagascar.

== Taxonomy ==
It was first described by Eugène Louis Simon in 1900 with two species from Antongil Bay near Maroantsetra. The genus was then revised on 2009 by Szűts & Scharff and expanded the list of species to six. In 2026, that list expanded to seven with the description of Tomocyrba ankihiberta by Pett & Murray.

=== Species ===
As of August 2019 it contains seven described species. They are listed below:

- Tomocyrba ankihiberta Pett BL & Murray KI, 2026
- Tomocyrba barbata Simon, 1900
- Tomocyrba berniae Szüts & Scharff, 2009
- Tomocyrba decollata Simon, 1900 (type species)
- Tomocyrba griswoldi Szüts & Scharff, 2009
- Tomocyrba thaleri Szüts & Scharff, 2009
- Tomocyrba ubicki Szüts & Scharff, 2009
