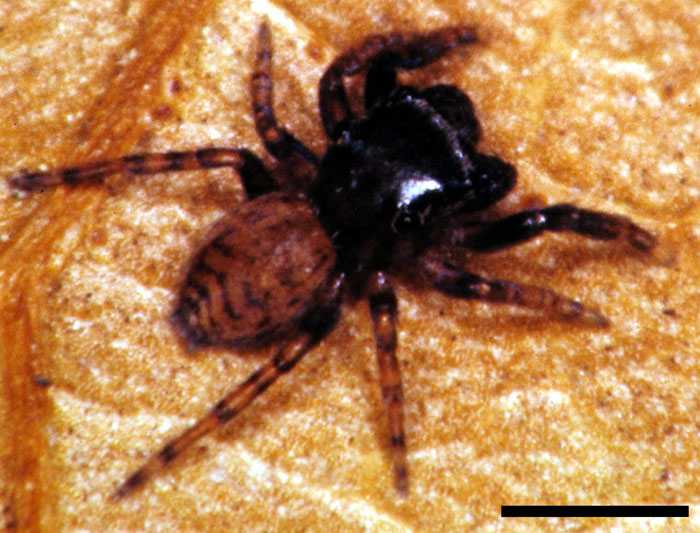
- Male Neon nelli

Scientific classification
- Kingdom: Animalia
- Phylum: Arthropoda
- Subphylum: Chelicerata
- Class: Arachnida
- Order: Araneae
- Infraorder: Araneomorphae
- Family: Salticidae
- Subfamily: Salticinae
- Genus: Neon; Simon, 1876

Type species
- Salticus reticulatus Blackwall, 1853

Diversity
- 27 species

= Neon (spider) =

Genus of spiders

Neon is a spider genus of the jumping spider family, Salticidae. Its described species occur mostly in Eurasia, with some species found in North and South America. One species, N. convolutus, is also found in Algeria. Two species are known from Australia, N. australis and N. taylori. N. australis has palp morphology and fringing on its first pair of legs very similar to that seen in N. nojimai Ikeda 1995, from Japan. N. taylori is most similar in morphology to N. sumatranus from Indonesia and N. kovblyuki from the Crimea and elsewhere. The genus is common and widespread in litter throughout Australia, from the highlands of Tasmania through the hot, dry inland to the wet tropics and includes many undescribed species.

Spiders in Neon are tiny to small, usually less than 5mm in body length. In the genus definition it says "Small unidentate spiders ranging from about 1.4 to 3.0mm in length." A precise definition of the genus was provided by Gertsch & Ivie (1955). Lohmander (1945) first established a subgenus Dicroneon for Neon levis (Simon). Neon reticulatus (Blackwall) and its relatives were assigned by Gertsch & Ivie to another subgenus, Neon.

The molecular phylogeny of the Salticidae developed by Maddison and co-workers places Neon in the Astioida and most closely related to the Australian-based Astiae radiation. It is possible as a consequence, that Neon is an originally Australian genus that has spread to other regions. However the only species of this genus sequenced (Maddison and Hedin 2003; Bodner and Maddison 2012), N. nelli, belongs within the subgenus Neon, unlike all the presently known Australian species that are more similar to members of the subgenus Dicroneon from the oriental region.

== Species ==
As of May 2016, the World Spider Catalog accepted the following species:

- Neon acoreensis Wunderlich, 2008 – Azores
- Neon australis Richardson, 2013 – South Australia
- Neon avalonus Gertsch & Ivie, 1955 – United States
- Neon caboverdensis Schmidt & Krause, 1998 – Cape Verde Islands
- Neon convolutus Denis, 1937 – Spain, France, Algeria
- Neon ellamae Gertsch & Ivie, 1955 – USA
- Neon kiyotoi Ikeda, 1995 – Japan
- Neon kovblyuki Logunov, 2004 – Ukraine
- Neon levis (Simon, 1871) – Palearctic
- Neon minutus Zabka, 1985 – Korea, Vietnam, Taiwan, Japan
- Neon muticus (Simon, 1871) – Corsica
- Neon nelli Peckham & Peckham, 1888 – USA, Canada
- Neon nigriceps Bryant, 1940 – Cuba
- Neon ningyo Ikeda, 1995 – China, Japan
- Neon nojimai Ikeda, 1995 – Japan
- Neon pictus Kulczynski, 1891 – Southeastern Europe to Central Asia
- Neon pixii Gertsch & Ivie, 1955 – USA
- Neon plutonus Gertsch & Ivie, 1955 – USA
- Neon punctulatus Karsch, 1880 – Bolivia
- Neon rayi (Simon, 1875) – Southern, Central Europe to Kazakhstan, Israel
- Neon reticulatus (Blackwall, 1853) (type species) – Holarctic
- Neon robustus Lohmander, 1945 – Western Europe
- Neon sumatranus Logunov, 1998 – Malaysia, Indonesia, New Guinea
- Neon taylori Richardson, 2013 – New South Wales, Victoria
- Neon valentulus Falconer, 1912 – Europe to Central Asia
- Neon wangi Peng & Li, 2006 – China
- Neon zonatus Bao & Peng, 2002 – Taiwan
