= Eupoinae =

Scientific classification
- Kingdom: Animalia
- Phylum: Arthropoda
- Subphylum: Chelicerata
- Class: Arachnida
- Order: Araneae
- Infraorder: Araneomorphae
- Family: Salticidae
- Subfamily: Eupoinae; Maddison, 2015

Genera
- See text.

Superfamily of spiders

Eupoinae is a subfamily of jumping spiders (family Salticidae). It was created in 2015 by Wayne Maddison. The subfamily has three genera.

== Genera ==
As of August 2020, the subfamily included three genera:

- Corusca Zhou & Li, 2013
- Eupoa Żabka, 1985
- Sinoinsula Zhou & Li, 2013
