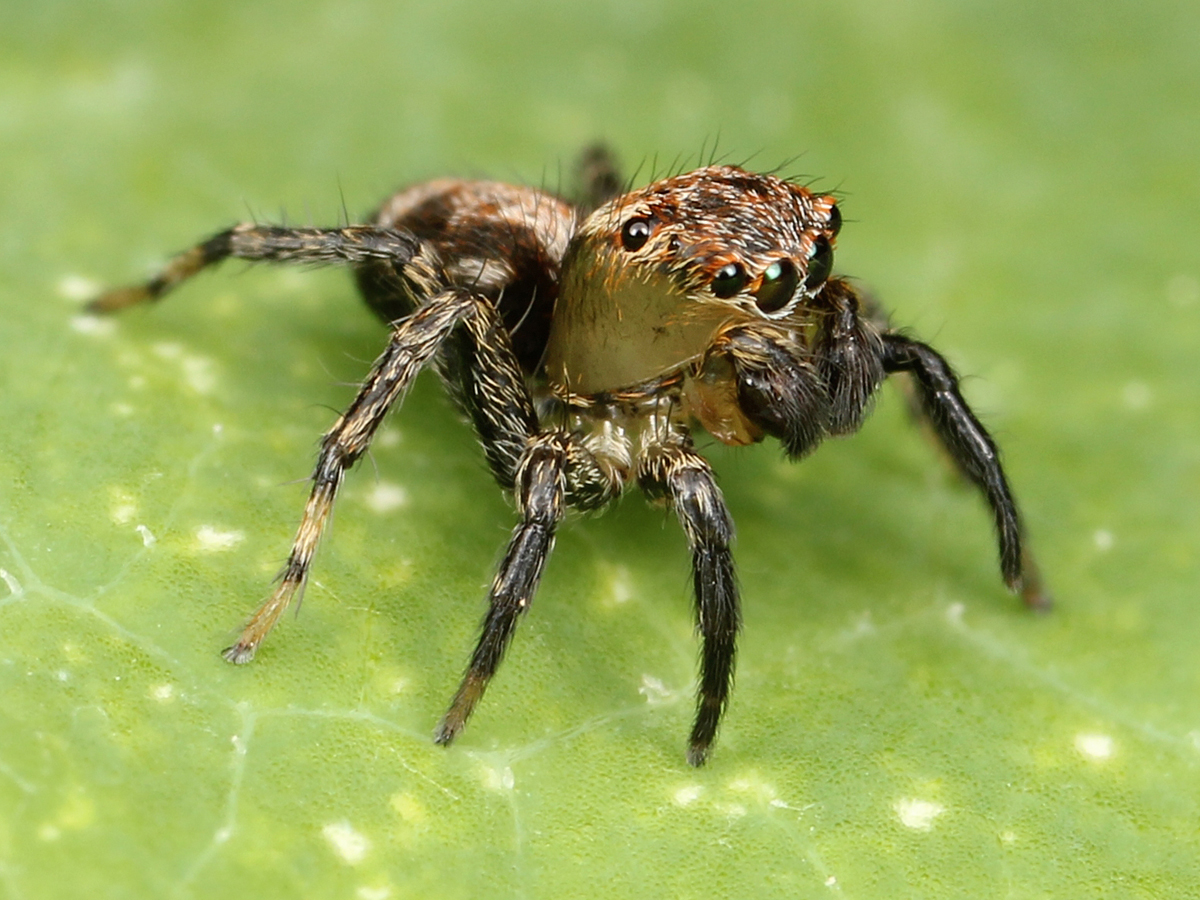
- Adult male Naphrys pulex, a member of the Salticoida clade

Scientific classification
- Kingdom: Animalia
- Phylum: Arthropoda
- Subphylum: Chelicerata
- Class: Arachnida
- Order: Araneae
- Infraorder: Araneomorphae
- Family: Salticidae
- Subfamily: Salticinae; Blackwall, 1841

Subgroups
- Amycoida Maddison & Hedin, 2003; Salticoida Maddison & Hedin, 2003

= Salticinae =

Subfamily of spiders

Salticinae is a subfamily of jumping spiders (family Salticidae). It includes over 90% of the known species of jumping spiders. The subfamily is divided into two unranked clades: Amycoida and Salticoida.

== Description ==
Members of the subfamily Salticinae have a number of features in common that distinguish them from the remaining salticids. Females lack a tarsal claw on the pedipalp. The palpal bulb of male basal salticids has a distinctive median apophysis, which is absent in the subfamily, and the cymbium is constricted at the tibial joint. Members also have a more complex tracheal system, which may be connected with their movements, which are more abrupt than other salticids, giving them a recognizable gait.

== Taxonomy ==
=== Phylogeny ===
The relationships among the basal salticids are not yet fully resolved; summary cladograms published in both 2014 and 2015 show unresolved branching for five basal subfamilies. However, Hisponinae is resolved as sister to Salticinae, which is the most derived subfamily.

- Salticidae
  - Onomastinae
  - Asemoneinae
  - Lyssomaninae
  - Spartaeinae
  - Eupoinae
  - - Hisponinae
    - - Salticinae
        - Amycoida
        - Salticoida

=== Classification ===
In 2015, Wayne Maddison divided the subfamily into 27 tribes with a total of about 540 extant genera. The tribes were grouped into a number of clades.

Subfamily Salticinae

clade Amycoida – 9 tribes
clade Salticoida – 18 tribes in total, most grouped into three subclades:

basal – 2 tribes
Astioida – 5 tribes
Marpissoida – 3 tribes
Saltafresia – 8 tribes
