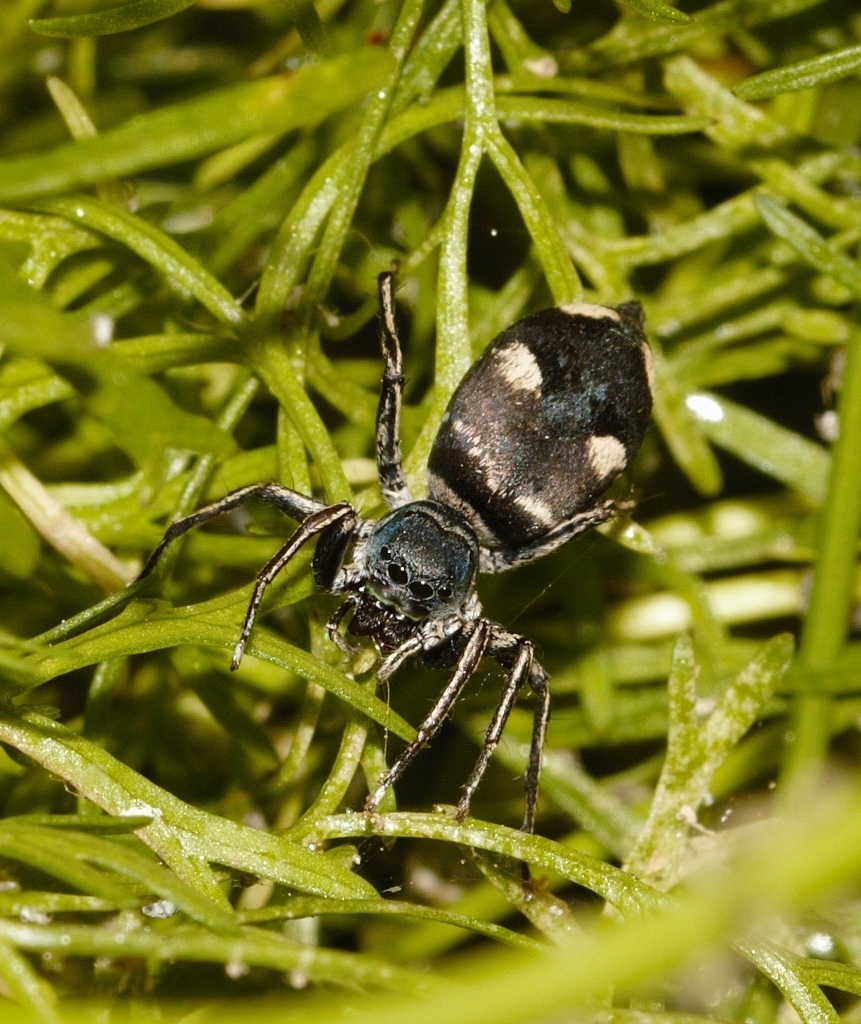
- A related species, Mexcala quadrimaculata

Scientific classification
- Kingdom: Animalia
- Phylum: Arthropoda
- Subphylum: Chelicerata
- Class: Arachnida
- Order: Araneae
- Infraorder: Araneomorphae
- Family: Salticidae
- Genus: Mexcala
- Species: M. namibica

Binomial name
- Mexcala namibica Wesołowska, 2009

= Mexcala namibica =

Species of spider

Mexcala namibica is a species of jumping spider in the genus Mexcala that is endemic to Namibia, after which it is named. The spider was first defined in 2009 by Wanda Wesołowska, one of over 500 that the arachnologist described during her career. It mimics ants, living alongside and preying upon them, particularly Camponotus detritus. Only the male has been described. It is a medium-sized spider, with ablackish carapace typically 3.3 mm (0.13 in) long and a reddish-orange abdomen typically 4.1 mm (0.16 in) long. It is similar to others in the genus, but can be distinguished by the dark pattern on its abdomen, consisting of a stripe to the front, two patches in the middle and black chevrons at the back.

== Taxonomy ==
Mexcala namibica is a jumping spider that was first described by the Polish arachnologist Wanda Wesołowska in 2009, one of over 500 species she identified during her career. She allocated the species to the genus Mexcala, first raised by George and Elizabeth Peckham in 1902 as part of a thorough revision of the genus. The genus was a member of the tribe Heliophaninae alongside Pseudicius and Cosmophasis, which was absorbed into Chrysillini by Wayne Maddison in 2015. The tribe is a member of the clade Saltafresia within the subfamily Salticoida. A year later, in 2016, Jerzy Prószyński allocated the genus to the Heliophanines group of genera, which was named after the genus Heliophanus. The genera share characteristics, including having a rather uniform, mainly dark appearance. The species is named after the country where it was first discovered.

== Description ==
Like all Mexcala spiders, the species is slender and medium-sized. The female has a blackish carapace that has a covering of brown hairs and is typically 3.3 mm (0.13 in) long. The chelicerae is bristly and has a single tooth. The remaining mouthparts and sternum are dark brown. The abdomen is reddish-orange with a black band crossing near the front, two dark patches in the middle and black chevrons to the rear. It is typically 4.1 mm (0.16 in) long and 2.2 mm (0.087 in) wide. The underside is dark. It has long thin brown legs. The pedipalps are brown. The palpal bulb is similar to Mexcala elegans and Mexcala rufa. It can be distinguished by the pattern on its abdomen. The embolus is fixed to the tegulum. The female has not been described.

== Behaviour ==
Like many jumping spiders, Wesołowska and Tamás Szűts noted that Mexcala spiders mimic ants, particularly members of the Camponotus genus. The spiders live amongst various different species of ant that it mimics, and preys upon. It has been noted to eat Camponotus detritus. Like other jumping spiders, it is mainly a diurnal hunter that uses its good eyesight to spot its prey. It attacks from the front and captures its prey behind the head. It uses visual displays during courtship and transmits vibratory signals through silk to communicate to other spiders.

== Distribution ==
Mexcala spiders can be found across Africa and the Arabian peninsula. Mexcala namibica is endemic to Namibia. The species was first discovered near Gobabab, the holotype being collected in 1986.
