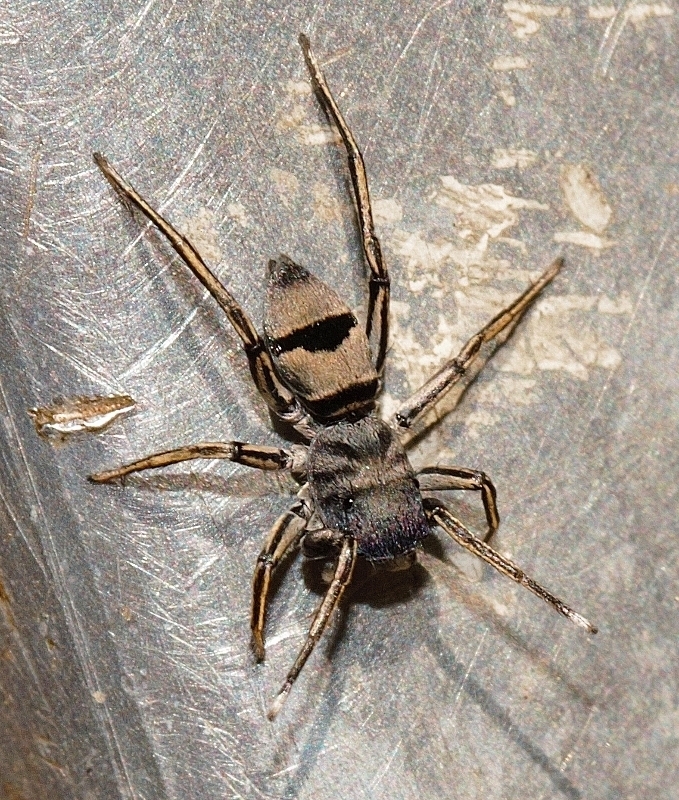
- A spider of the Mexcala genus

Scientific classification
- Kingdom: Animalia
- Phylum: Arthropoda
- Subphylum: Chelicerata
- Class: Arachnida
- Order: Araneae
- Infraorder: Araneomorphae
- Family: Salticidae
- Genus: Mexcala
- Species: M. formosa

Binomial name
- Mexcala formosa Wesołowska & Tomasiewicz, 2008

= Mexcala formosa =

Species of spider

Mexcala formosa is a species of jumping spider in the genus Mexcala that is endemic to Ethiopia. The spider was first defined in 2008 by Wanda Wesołowska and . It mimics ants, living alongside and preying upon them. Only the male has been described. It is a medium-sized spider, with a cephalothorax typically 2.9 mm (0.11 in) long and an abdomen typically 3.5 mm (0.14 in) long. The carapace is dark brown and the eye field black. The spider is similar to the related Mexcala agilis and Mexcala elegans, but can be distinguished by its thinner tibial apophysis and the white scales on its cymbium.

== Taxonomy ==
Mexcala formosa is a jumping spider that was first described by the Polish arachnologists Wanda Wesołowska and Beata Tomasiewicz in 2008. They allocated the species to the genus Mexcala, first raised by George and Elizabeth Peckham in 1902. The genus was a member of the tribe Heliophaninae alongside Pseudicius and Cosmophasis, which was absorbed into Chrysillini by Wayne Maddison in 2015. The tribe is a member of the clade Saltafresia within the subfamily Salticoida. A year later, in 2016, Jerzy Prószyński allocated the genus to the Heliophanines group of genera, which was named after the genus Heliophanus. The genera share characteristics, including having a rather uniform, mainly dark appearance. The species is named after a Latin word meaning shaped like a well and refers to the spider's body shape.

== Description ==
Like all Mexcala spiders, the species is slender and medium-sized. The male has a cephalothorax with a typical length of 2.9 mm (0.11 in) and width 2.0 mm (0.079 in). The spider has a dark brown pear-shaped carapace with a dark line running along its edges. The black eye field has a scattering of brown bristles. It has a low, dark clypeus. The chelicerae are long with very short spike-like bristles. The remaining mouthparts and sternum are dark brown. The abdomen is brownish with an indistinct pattern of dark patches in the centre. It is typically 3.5 mm (0.14 in) long and 1.7 mm (0.067 in) wide. The underside is yellow with a tint of grey. The spinnerets are brownish. It has long thin brown legs. The pedipalps are brown with some white scales visible on the surface of the cymbium. It has a straight tibial apophysis, or spike, that has a wider base than other species. The palpal bulb is triangular in form with a large lobe to the back. The embolus is short and slightly bent. It is fixed to the tegulum.

The spider is similar to others in the genus. It is related to Mexcala agilis and Mexcala elegans, but can be distinguished by its thinner tibial apophysis and the white scales that can be seen on the cymbium. The female has not been described.

== Behaviour ==
Like many jumping spiders, Wesołowska and Tamás Szűts noted that Mexcala spiders mimic ants, particularly members of the Camponotus genus. The spiders live amongst the species of ant that it mimics, and preys upon. Like other jumping spiders, it is mainly a diurnal hunter that uses its good eyesight to spot its prey. It attacks from the front and captures its prey behind the head. It uses visual displays during courtship and transmits vibratory signals through silk to communicate to other spiders.

== Distribution ==
Mexcala spiders can be found across Africa and the Arabian peninsula. Mexcala formosa is endemic to Ethiopia. The species was first discovered in the Awash National Park, the holotype being collected in 1988. The spider lives in grass and gravel.
