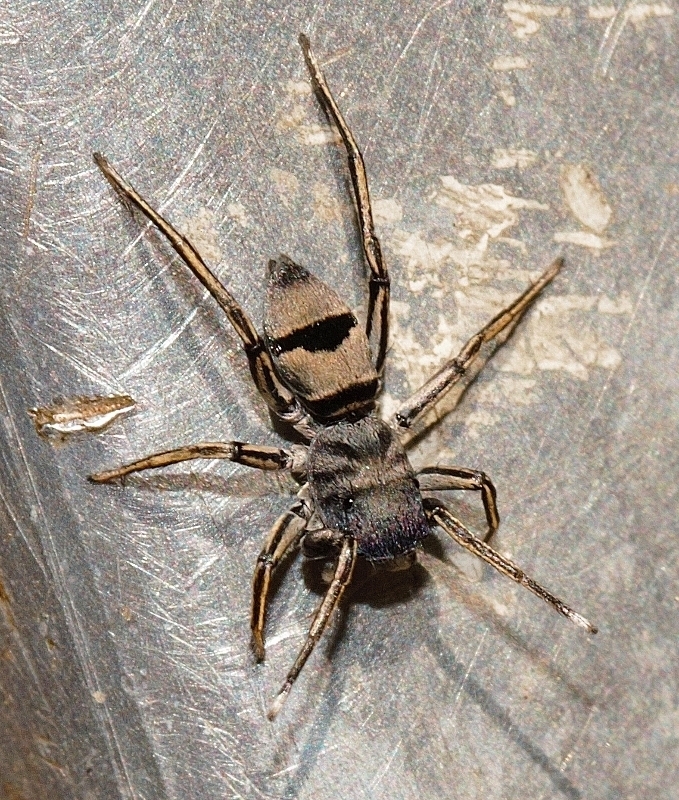
- The related species Mexcala elegans

Scientific classification
- Kingdom: Animalia
- Phylum: Arthropoda
- Subphylum: Chelicerata
- Class: Arachnida
- Order: Araneae
- Infraorder: Araneomorphae
- Family: Salticidae
- Genus: Mexcala
- Species: M. monstrata

Binomial name
- Mexcala monstrata Wesołowska & van Harten, 1994

= Mexcala monstrata =

Species of spider

Mexcala monstrata is a species of jumping spider in the genus Mexcala that lives in Egypt and Yemen. The spider was first defined in 1994 by Wanda Wesołowska and Antonius van Harten. It mimics ants, living alongside and preying upon them. It is a medium-sized spider, with a dark brown carapace that range between 2.8 and 3.6 mm (0.11 and 0.14 in) long and an orange abdomen between 3.0 and 5.8 mm (0.12 and 0.23 in) long. The female is larger than the male. Juveniles have also been found that have a carapace that measures between 2.46 and 2.82 mm (0.097 and 0.111 in) in length and an abdomen that is between 2.13 and 2.4 mm (0.084 and 0.094 in) in length. The abdomen in all cases has a dark stripe across the middle, although the male's is thinner. The spider is similar to the related Mexcala agilis and Mexcala elegans, but can be distinguished by the wider tibial apophysis on the male palpal bulb and the presence of two heavily sclerotised shallow depressions in the female epigyne.

== Taxonomy ==
Mexcala monstrata is a jumping spider that was first described by Wanda Wesołowska and Antonius van Harten in 1994. It is one of over 500 species identified by the Polish arachnologist Wesołowska during her career. They allocated the species to the genus Mexcala, first raised by George and Elizabeth Peckham in 1902. The genus was a member of the tribe Heliophaninae alongside Pseudicius and Cosmophasis, which was absorbed into Chrysillini by Wayne Maddison in 2015. The tribe is a member of the clade Saltafresia within the subfamily Salticoida. A year later, in 2016, Jerzy Prószyński allocated the genus to the Heliophanines group of genera, which was named after the genus Heliophanus. The genera share characteristics, including having a rather uniform, mainly dark appearance.

== Description ==
Like all Mexcala spiders, the species is slender and medium-sized. The male has a dark brown pear-shaped carapace that is between 2.8 and 3.5 mm (0.11 and 0.14 in) long and between 2.0 and 2.1 mm (0.079 and 0.083 in) wide. It has a covering of delicate short hairs. The eye field has long brown bristles. The chelicerae are long with short thick spike-like bristles. The remaining mouthparts and sternum are dark brown. The abdomen is elongated with a pointy end and between 3.0 and 3.5 mm (0.12 and 0.14 in) long and between 1.7 and 2.1 mm (0.067 and 0.083 in) wide. It is orange with a stripe across the middle and brown edges, and covered with dense short scale-like hairs that seem to cling to the body. Sometimes the very back is black. The underside is yellow with a hint of grey. The spinnerets are orange-brown. It has very long thin brown legs covered in long spines and dark hairs, some of which are shiny. The pedipalps are brown. The palpal bulb is pear-shaped. The tibial apophysis, or appendage, is short and thick, with a distinctive sharp tip. The embolus is short and slightly curved. It is fixed to the tegulum.

The female is generally similar but larger than the male. Ii has a carapace that is typically between 2.9 and 3.6 mm (0.11 and 0.14 in) long and between 2.1 and 2.5 mm (0.083 and 0.098 in) wide, and an abdomen that is between 3.9 and 5.8 mm (0.15 and 0.23 in) long and 2.6 and 3.7 mm (0.10 and 0.15 in) wide. The carapace is similar to the male but is often darker. The chelicerae are dark brown with a fine saw-like edge and a single tooth to the front and a single tooth to the rear. The abdomen has a slightly different pattern, with a wider stripe that stretches towards the front of the orange area and dividing it into two large orange patches. The end of abdomen is black and the underside dark. The pedipalps are brownish-orange. The oval epigyne is heavily sclerotised and has two shallow depressions plugged with a waxy secretion and ridged with round grooves. Two copulatory openings lead via relatively short but complicated seminal ducts to medium-sized receptacles.

Juveniles are smaller than males, with a total length between 4.58 and 5.22 mm (0.180 and 0.206 in), a carapace that measures between 2.46 and 2.82 mm (0.097 and 0.111 in) long and 1.63 and 1.91 mm (0.064 and 0.075 in) wide and an abdomen that is between 2.13 and 2.4 mm (0.084 and 0.094 in) in length and 1.74 and 1.99 mm (0.069 and 0.078 in) in width. They are similar in shape and design to the adult. The spider is similar to others in the genus. It is related to Mexcala elegans, but the male can be distinguished by its wider tibial apophysis. The male can also be differentiated from Mexcala agilis by way its tibial apophysis has an abruptly pointed tip in comparison to the gently narrowing end of the other species. The visible round epigynal depressions are a distinguishing feature of the female.

== Behaviour ==
Like many jumping spiders, Wesołowska and Tamás Szűts noted that Mexcala spiders mimic ants, particularly female members of the Camponotus genus. It most likely mimics Camponotus sericeus . The spider lives amongst the ants that it mimics, and preys upon. Like other jumping spiders, it is mainly a diurnal hunter that uses its good eyesight to spot its prey. It attacks from the front and captures its prey behind the head. It uses visual displays during courtship and transmits vibratory signals through silk to communicate to other spiders.

== Distribution ==
Mexcala spiders can be found across Africa and the Arabian peninsula. Mexcala monstrata lives in Egypt and Yemen. The holotype was discovered in the Al Batinah Region of Yemen. The spider was first seen in Manakhah District in 2002. Examples have also been found in other areas of the country, including Al Mahwit Governorate, Dhamar Governorate, Sanaa Governorate Taiz Governorate. The first example from Egypt was found in 2016 in a peach and pomegranate orchard within Al-Azhar University.
