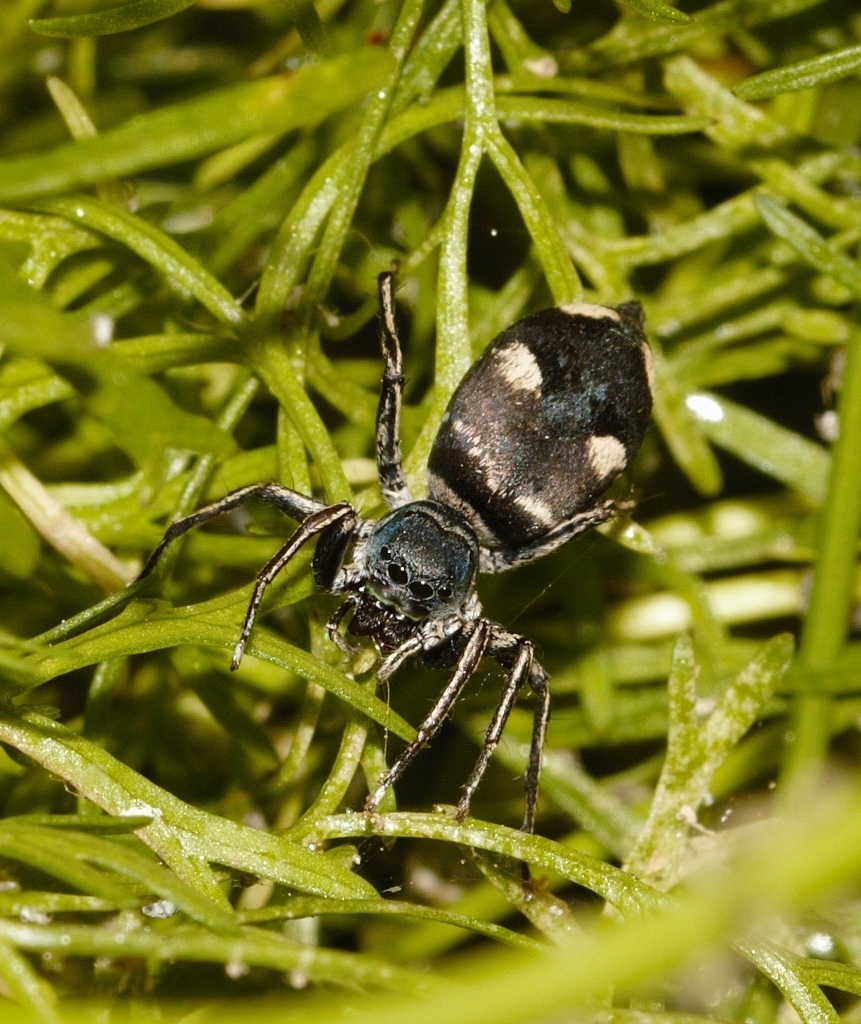
- A related species, Mexcala quadrimaculata

Scientific classification
- Kingdom: Animalia
- Phylum: Arthropoda
- Subphylum: Chelicerata
- Class: Arachnida
- Order: Araneae
- Infraorder: Araneomorphae
- Family: Salticidae
- Genus: Mexcala
- Species: M. angolensis

Binomial name
- Mexcala angolensis Wesołowska, 2009

= Mexcala angolensis =

Species of spider

Mexcala angolensis is a species of jumping spider in the genus Mexcala that is endemic to Angola, after which it is named. The spider was first defined in 2009 by Wanda Wesołowska, one of over 500 that the arachnologist described during her career. The spider is medium-sized, with a brownish carapace typically 3.4 mm (0.13 in) long and a light brown abdomen typically 3.0 mm (0.12 in) long that has an indistinct dark streak that runs down the middle. It mimics ants and ant-like wasps, living alongside and preying upon them. The male can be distinguished from other Mexcala species by the small teeth at the end of its tibial apophysis, or spike, and the lack of a bump on its palpal bulb. The female has not been described.

== Taxonomy ==
Mexcala angolensis is a jumping spider that was first described by the Polish arachnologist Wanda Wesołowska in 2009, one of over 500 species she identified during her career. She allocated the species to the genus Mexcala, first raised by George and Elizabeth Peckham in 1902 as part of a thorough revision of the genus. The genus was a member of the tribe Heliophaninae alongside Pseudicius and Cosmophasis, which was absorbed into Chrysillini by Wayne Maddison in 2015. The tribe is a member of the clade Saltafresia within the subfamily Salticoida. A year later, in 2016, Jerzy Prószyński allocated the genus to the Heliophanines group of genera, which was named after the genus Heliophanus. The genera share characteristics, including having a rather uniform, mainly dark appearance. The species itself has a name that is derived from the country where it was first found.

== Description ==
Like all Mexcala spiders, the species is slender and medium-sized. The male is covered with short brown hairs. a brownish carapace that is typically 3.4 mm (0.13 in) long. It has a short eye field. The chelicerae have a single tooth. The abdomen is typically 3.0 mm (0.12 in) long and light brown with two lighter patches to the front and an indistinct dark streak down the middle. The underside has sets of yellowish dots forming four lines. The long thin legs are brown with black lines. The pedipalps are brown with white scales on the tibia and cymbium and a rounded palpal bulb. There is a single tibial apophysis, or spike, with small teeth on its tip. This tip, along with the lack of a bump on the palpal bulb, help distinguish the species from others in the genus. The embolus is fixed to the tegulum. The female has not been described.

Like many jumping spiders, Wesołowska and Tamás Szűts noted that Mexcala spiders mimic ants. Some are particularly similar to members of the Camponotus genus. However, they mainly resemble Mutillidae, species of wasp that have ant-like characteristics. The species particularly resembles the female, which is wingless, in its body proportions.

== Behaviour ==
The spider is typical of the genus. It lives amongst various different species of ant and ant-like insect that it mimics, and preys upon. Like other jumping spiders, it is a mainly diurnal hunter that uses its good eyesight to spot its prey. It attacks from the front and captures its prey behind the head. The chelicerae have short thick spines on them that may be used for digging holes to act as underground hiding places. It uses visual displays during courtship and transmits vibratory signals through silk to communicate to other spiders.

== Distribution and habitat ==
Mexcala spiders can be found across Africa and the Arabian peninsula. Mexcala angolensis is endemic to Angola in Southern Africa. The holotype was found near Muconda in 1949.
