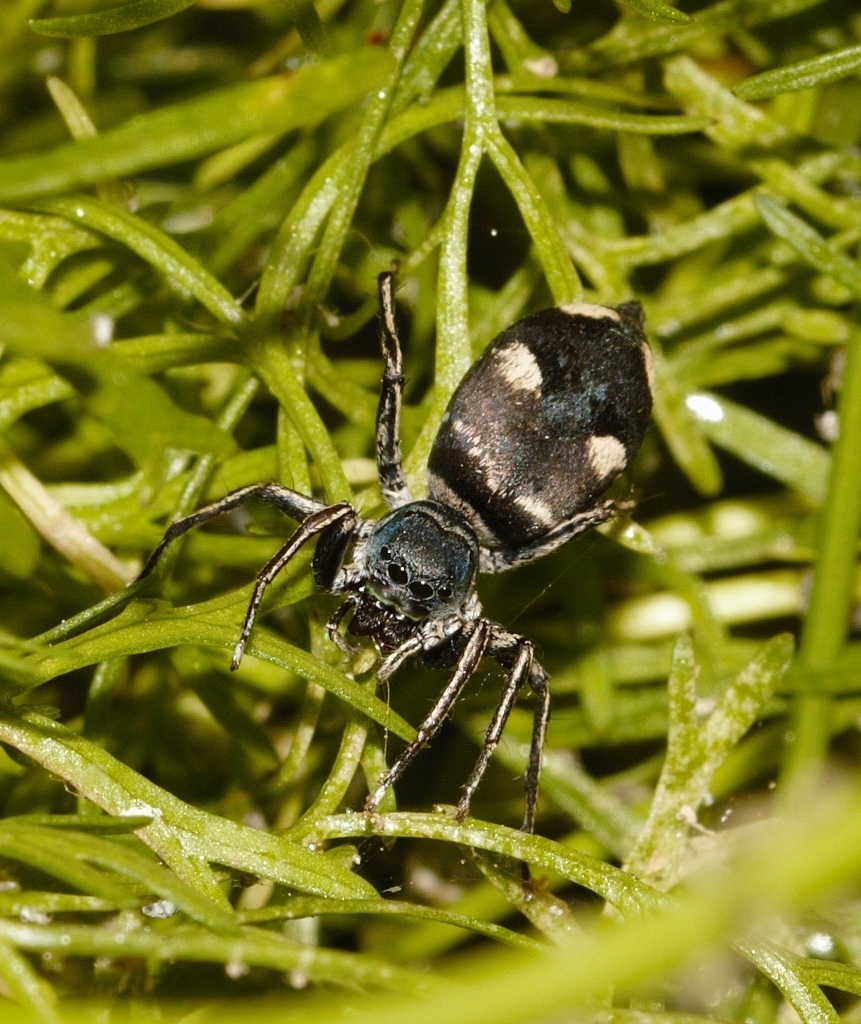
- A related species, Mexcala quadrimaculata

Scientific classification
- Kingdom: Animalia
- Phylum: Arthropoda
- Subphylum: Chelicerata
- Class: Arachnida
- Order: Araneae
- Infraorder: Araneomorphae
- Family: Salticidae
- Genus: Mexcala
- Species: M. smaragdina

Binomial name
- Mexcala smaragdina Wesołowska & Edwards, 2012

= Mexcala smaragdina =

Species of spider

Mexcala smaragdina is a species of jumping spider in the genus Mexcala that is endemic to Nigeria. The spider was first defined in 2012 by Wanda Wesołowska and G. B. Edwards. Spiders of the genus mimic ants and ant-like wasps, living alongside and preying upon them. The spider is medium-sized, with a cephalothorax typically 2.5 mm (0.098 in) long and an abdomen 2.7 mm (0.11 in) long. The male has a hooked embolus that is shorter than the related Mexcala caerulea but otherwise the male copulatory organs are similar. The female has not been identified. The spider is most easily distinguished by the green-metallic sheen on its body, which is referred to in the species name.

== Taxonomy ==
Mexcala smaragdina is a jumping spider that was first described by the arachnologists Wanda Wesołowska and Glavis B. Edwards in 2012. They allocated the species to the genus Mexcala, first raised by George and Elizabeth Peckham in 1902. The genus was a member of the tribe Heliophaninae alongside Pseudicius and Cosmophasis, which was absorbed into Chrysillini by Wayne Maddison in 2015. The tribe is a member of the clade Saltafresia within the subfamily Salticoida. A year later, in 2016, Jerzy Prószyński allocated the genus to the Heliophanines group of genera, which was named after the genus Heliophanus. The genera share characteristics, including having a rather uniform, mainly dark appearance.

== Description ==
Like all Mexcala spiders, the species is slender and medium-sized. The male has a cephalothorax that is typically 2.5 mm (0.098 in) long and typically 1.8 mm (0.071 in) wide. The medium-high carapace is dark brown and covered in short delicate hairs that have an intense green-metallic shine. The eye field is black with long bristles near the eyes. The clypeus is dark and very low. The chelicerae have short spiky bristles. The spider has a black labium and sternum. The abdomen is typically 2.7 mm (0.11 in) long and typically 1.7 mm (0.067 in) wide. It is ovoid and shiny black, clothed in dark hairs that, like those covering the carapace, have a greenish golden shine. The underside is dark. The spinnerets are dark grey. The spider has long thin legs, the front ones generally black and the rearmost brown. The pedipalps are bulbous and the palpal bulb oval. The spider has a wide tibial apophysis that has a curved end. The embolus is shaped like a hook and fixed to the tegulum. The copulatory organs are similar to Mexcala caerulea, but the embolus is shorter. The spider is otherwise most easily identified compared to others in the genus by the greenish shine on its body, after which it is named. The female has not been described.

== Behaviour ==
Like many jumping spiders, Wesołowska and Tamás Szűts noted that Mexcala spiders mimic ants. The spiders live amongst the species of ant and ant-like wasps that it mimics. Like other jumping spiders, they are mainly a diurnal hunter that uses their good eyesight to spot their prey. The spider attacks from the front and captures its prey behind the head. It uses visual displays during courtship and transmits vibratory signals through silk to communicate to other spiders. The bristles on the chelicerae may be used for digging holes to act as underground hiding places.

== Distribution ==
Mexcala spiders can be found across Africa and the Arabian peninsula. Mexcala smaragdina is endemic to Nigeria. The holotype was found near Calabar in Cross River State in 1984.
