= Mexcala macilenta =

Scientific classification
- Kingdom: Animalia
- Phylum: Arthropoda
- Subphylum: Chelicerata
- Class: Arachnida
- Order: Araneae
- Infraorder: Araneomorphae
- Family: Salticidae
- Genus: Mexcala
- Species: M. macilenta

Binomial name
- Mexcala macilenta Wesołowska & Russell-Smith, 2000

Species of spider

Mexcala macilenta is a species of jumping spider in the genus Mexcala that lives in Ethiopia and Tanzania. The spider was first defined in 2000 by Wanda Wesołowska and Anthony Russell-Smith. It mimics ants and ant-like wasps, living alongside and preying upon them. The spider is medium-sized to large, with a brown carapace between 3.2 and 3.4 mm (0.13 and 0.13 in) long and a rusty-brown or greyish-russet abdomen between 3.2 and 5.5 mm (0.13 and 0.22 in) long. The female is larger than the male. Both male and females have long thin brown legs and a distinctive pattern of a large triangular black marking in the middle of the abdomen. The male copulatory organs have a thin tibial apophysis and lack the triangular lobe on the palpal bulb that other species in the genus possess.

== Taxonomy ==
Mexcala macilenta is a jumping spider, a member of the family Salticidae, that was first described by the arachnologists Wanda Wesołowska and Anthony Russell-Smith in 2000. They allocated the species to the genus Mexcala, first raised by George and Elizabeth Peckham in 1902. The genus was a member of the tribe Heliophaninae alongside Pseudicius and Cosmophasis, which was absorbed into Chrysillini by Wayne Maddison in 2015. The tribe is a member of the clade Saltafresia within the subfamily Salticoida. A year later, in 2016, Jerzy Prószyński allocated the genus to the Heliophanines group of genera, which was named after the genus Heliophanus. The genera share characteristics, including having a rather uniform, mainly dark appearance. The specific name is derived from the Latin word meaning 'lean' or 'thin'.

== Description ==
Like all Mexcala spiders, the species is slender and medium-sized to large. The male has a dark brown carapace that is typically 3.2 mm (0.13 in) in length and 2.0 mm (0.079 in) in width. There is a pattern made up of wide rusty brown streak in the middle. It has a short black eye field that has a dusting of brown bristles. The chelicerae are brown with a serrated front edge and a single tooth to the rear. The labium and sternum are dark brown. The oval hairy abdomen is typically. 3.4 mm (0.13 in) in length and 1.8 mm (0.071 in) in width. It is generally rusty-brown with black edging and a distinctive large black pattern shaped like a triangle in the middle. Some examples have three black bands crossing the abdomen. The underside is blackish. The spider has dark spinnerets and very long brown legs covered in brown hairs and spines. The pedipalp has a thin tibial apophysis. The embolus is fixed to the tegulum. It lacks the triangular lobe on the palpal bulb that other species in the genus possess.

The female is larger than the male. It has a carapace that is typically 3.4 mm (0.13 in) long and 22 mm (0.87 in) wide. It is oval and brown with a lighter short eye field that is covered with short thick bristles. The eyes have black surrounds. The clypeus is low, the chelicerae dark brown with short thick spines. The labium and sternum are brown. The oval abdomen is a greyish-russet with white scales forming a fringe on the dark triangular pattern. Typically 5.5 mm (0.22 in) long and 3.1 mm (0.12 in) wide, the abdomen is clothed in delicate short colourless hairs interspersed with occasional brown bristles and long dark hairs on the edges. Two diagonal white lines cross the edge, running into the dark grey underside. The spinnerets are dark and the legs are similar to the male. The sclerotised epigyne has a large central depression. The copulatory openings lead to straight thick-walled seminal ducts and spherical receptacles. It has very small accessory glands.

== Behaviour ==
Like many jumping spiders, Wesołowska and Tamás Szűts noted that Mexcala spiders mimic ants. Some are particularly similar to members of the Camponotus genus. However, they mainly resemble Mutillidae, species of wasp that have ant-like characteristics. The species particularly resembles the female, which is wingless, in its body proportions. The spiders live amongst the species of ant and ant-like insect that they mimic, and preys upon.

Like other jumping spiders, Mexcala macilenta is mainly a diurnal hunter that uses its good eyesight to spot its prey. It attacks from the front and captures its prey behind the head. It uses visual displays during courtship and transmits vibratory signals through silk to communicate to other spiders. The spines on the spider's chelicerae may be used for digging holes to act as underground hiding places.

== Distribution and habitat ==
Mexcala spiders can be found across Africa and the Arabian peninsula. Mexcala macilenta lives in Ethiopia and Tanzania. The female holotype comes from Mkomazi National Park in Tanzania, and was found in 1995 living on a hillside containing Acacia and Commiphora species. Male specimens were found at the same site. The first example to be identified in Ethiopia was a female discovered in 1988 in Sidamo Province living in a valley amongst Acacia trees. The species prefers shrubland,
