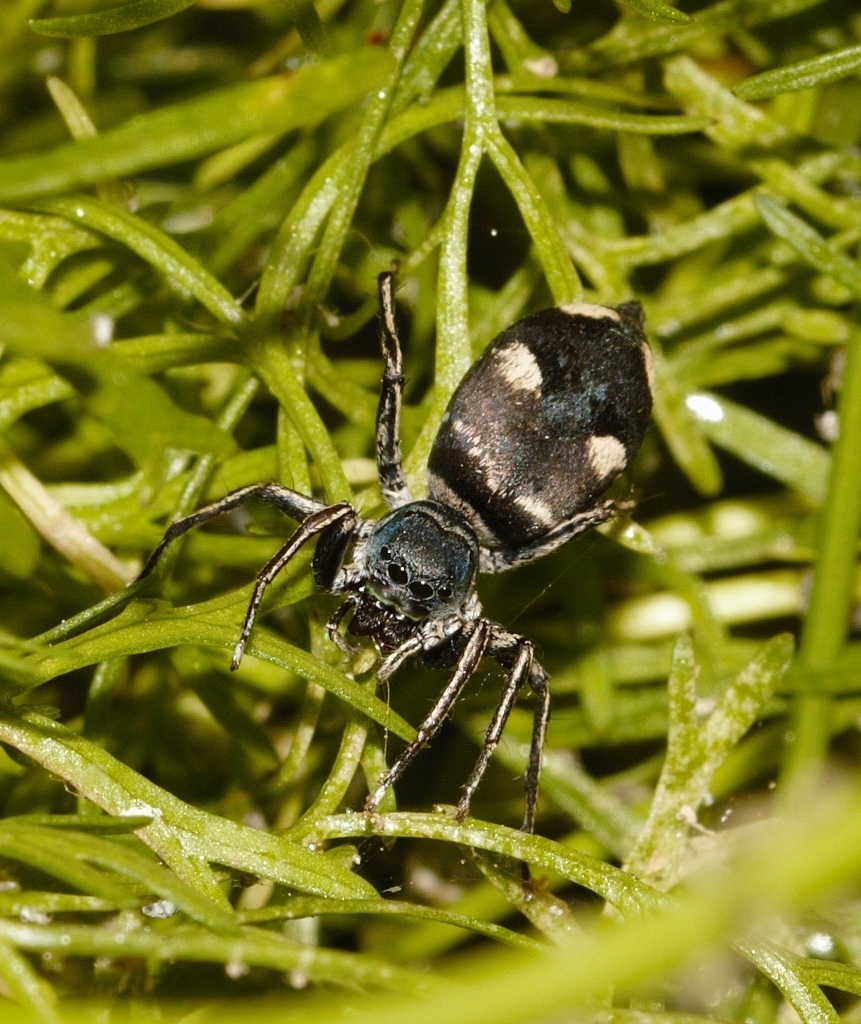
- A related species, Mexcala quadrimaculata

Scientific classification
- Kingdom: Animalia
- Phylum: Arthropoda
- Subphylum: Chelicerata
- Class: Arachnida
- Order: Araneae
- Infraorder: Araneomorphae
- Family: Salticidae
- Genus: Mexcala
- Species: M. kabondo

Binomial name
- Mexcala kabondo Wesołowska, 2009

= Mexcala kabondo =

Species of spider

Mexcala kabondo is a species of jumping spider in the genus Mexcala that lives in the Democratic Republic of the Congo, Malawi and Tanzania. The spider was first defined in 2009 by Wanda Wesołowska, one of over 500 that the arachnologist described during her career. It mimics ants and ant-like wasps, living alongside and preying upon them. The spider is medium-sized, with a brown to blackish carapace between 3.0 and 3.3 mm (0.12 and 0.13 in) long and an abdomen between 4.0 and 5.3 mm (0.16 and 0.21 in) long that is nearly black with a pattern of three black bands and four orange patches. It is typical of the genus. The internal structure of the female copulatory organs is the most distinguishing feature of the species. The male has not been described.

== Taxonomy ==
Mexcala kabondo is a jumping spider that was first described by the Polish arachnologist Wanda Wesołowska in 2009, one of over 500 species she identified during her career. She allocated the species to the genus Mexcala, first raised by George and Elizabeth Peckham in 1902 as part of a thorough revision of the genus. The genus was a member of the tribe Heliophaninae alongside Pseudicius and Cosmophasis, which was absorbed into Chrysillini by Wayne Maddison in 2015. The tribe is a member of the clade Saltafresia within the subfamily Salticoida. A year later, in 2016, Jerzy Prószyński allocated the genus to the Heliophanines group of genera, which was named after the genus Heliophanus. The genera share characteristics, including having a rather uniform, mainly dark appearance. The species itself has a name that is derived from Kabondo dianda, the name of the town 18 kilometres (11 mi) away from the place where the first example was collected.

== Description ==
Like all Mexcala spiders, the species is slender and medium-sized. The female has a brown to blackish carapace that range from 3.0 to 3.3 mm (0.12 to 0.13 in) long. It has small white scales on its thorax, black mouthparts and a black sternum. The abdomen is between 4.0 and 5.3 mm (0.16 and 0.21 in) long and blackish with a whitish line to the front, three black bands in the middle and four orange patches to the rear. It has thin brown legs. The epigyne is large with two shallow depressions. The copulatory openings lead to very sclerotized seminal ducts that sit next to each other and receptacles that sit on top of each other. This internal structure is the most distinguishing feature of the species and enables it to be differentiated from others in the genus. The male has not been described.

Like many jumping spiders, Wesołowska and Tamás Szűts noted that Mexcala spiders mimic ants. Some are particularly similar to members of the Camponotus genus. However, they mainly resemble Mutillidae, species of wasp that have ant-like characteristics. The species particularly resembles the female, which is wingless, in its body proportions.

== Behaviour ==
The spider is typical of the genus. It lives amongst the species of ant that it mimics, and preys upon. Like other jumping spiders, it is mainly a diurnal hunter that uses its good eyesight to spot its prey. It attacks from the front and captures its prey behind the head. The chelicerae have short thick spines on them which may be used for digging holes to act as underground hiding places. It uses visual displays during courtship and transmits vibratory signals through silk to communicate to other spiders.

== Distribution ==
Mexcala spiders can be found across Africa and the Arabian peninsula. Mexcala kabondo lives in the Democratic Republic of the Congo, Malawi and Tanzania. The species was first discovered near Kabondo in Congo, the holotype being collected in 1958. It was also identified in other parts of the country, including Mpala on the edge of Lake Tanganyika, Kasongo and Kisangani. The first example found in Tanzania was seen in 1959 near Kasoge Camp on Lake Tanganyika and then in Malawi in 1972 near Chitipa at an altitude of 1,432 m (4,698 ft) above sea level.
