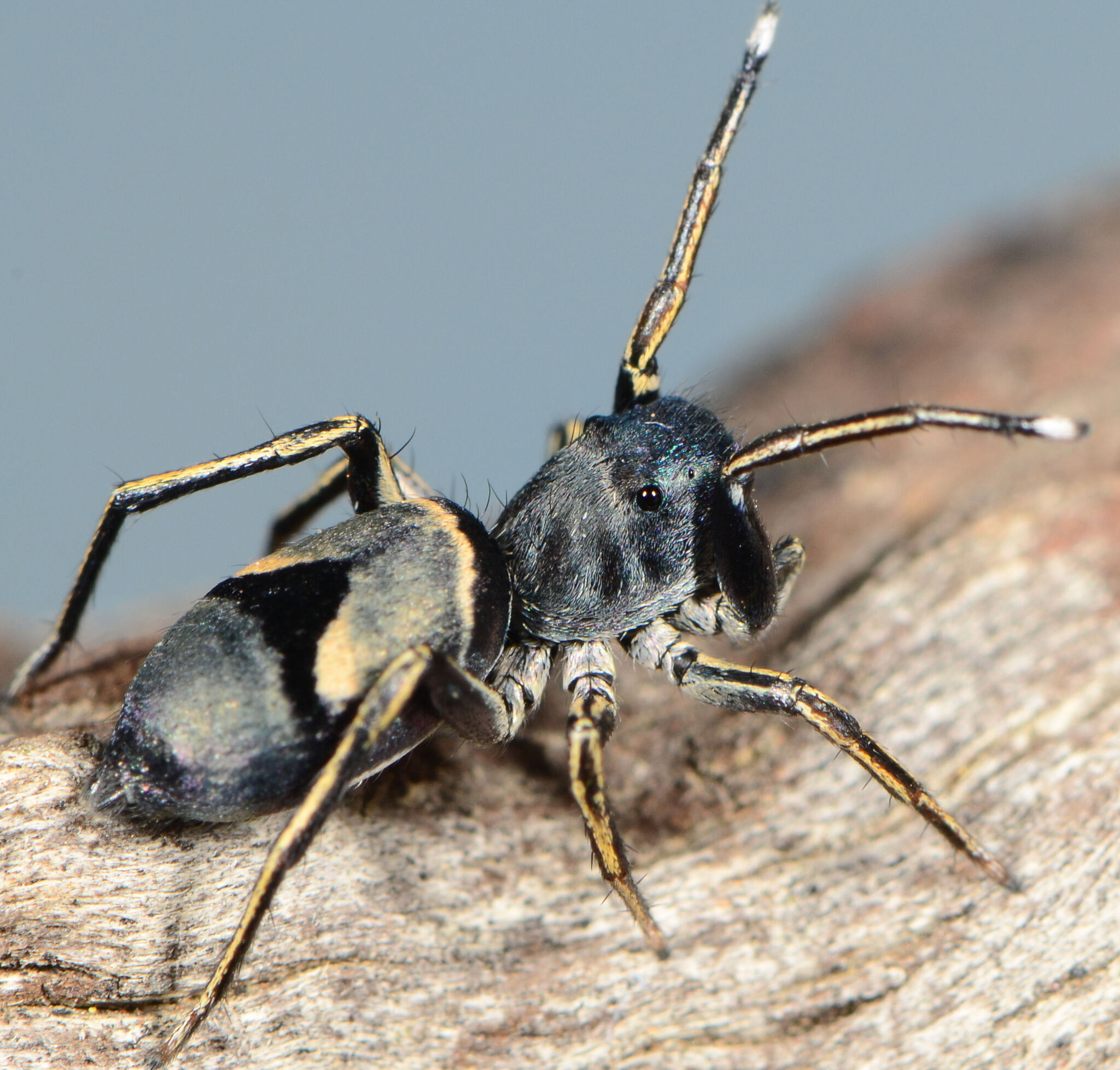
- Female Mexcala elegans
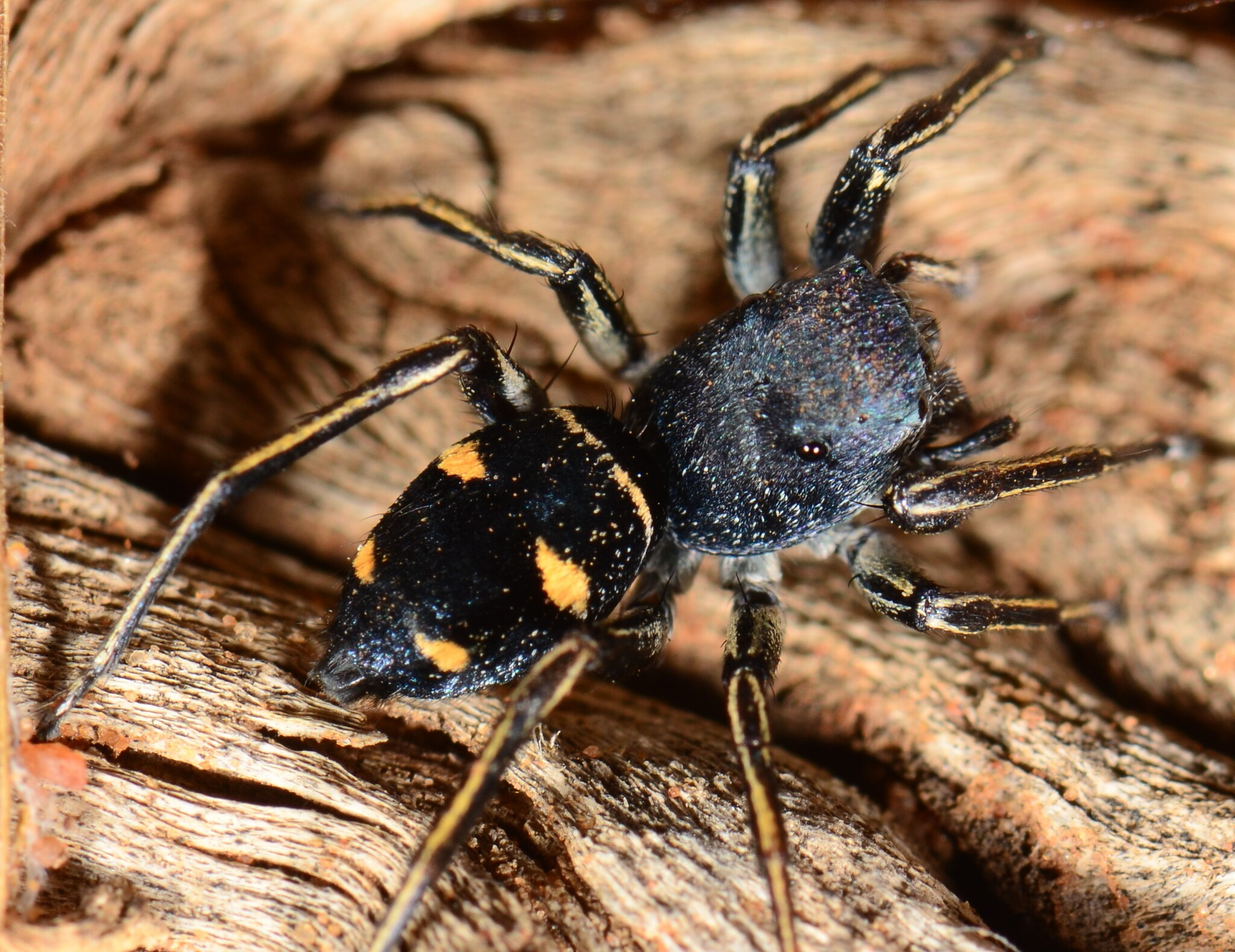
- Female Mexcala quadrimaculata

Scientific classification
- Kingdom: Animalia
- Phylum: Arthropoda
- Subphylum: Chelicerata
- Class: Arachnida
- Order: Araneae
- Infraorder: Araneomorphae
- Family: Salticidae
- Subfamily: Salticinae
- Genus: Mexcala; Peckham & Peckham, 1902

Type species
- M. rufa Peckham & Peckham, 1902

Species
- 22, see text

= Mexcala =

Genus of spiders

Mexcala is a genus of jumping spiders that was first described by George and Elizabeth Peckham in 1902. The name is probably derived from the Nahuatl mezcal.

== Distribution ==
Mexcala are found only in Africa, Yemen, and Iran.

== Species ==
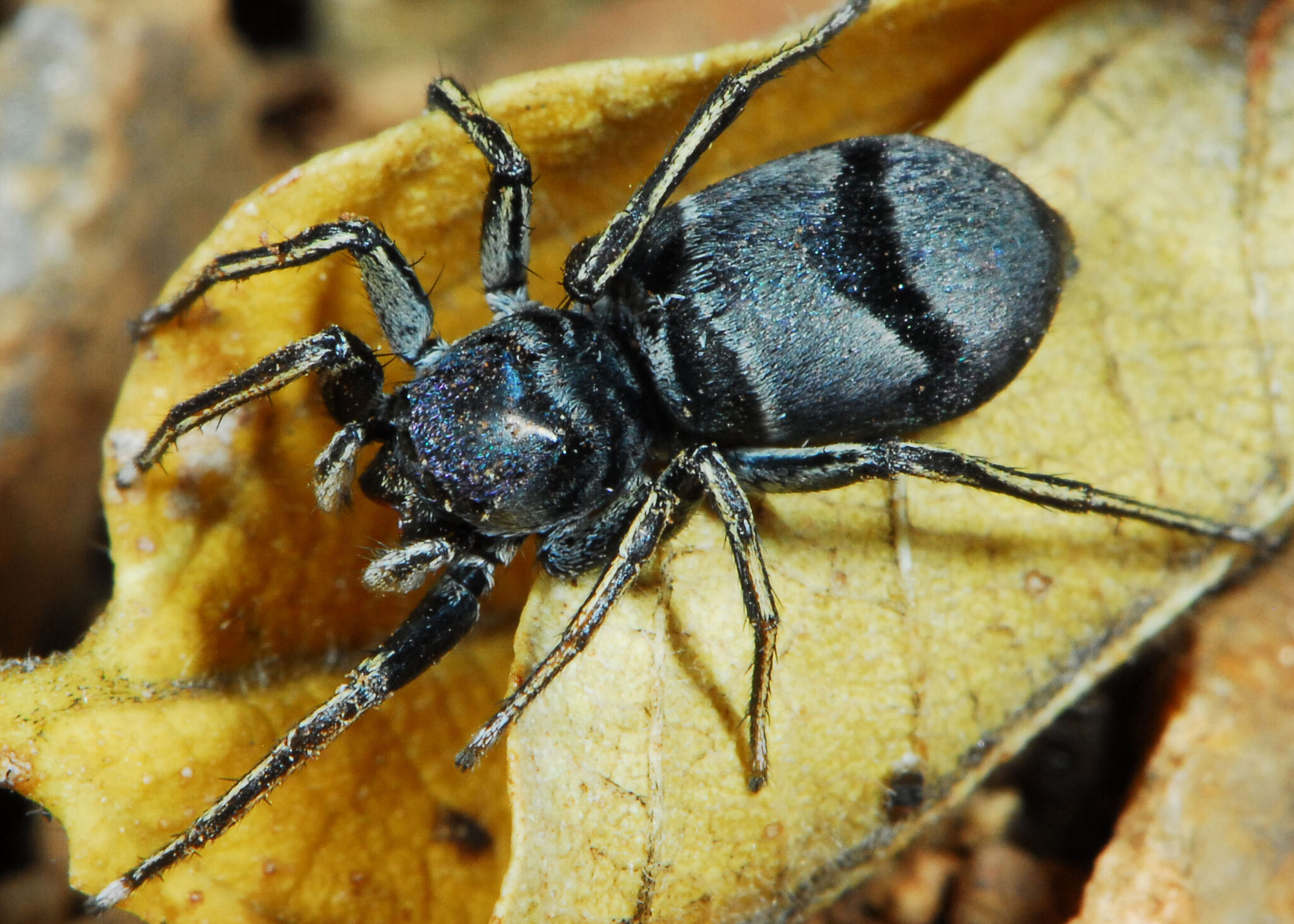
female M. elegans

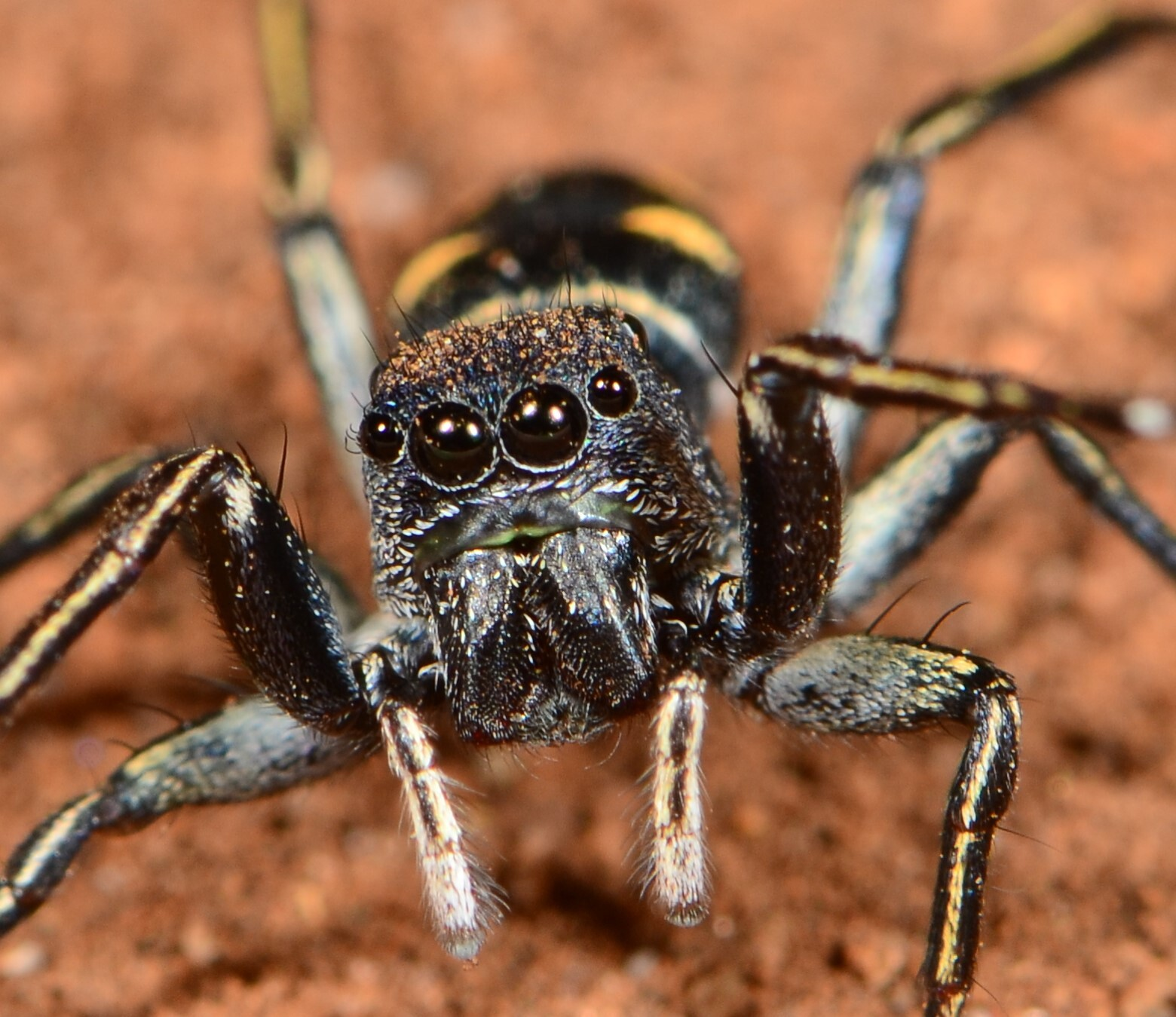
female M. quadrimaculata

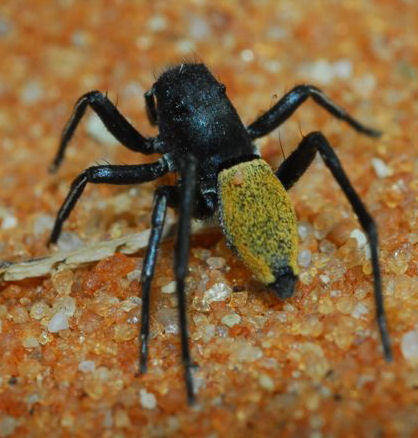
female M. rufa

As of October 2025, this genus includes 22 species:

- Mexcala agilis Lawrence, 1928 – DR Congo, Kenya, Malawi, Tanzania, Namibia
- Mexcala angolensis Wesołowska, 2009 – Angola
- Mexcala caerulea (Simon, 1901) – Guinea, Sierra Leone, Ivory Coast
- Mexcala elegans G. W. Peckham & E. G. Peckham, 1903 – Ivory Coast, Malawi, Namibia, Botswana, Zimbabwe, Mozambique, South Africa
- Mexcala farsensis Logunov, 2001 – Iran
- Mexcala fizi Wesołowska, 2009 – Congo, Tanzania
- Mexcala formosa Wesołowska & Tomasiewicz, 2008 – Ethiopia
- Mexcala inopinata Wiśniewski & Wesołowska, 2024 – Uganda
- Mexcala kabondo Wesołowska, 2009 – Congo, Malawi, Tanzania
- Mexcala macilenta Wesołowska & Russell-Smith, 2000 – Ethiopia, Tanzania
- Mexcala meridiana Wesołowska, 2009 – South Africa
- Mexcala monstrata Wesołowska & van Harten, 1994 – Egypt, Yemen
- Mexcala namibica Wesołowska, 2009 – Namibia
- Mexcala nigrocyanea (Simon, 1886) – Libya, Egypt, Ethiopia
- Mexcala ovambo Wesołowska, 2009 – Namibia
- Mexcala quadrimaculata (Lawrence, 1942) – Zimbabwe, South Africa
- Mexcala rufa G. W. Peckham & E. G. Peckham, 1902 – Namibia, Botswana, South Africa (type species)
- Mexcala signata Wesołowska, 2009 – Kenya, Tanzania
- Mexcala smaragdina Wesołowska & Edwards, 2012 – Nigeria
- Mexcala synagelese Wesołowska, 2009 – Sudan, Ivory Coast, Nigeria, DR Congo, Uganda, Angola
- Mexcala torquata Wesołowska, 2009 – Guinea, Ivory Coast
- Mexcala vicina Wesołowska, 2009 – Cameroon, Congo
