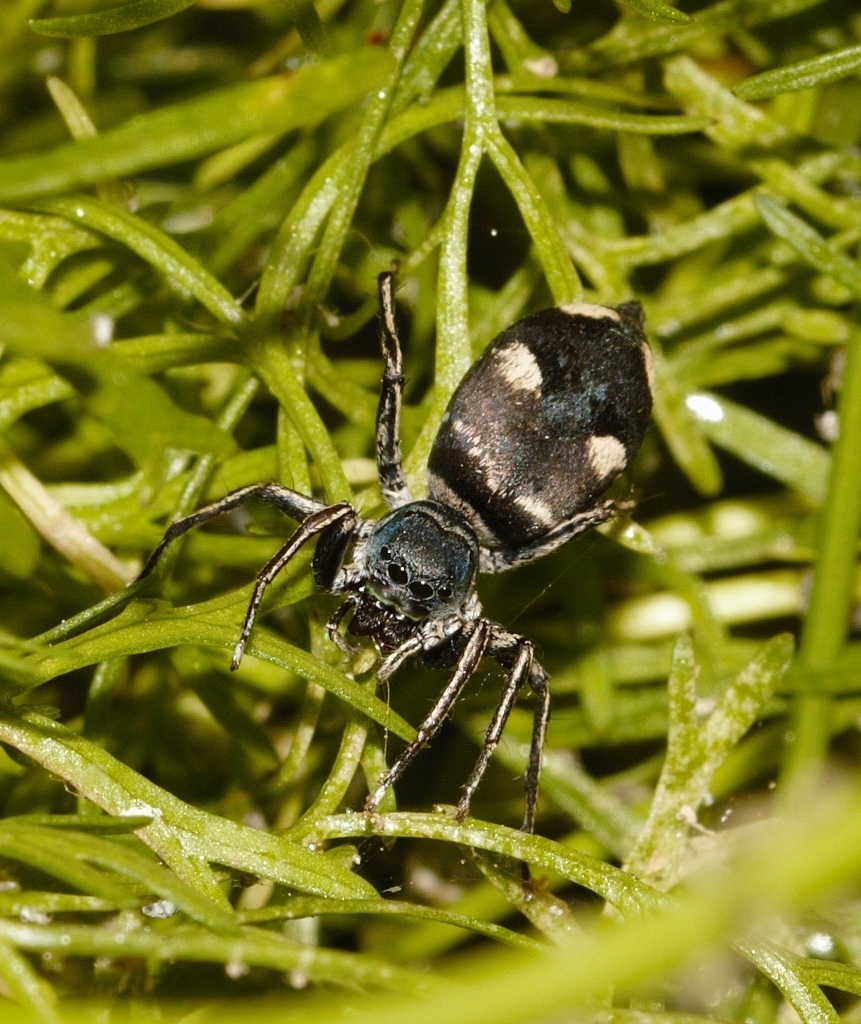
- A related species, Mexcala quadrimaculata

Scientific classification
- Kingdom: Animalia
- Phylum: Arthropoda
- Subphylum: Chelicerata
- Class: Arachnida
- Order: Araneae
- Infraorder: Araneomorphae
- Family: Salticidae
- Genus: Mexcala
- Species: M. vicina

Binomial name
- Mexcala vicina Wesołowska, 2009

= Mexcala vicina =

Species of spider

Mexcala vicina is a species of jumping spider in the genus Mexcala that is endemic to South Africa, found in Mpumalanga. The spider was first defined in 2009 by Wanda Wesołowska, one of over 500 that the arachnologist described during her career. It mimics ants and ant-like wasps, living alongside and preying upon them. The spider is medium-sized, with a dark brown carapace typically 2.5 mm (0.098 in) long and a brown abdomen between 2.3 and 2.7 mm (0.091 and 0.106 in) long. The abdomen has a pattern made up of three dark streaks in a triangular shape. The male has a straight embolus. The female has not been identified.

== Taxonomy ==
Mexcala vicina is a jumping spider that was first described by the Polish arachnologist Wanda Wesołowska in 2009, one of over 500 species she identified during her career. She allocated the species to the genus Mexcala, first raised by George and Elizabeth Peckham in 1902, as part of a thorough revision of the genus. The genus was a member of the tribe Heliophaninae alongside Pseudicius and Cosmophasis, which was absorbed into Chrysillini by Wayne Maddison in 2015. The tribe is a member of the clade Saltafresia within the subfamily Salticoida. A year later, in 2016, Jerzy Prószyński allocated the genus to the Heliophanines group of genera, which was named after the genus Heliophanus. The genera share characteristics, including having a rather uniform, mainly dark appearance. The species name is derived from the Latin word for neighbour and refers to its relationship with other spiders in the genus.

== Description ==
Like all Mexcala spiders, the species is slender and medium-sized. The male has a dark brown carapace covered in dense brown hairs that is typically 2.5 mm (0.098 in) long. The eye field is darker with black markings around the eyes. The chelicerae have two small teeth at the front and one at the rear. The spider has a low brown clypeus and light brown labium, sternum and spinnerets. The abdomen is between 2.3 and 2.7 mm (0.091 and 0.106 in) long, brown and hairy with a triangular pattern of three darker streaks on the back. The underside is plain brown. It has light brown legs. The pedipalps are yellow. The palpal bulb has a wide tibial apophysis that has a hooked end. The embolus is straight and fixed to the tegulum. The female has not been described.

== Behaviour ==
Like many jumping spiders, Wesołowska and Tamás Szűts noted that Mexcala spiders mimic ants. The species lives amongst the species of ant and ant-like wasps that it mimics. Like other jumping spiders, it is mainly a diurnal hunter that uses its good eyesight to spot its prey. It attacks from the front and captures its prey behind the head. The chelicerae have short thick spines on them which may be used for digging holes to act as underground hiding places. It uses visual displays during courtship and transmits vibratory signals through silk to communicate to other spiders.

== Distribution ==
Mexcala spiders can be found across Africa and the Arabian peninsula. Mexcala vicina lives in Cameroon and Republic of the Congo. The holotype was found near Batouri in Cameroon in 1976. The first example found in Congo was discovered in 1956.
