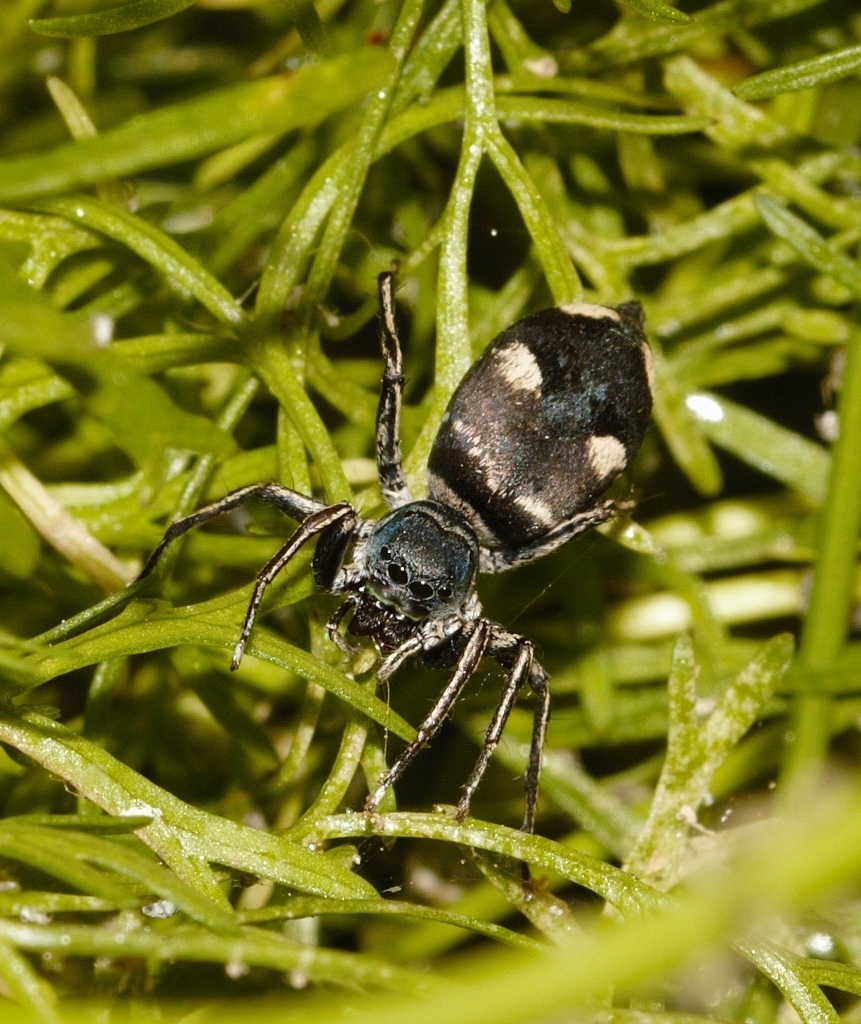
- A related species, Mexcala quadrimaculata

Scientific classification
- Kingdom: Animalia
- Phylum: Arthropoda
- Subphylum: Chelicerata
- Class: Arachnida
- Order: Araneae
- Infraorder: Araneomorphae
- Family: Salticidae
- Genus: Mexcala
- Species: M. torquata

Binomial name
- Mexcala torquata Wesołowska, 2009

= Mexcala torquata =

Species of spider

Mexcala torquata is a species of jumping spider in the genus Mexcala that lives in Guinea and Ivory Coast. It was first defined in 2009 by Wanda Wesołowska, one of over 500 that the arachnologist described during her career. The spider is medium-sized, with a dark brown carapace that is between 3.0 and 3.3 mm (0.12 and 0.13 in) long and a brown abdomen between 3.0 and 3.7 mm (0.12 and 0.15 in) long. It has long thin legs and serrated chelicerae. Similar to other species in the genus, it mimics ants and ant-like wasps, living alongside and preying upon them. The female has a distinctive fillet on the back of its abdomen, after which the species is named. However, it can be most easily distinguished from other spiders in the genus by its relatively small copulatory organs, specifically its very small epigyne, seminal ducts and embolus.

== Taxonomy ==
Mexcala torquata is a jumping spider that was first described by the Polish arachnologist Wanda Wesołowska in 2009, one of over 500 species she identified during her career. She allocated the species to the genus Mexcala, first raised by George and Elizabeth Peckham in 1902 as part of a thorough revision of the genus. The genus was a member of the tribe Heliophaninae alongside Pseudicius and Cosmophasis, which was absorbed into Chrysillini by Wayne Maddison in 2015. The tribe is a member of the clade Saltafresia within the subfamily Salticoida. A year later, in 2016, Jerzy Prószyński allocated the genus to the Heliophanines group of genera, which was named after the genus Heliophanus. The genera share characteristics, including having a rather uniform, mainly dark appearance. The species itself has a name that is based on the Latin word meaning with fillet and refers to the pattern on the female abdomen.

== Description ==
Like all Mexcala spiders, the species is slender and medium-sized. The male has a cephalothorax typically 3.0 mm (0.12 in) long and 1.9 mm (0.075 in) wide. The medium-high chocolate-brown carapace is narrower at the front. It has a short black eye field and long brown bristles near to the eyes, some of which are surrounded by black rings. The carapace has white hairs on the slopes to the front. The clypeus is low and brown. The long chelicerae have a serrated front and single small tooth to the back, short sharp bristles and very small white scales on the outside. The remainder of the mouthparts are brown, as is the sternum. The slightly-lighter brown abdomen is typically 3.0 mm (0.12 in) long and 1.7 mm (0.067 in) wide. It is elongated in shape, narrower to the rear, with sparse dark hairs on the back and long brown bristles on the front edge. The underside is also brown. The spider has dark spinnerets. The long thing legs are brown, with light areas. The rearmost pair are longest. The yellow pedipalps have a dark line on the tibia and patella joint. The tibial apophysis, or spike, is very thin and the embolus is very small and reminiscent of a tiny spine.

The female is generally larger than the male. It has a dark brown carapace that is between 3.1 and 3.3 mm (0.12 and 0.13 in) long and has dark hairs on its thorax. It too has a black eye field with long brown bristles near the eyes. The chelicerae have a similar single small tooth at the back and serrated front to the male and the maxilla is thin, black with a whitish edge. The remainder of the mouthparts are black. The abdomen is between 3.6 and 3.7 mm (0.14 and 0.15 in) long and dark brown with a black fillet half way down its length. It is covered in scale-like hairs and a scattering of brown bristles. The underside is dark. The long legs are dark brown, although the front two are lighter and have a pattern of black lines that cross them like belts. The epigyne is very small and is dominated by a large depression. The internal structure of the copulatory organs is very simple. The copulatory openings lead to a straight seminal ducts and spherical receptacles.

Like many jumping spiders, Wesołowska and Tamás Szűts noted that Mexcala spiders mimic ants. Some are particularly similar to members of the Camponotus genus. However, they mainly resemble Mutillidae, species of wasp that have ant-like characteristics. The species particularly resembles the female, which is wingless, in its body proportions. The spider can be distinguished from other species by the small size of the copulatory organs, both the very short embolus and short seminal ducts, which are complementary.

== Behaviour ==
The spider is typical of the genus. It lives amongst the different species of ant and ant-like insect that it mimics and preys upon. Like other jumping spiders, it is a mainly diurnal hunter that uses its good eyesight to spot its prey. It attacks from the front and captures its prey behind the head. The chelicerae have short thick spines on them that may be used for digging holes to act as underground hiding places. It uses visual displays during courtship and transmits vibratory signals through silk to communicate to other spiders.

== Distribution ==
Mexcala spiders can be found across Africa and the Arabian peninsula. Mexcala torquata has been identified in Guinea and Ivory Coast. The female holotype was found near Kossou, Ivory Coast, in 1974. The first example discovered in Guinea was found near Lola in 1957. The first male specimen was collected in Lamto Scientific Reserve in Ivory Coast in 1975.
