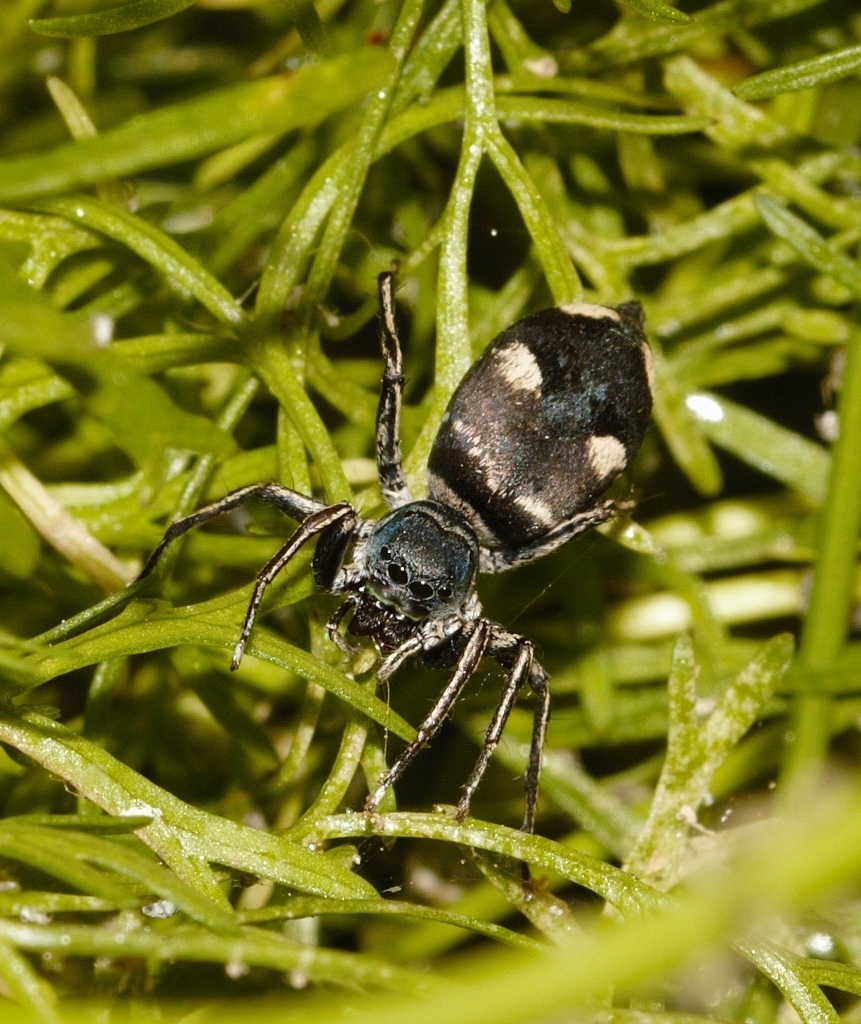
- A related species, Mexcala quadrimaculata

Scientific classification
- Kingdom: Animalia
- Phylum: Arthropoda
- Subphylum: Chelicerata
- Class: Arachnida
- Order: Araneae
- Infraorder: Araneomorphae
- Family: Salticidae
- Genus: Mexcala
- Species: M. signata

Binomial name
- Mexcala signata Wesołowska, 2009

= Mexcala signata =

Species of spider

Mexcala signata is a species of jumping spider in the genus Mexcala that lives in Kenya and Tanzania. The spider was first defined in 2009 by Wanda Wesołowska, one of over 500 that the arachnologist described during her career. It mimics ants and ant-like wasps, living alongside and preying upon them. Only the female has been identified. The spider is medium-sized, with a dark carapace typically 3.2 mm (0.13 in) long and a black abdomen typically 3.3 mm (0.13 in) long. The abdomen has a distinctive pattern with a white stripe to the front, dark shape in the middle and orange marks on the sides, after which it is named. It is distinguished from other spiders in its genus by its short seminal ducts.

== Taxonomy ==
Mexcala signata is a jumping spider that was first described by the Polish arachnologist Wanda Wesołowska in 2009, one of over 500 species she identified during her career. She allocated the species to the genus Mexcala, first raised by George and Elizabeth Peckham in 1902 as part of a thorough revision of the genus. The genus was a member of the tribe Heliophaninae alongside Pseudicius and Cosmophasis, which was absorbed into Chrysillini by Wayne Maddison in 2015. The tribe is a member of the clade Saltafresia within the subfamily Salticoida. A year later, in 2016, Jerzy Prószyński allocated the genus to the Heliophanines group of genera, which was named after the genus Heliophanus. The genera share characteristics, including having a rather uniform, mainly dark appearance. The species itself has a name that is derived from the Latin word for signed and relates to the pattern on the spider's abdomen.

== Description ==
Like all Mexcala spiders, the species is slender and medium-sized. The female has a dark carapace covered in delicate light hairs that is typically 3.2 mm (0.13 in) long. There are bristles near the eyes. The shiny black hairy abdomen is typically 3.8 mm (0.15 in) long, with a pattern with a thin white line in the middle, a dull dark fillet in the middle and two orange marks on the sides. The underside is black with two white lines. It has yellowish-grey spinnerets and dark yellow legs. The pedipalps are also yellow, with a dark line on the outside. The epigyne is plain with indistinct copulatory openings placed horizontally with sclerotized edges that lead to short seminal ducts and bean-shaped receptacles. The relatively short seminal ducts help distinguish the species from others in the genus. The male has not been described.

== Behaviour ==
Like many jumping spiders, Wesołowska and Tamás Szűts noted that Mexcala spiders mimic ants. The species lives amongst various different species of ant and ant-like wasps that it mimics, and preys upon. Like other jumping spiders, it is a mainly diurnal hunter that uses its good eyesight to spot its prey. It attacks from the front and captures its prey behind the head. The chelicerae have short thick spines on them which may be used for digging holes to act as underground hiding places. It uses visual displays during courtship and transmits vibratory signals through silk to communicate to other spiders.

== Distribution ==
Mexcala spiders can be found across Africa and the Arabian peninsula. Mexcala signata lives in both Kenya and Tanzania. The female holotype was found near Nairobi, Kenya, in 2006. The first example found in Tanzania was discovered in Lake Manyara National Park in 1957.
