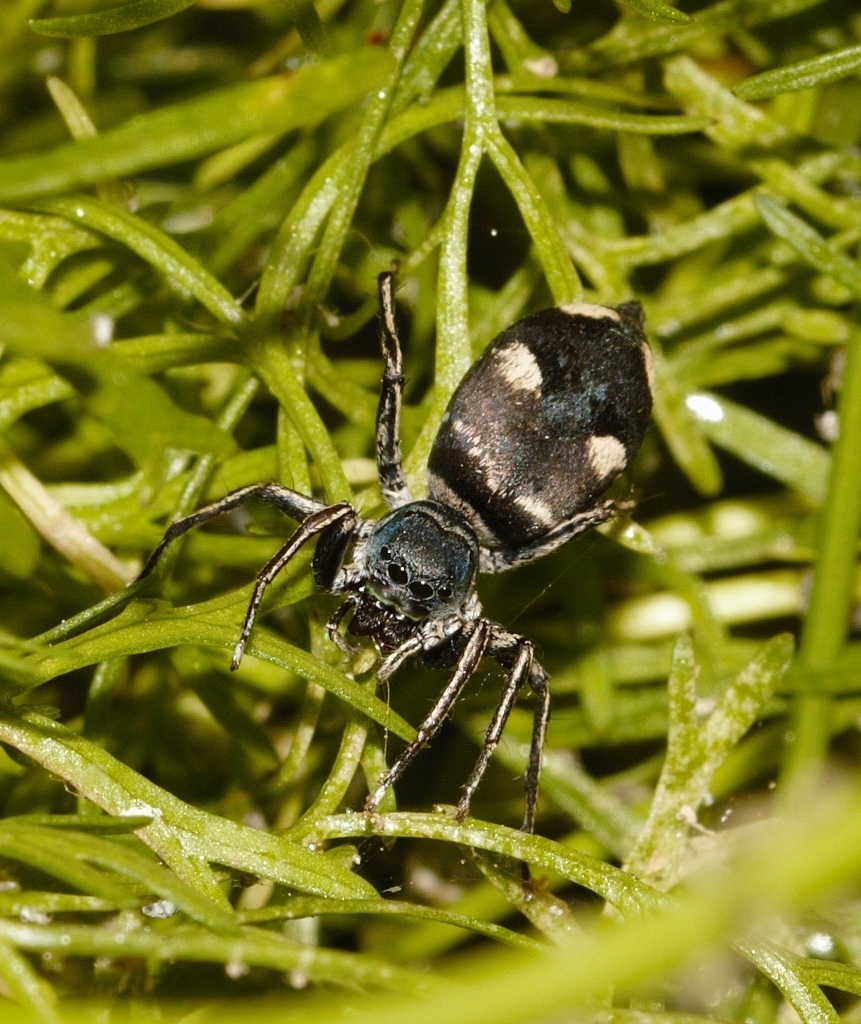
- A related species, Mexcala quadrimaculata

Scientific classification
- Kingdom: Animalia
- Phylum: Arthropoda
- Subphylum: Chelicerata
- Class: Arachnida
- Order: Araneae
- Infraorder: Araneomorphae
- Family: Salticidae
- Genus: Mexcala
- Species: M. ovambo

Binomial name
- Mexcala ovambo Wesołowska, 2009

= Mexcala ovambo =

Species of spider

Mexcala ovambo is a species of jumping spider in the genus Mexcala that is endemic to Namibia. The spider was first defined in 2009 by Wanda Wesołowska, one of over 500 that the arachnologist described during her career. The spider is medium-sized and slender, with a yellowish-brown body carapace typically 3.1 mm (0.12 in) long and an abdomen typically 4.7 mm (0.19 in) long. It mimics ants, living alongside and preying upon them. The female can be distinguished from the related Mexcala quadrimaculata in its widely spaced depressions in the epigyne. The male has not been described.

== Taxonomy ==
Mexcala ovambo is a jumping spider that was first described by the Polish arachnologist Wanda Wesołowska in 2009, one of over 500 species she identified during her career. She allocated the species to the genus Mexcala, first raised by George and Elizabeth Peckham in 1902 as part of a thorough revision of the genus. The genus was a member of the tribe Heliophaninae alongside Pseudicius and Cosmophasis, which was absorbed into Chrysillini by Wayne Maddison in 2015. The tribe is a member of the clade Saltafresia within the subfamily Salticoida. A year later, in 2016, Jerzy Prószyński allocated the genus to the Heliophanines group of genera, which was named after the genus Heliophanus. The genera share characteristics, including having a rather uniform, mainly dark appearance. The species itself has a name that is derived from the Ovambo people.

== Description ==
Like all Mexcala spiders, the species is slender and medium-sized. The female has s yellowish-brown carapace that is typically 3.1 mm (0.12 in) long. It has a dark eye field. The chelicerae have a single tooth. The abdomen is typically 4.7 mm (0.19 in) long and yellowish-brown. Brown hairs cover the whole body. The long thin legs are yellow with black lines along the sides. The epigyne has two rounded widely spaced openings leading to curved seminal ducts. The male has not been described.

The species is similar to Mexcala quadrimaculata, but differs in the more widely spaced depressions in the epigyne. Like many jumping spiders, Wesołowska and Tamás Szűts noted that Mexcala spiders mimic ants. Some are particularly similar to members of the Camponotus genus. However, they mainly resemble Mutillidae, a species of wasp that has ant-like characteristics. The species particularly resembles the female, which is wingless, in its body proportions.

== Behaviour ==
The spider is typical of the genus. It lives amongst the various different species of insect that it mimics, and preys upon. Like other jumping spiders, it is a mainly diurnal hunter that uses its good eyesight to spot its prey. It attacks from the front and captures its prey behind the head. The chelicerae have short thick spines on them that may be used for digging holes to act as underground hiding places. It uses visual displays during courtship and transmits vibratory signals through silk to communicate to other spiders.

== Distribution ==
Mexcala spiders can be found across Africa and the Arabian peninsula. Mexcala ovambo is endemic to Namibia in Southern Africa. The holotype was found near Ongandjera in 1923.
