= Goleta =

Goleta or La Goleta may refer to:

- Goleta (spider), a spider genus
- Goleta, California, United States, a suburban city in Santa Barbara County
- La Goleta, the Spanish and Portuguese name for La Goulette, a municipality and the port of Tunis, Tunisia
