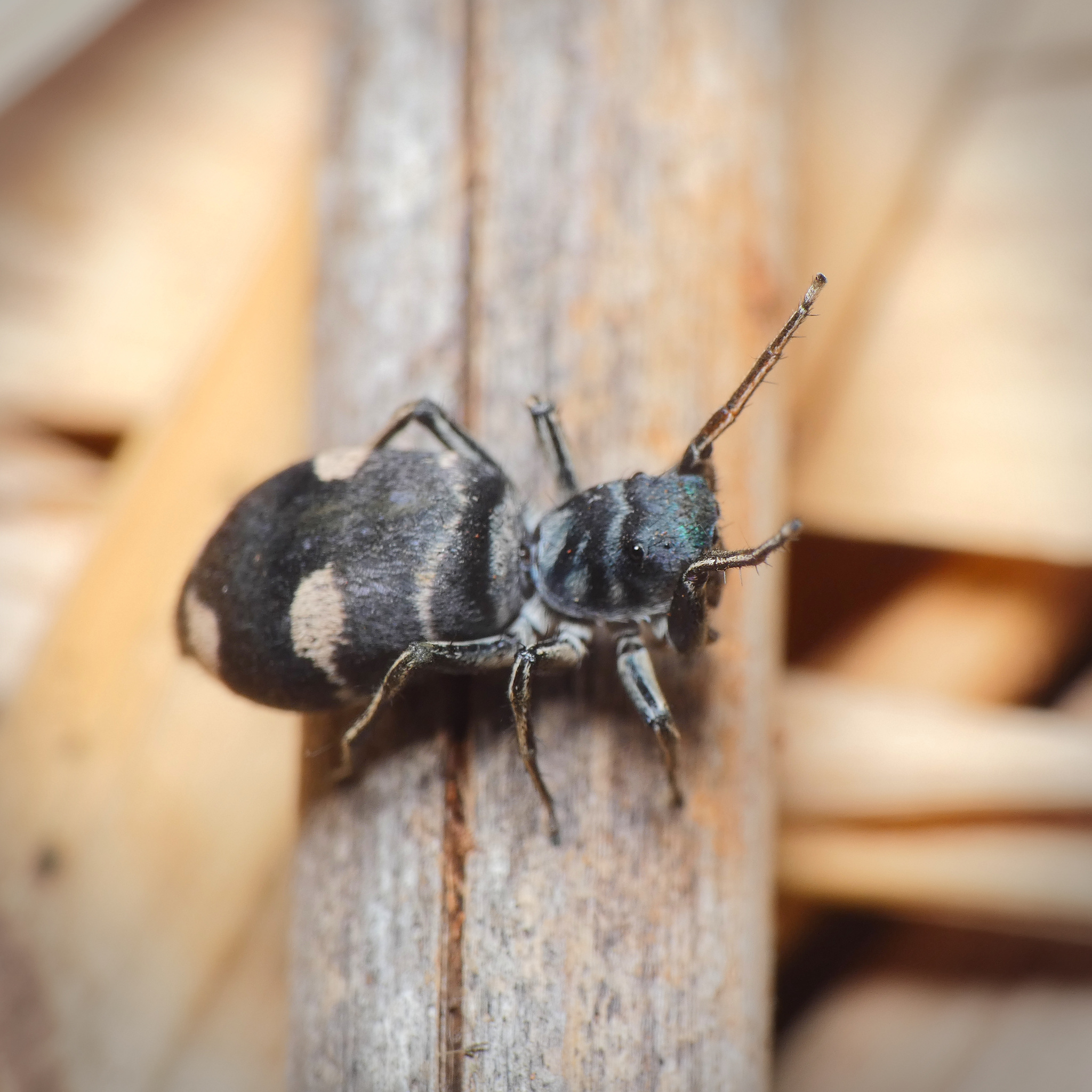
- A spider of the Mexcala genus

Scientific classification
- Kingdom: Animalia
- Phylum: Arthropoda
- Subphylum: Chelicerata
- Class: Arachnida
- Order: Araneae
- Infraorder: Araneomorphae
- Family: Salticidae
- Genus: Mexcala
- Species: M. meridiana

Binomial name
- Mexcala meridiana Wesołowska, 2009

= Mexcala meridiana =

Species of spider

Mexcala meridiana is a species of jumping spider in the genus Mexcala that is endemic to South Africa, found in Mpumalanga. The spider was first defined in 2009 by Wanda Wesołowska, one of over 500 that the arachnologist described during her career. It mimics ants and ant-like wasps, living alongside and preying upon them. Only the female has been identified. The spider is medium-sized, with a brown to blackish carapace typically 3.0 mm (0.12 in) long and a brownish abdomen typically 4.0 mm (0.16 in) long. It is similar externally to other spiders in the genus, the most distinguishing feature being its copulatory organs.

== Taxonomy ==
Mexcala meridiana is a jumping spider that was first described by the Polish arachnologist Wanda Wesołowska in 2009, one of over 500 species she identified during her career. She allocated the species to the genus Mexcala, first raised by George and Elizabeth Peckham in 1902 as part of a thorough revision of the genus. The genus was a member of the tribe Heliophaninae alongside Pseudicius and Cosmophasis, which was absorbed into Chrysillini by Wayne Maddison in 2015. The tribe is a member of the clade Saltafresia within the subfamily Salticoida. A year later, in 2016, Jerzy Prószyński allocated the genus to the Heliophanines group of genera, which was named after the genus Heliophanus. The genera share characteristics, including having a rather uniform, mainly dark appearance. The species itself has a name that is derived from the Latin word for southern and refers to it being found in Southern Africa.

== Description ==
Like all Mexcala spiders, the species is slender and medium-sized. The female has a brown carapace covered in dense brown hairs that is typically 3.0 mm (0.12 in) long. The eye field is darker with black markings around the eyes. It has light brown mouthparts with yellow edges to the maxilla. The abdomen is typically 4.0 mm (0.16 in) long, brownish on top and darker underneath, with a pattern of two lighter streaks It has light brown legs. The epigyne has a large shallow depression. The copulatory canals are separate to each other and lead to very simple internal copulatory organs. This differentiates the species from others in the genus. The male has not been described.

== Behaviour ==
Like many jumping spiders, Wesołowska and Tamás Szűts noted that Mexcala spiders mimic ants. The species lives amongst various different species of ant and ant-like wasps that it mimics, and preys upon. Like other jumping spiders, it is a mainly diurnal hunter that uses its good eyesight to spot its prey. It attacks from the front and captures its prey behind the head. The chelicerae have short thick spines on them which may be used for digging holes to act as underground hiding places. It uses visual displays during courtship and transmits vibratory signals through silk to communicate to other spiders.

== Distribution ==
Mexcala spiders can be found across Africa and the Arabian peninsula. Mexcala meridiana is endemic to South Africa. The holotype was found near Sabie in Mpumalanga in 1927.
