= Mexcala synagelese =

Scientific classification
- Kingdom: Animalia
- Phylum: Arthropoda
- Subphylum: Chelicerata
- Class: Arachnida
- Order: Araneae
- Infraorder: Araneomorphae
- Family: Salticidae
- Genus: Mexcala
- Species: M. synagelese

Binomial name
- Mexcala synagelese Wesołowska, 2009

Species of spider

Mexcala synagelese is a species of jumping spider in the genus Mexcala that lives in Angola, Democratic Republic of the Congo, Ivory Coast, Nigeria and Sudan. The spider was first defined in 2009 by Wanda Wesołowska, one of over 500 that the arachnologist described during her career. It mimics ants and ant-like wasps, living alongside and preying upon them. The spider is medium-sized, with a dark brown carapace between 2.7 and 3.2 mm (0.11 and 0.13 in) long and a pale brown to dark brown abdomen between 3.2 and 4.0 mm (0.13 and 0.16 in) long. The male has three strips on its abdomen while the female has a more complex pattern of dark bands and light patches. The spider has long thin brown legs. It has good eyesight, which it uses when hunting and also during courtship. The male palpal bulb has a long tibial apophysis, or spike, that curves in towards the bulb. The female epigyne has two shallow depressions and short seminal ducts that lead to long receptacles.

== Taxonomy ==
Mexcala synagelese is a jumping spider that was first described by the Polish arachnologist Wanda Wesołowska in 2009, one of over 500 species she identified during her career. She allocated the species to the genus Mexcala, first raised by George and Elizabeth Peckham in 1902, as part of a thorough revision of the genus. The genus was a member of the tribe Heliophaninae alongside Pseudicius and Cosmophasis, which was absorbed into Chrysillini by Wayne Maddison in 2015. The tribe is a member of the clade Saltafresia within the subfamily Salticoida. A year later, in 2016, Jerzy Prószyński allocated the genus to the Heliophanines group of genera, which was named after the genus Heliophanus. The genera share characteristics, including having a rather uniform, mainly dark appearance. The species itself has a name that is derived from another ant-like spider, Synageles.

== Description ==
Like all Mexcala spiders, the species is slender and medium-sized. The male has a dark brown carapace that ranges from 2.8 to 3.1 mm (0.11 to 0.12 in) in length. It has a black eye field that has brown bristles and black mouthparts. The abdomen is between 3.2 and 3.3 mm (0.13 and 0.13 in) long, slightly elongated, and pale brown to dark brown with three black bands crossing the middle. The underside is darker. It has yellowish spinnerets and long thin brown legs that are covered with brown hairs and long spines. The palpal bulb is elongated with the long thin tibial apophysis, or spike, that curves in towards the bulb. The embolus is fixed to the tegulum.

The female is slightly larger than the male, with a carapace that is between 2.7 and 3.2 mm (0.11 and 0.13 in) long and an abdomen between 3.4 and 4.0 mm (0.13 and 0.16 in) long. The abdomen has a pattern of dark bands and four light patches that is typical of the genus. The underside has a single dark wide streak. The legs are lighter, a yellowish-brown. The remainder of the spider is similar. The epigyne has two shallow depressions. The copulatory openings lead relatively short seminal ducts and long receptacles. The spider is similar to others in the genus. Particularly, the eipigyne is very similar to Mexcala nigrocyanea, although the receptacles are longer.

== Behaviour ==
The spider is typical of the genus. Like many jumping spiders, Wesołowska and Tamás Szűts noted that Mexcala spiders mimic ants. Some are particularly similar to members of the Camponotus genus. However, they mainly resemble Mutillidae, species of wasp that have ant-like characteristics. The species particularly resembles the female, which is wingless, in its body proportions. It lives amongst the various different species of ant and anti-like insect that it mimics, and preys upon.

Like other jumping spiders, it is mainly a diurnal hunter that uses its good eyesight to spot its prey. It attacks from the front and captures its prey behind the head. The chelicerae have short thick spines on them which may be used for digging holes to act as underground hiding places. It uses visual displays during courtship and transmits vibratory signals through silk to communicate to other spiders.

== Distribution ==
Mexcala spiders can be found across Africa and the Arabian peninsula. Mexcala synagelese lives in Angola, Democratic Republic of the Congo, Ivory Coast, Nigeria and Sudan. The holotype comes from Angola. The first example from the Congo was a female found near Likasi in 1956. In 1962, a male was identified near Khartoum in Sudan, other examples of both the female and the male of the species being found in the local area over the ensuing years. The first examples in Ivory Coast were discovered near Touba in 1966 and Kossou in 1972. The first examples from Nigeria were also first collected in 1972, near Ibadan. It was subsequently found in other parts of the now-dissolved Western State, including in what is now Ondo State.
