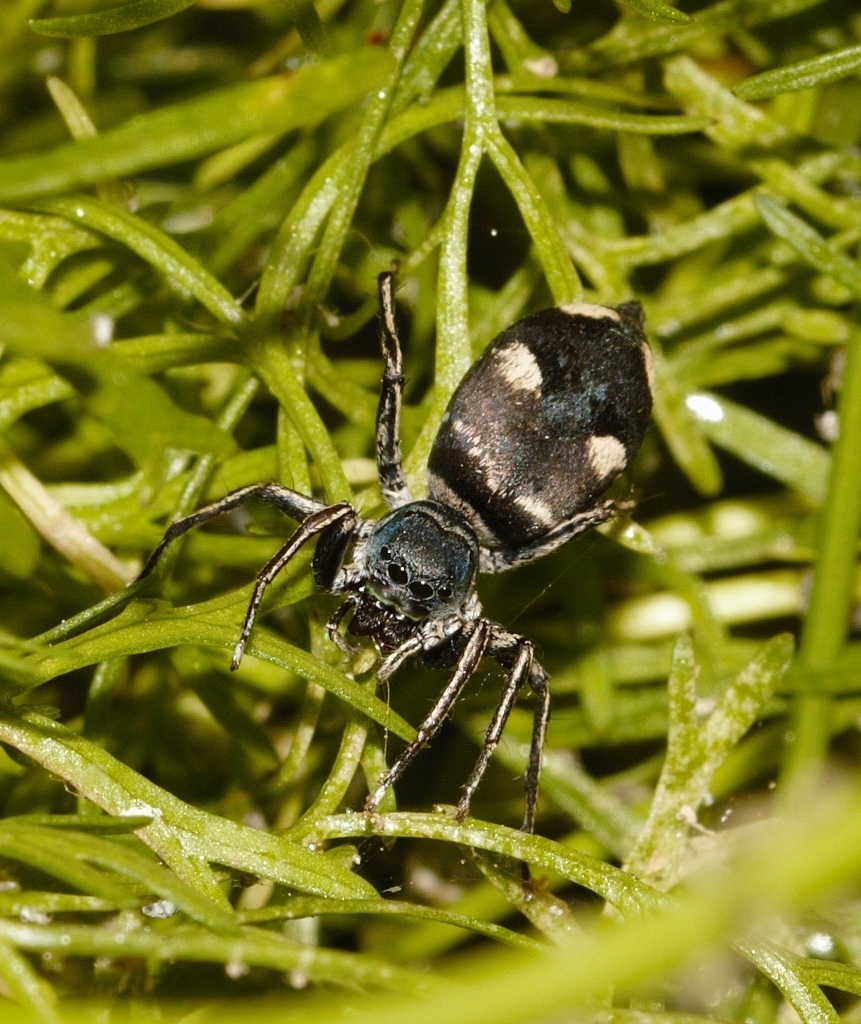
- A related species, Mexcala quadrimaculata

Scientific classification
- Kingdom: Animalia
- Phylum: Arthropoda
- Subphylum: Chelicerata
- Class: Arachnida
- Order: Araneae
- Infraorder: Araneomorphae
- Family: Salticidae
- Genus: Mexcala
- Species: M. fizi

Binomial name
- Mexcala fizi Wesołowska, 2009

= Mexcala fizi =

Species of spider

Mexcala fizi is a species of jumping spider in the genus Mexcala that lives in Democratic Republic of the Congo and Tanzania. The spider was first defined in 2009 by Wanda Wesołowska, one of over 500 that the arachnologist described during her career. It mimics ants and ant-like wasps, living alongside and preying upon them. The spider is medium-sized, with a dark browncarapace between 2.7 and 2.9 mm (0.11 and 0.11 in) long and a brown abdomen between 3.1 and 3.4 mm (0.12 and 0.13 in) long. The female has not been described.

== Taxonomy ==
Mexcala fizi is a jumping spider that was first described by the Polish arachnologist Wanda Wesołowska in 2009, one of over 500 species she identified during her career. She allocated the species to the genus Mexcala, first raised by George and Elizabeth Peckham in 1902 as part of a thorough revision of the genus. The genus was a member of the tribe Heliophaninae alongside Pseudicius and Cosmophasis, which was absorbed into Chrysillini by Wayne Maddison in 2015. The tribe is a member of the clade Saltafresia within the subfamily Salticoida. A year later, in 2016, Jerzy Prószyński allocated the genus to the Heliophanines group of genera, which was named after the genus Heliophanus. The genera share characteristics, including having a rather uniform, mainly dark appearance. The species itself has a name that is derived from Fizi, the name of the town 9 kilometres (5.6 mi) away from the place where the first example was collected.

== Description ==
Like all Mexcala spiders, the species is slender and medium-sized. The female has a dark brown hairy carapace that ranges from 2.7 to 2.9 mm (0.11 to 0.11 in) long. The chelicerae has a serrated front edge and a single tooth. The labium, maxilla and sternum are light brown. The abdomen is between 3.1 and 3.4 mm (0.12 and 0.13 in) long and brown with a pattern of three black bands in the middle. The spider has long thin legs and brown pedipalps. The palpal bulb is convex and the tibial apophysis is short. The embolus is fixed to the tegulum. The female has not been described.

== Behaviour ==
Like many jumping spiders, Wesołowska and Tamás Szűts noted that Mexcala spiders mimic ants. It lives amongst various different species of ant and ant-like wasp that it mimics, and preys upon. Like other jumping spiders, it is mainly a diurnal hunter that uses its good eyesight to spot its prey. It attacks from the front and captures its prey behind the head. The chelicerae have short thick spines on them which may be used for digging holes to act as underground hiding places. It uses visual displays during courtship and transmits vibratory signals through silk to communicate to other spiders.

== Distribution ==
Mexcala spiders can be found across Africa and the Arabian peninsula. Mexcala fizi was first discovered in Sud-Kivu District in Democratic Republic of the Congo at an altitude of 1,320 m (4,330 ft) above sea level, the holotype being collected in 1958. The first example found in Tanzania was seen in 1957 near Seronera in Serengeti National Park at an altitude of 1,500 m (4,900 ft) above sea level.
