= Goleta (spider) =

Scientific classification
- Kingdom: Animalia
- Phylum: Arthropoda
- Subphylum: Chelicerata
- Class: Arachnida
- Order: Araneae
- Infraorder: Araneomorphae
- Family: Salticidae
- Subfamily: Salticinae
- Genus: Goleta; Peckham & Peckham, 1894

Type species
- G. workmani (Peckham & Peckham, 1885)

Species
- G. peckhami Simon, 1900 – Madagascar; G. workmani (Peckham & Peckham, 1885) – Madagascar

Genus of spiders

Goleta is a genus of Malagasy jumping spiders that was first described by George and Elizabeth Peckham in 1894. As of June 2019 it contains only two species, found only on Madagascar: G. peckhami and G. workmani.
