= Mexcala inopinata =

Scientific classification
- Kingdom: Animalia
- Phylum: Arthropoda
- Subphylum: Chelicerata
- Class: Arachnida
- Order: Araneae
- Infraorder: Araneomorphae
- Family: Salticidae
- Genus: Mexcala
- Species: M. inopinata

Binomial name
- Mexcala inopinata Wiśniewski & Wesołowska, 2024

Species of jumping spider

Mexcala inopinata is a species of jumping spider in the genus Mexcala that lives in Uganda. It was first described in 2024.
