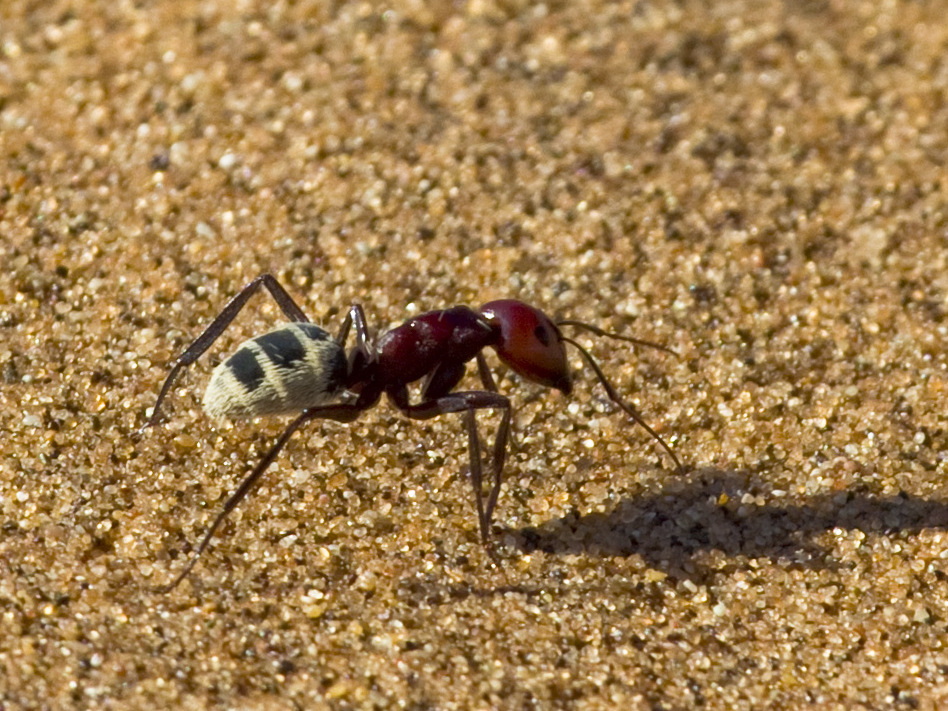
- Camponotus detritus, Namib-Naukluft National Park

Scientific classification
- Kingdom: Animalia
- Phylum: Arthropoda
- Clade: Pancrustacea
- Class: Insecta
- Order: Hymenoptera
- Family: Formicidae
- Subfamily: Formicinae
- Genus: Camponotus
- Subgenus: Myrmopiromis
- Species: C. detritus

Binomial name
- Camponotus detritus Emery, 1886

= Namib Desert dune ant =

Species of carpenter ant

The Namib Desert dune ant (Camponotus detritus), is a large ant species distinguished by white and black symmetrical stripes and markings on its hairy abdomen. It has an average mass of 45 milligrams (0.0016 oz). It is classified within the carpenter ant genus, a large group of more than 1,000 known species, many of which are associated with forested habitats in America and elsewhere. However C. detritus inhabits the hot dry dunes of the hyper-arid central Namib Desert in Southern Africa.

Both the distribution, abundance, and survival of the Namib desert dune ant is highly dependent and influenced solely on the factors of temperature, humidity, as well as vegetation conditions of the environment, these prime factors are vital for the survival of these colonies.

== Diet ==
Like many other ant species, it obtains its food and moisture by climbing the stalks of plants and drinking honeydew from scale insects, which themselves feed on shrubs and other perennial plants. It will also feed on dead insects.

== Habitat ==
Namib desert dune ants modify and build their habitats by building a stable infrastructure, this is done by collecting and using organic plant material, like leaves and other such materials. This process of collecting and carrying these plant materials and using them overall aids and supports the recycling process of the desert ecosystem.

== Nesting ==
The nests of this species, located amongst perennial plant roots, are systems of tunnels and chambers between 100–400 millimetres (3.9–15.7 in) deep. Nests can reach temperatures of 35 °C (95 °F) in summer, though they are much cooler in winter, typically 20–23 °C (68–73 °F). Nests are often lined with detritus - hence the binomial Latin name of the species. Each colony contains a single queen.

== Behavior and Adaptations ==
C. detritus is a diurnal species which uses its long legs to move at 5 mm above the surface, thus avoiding the highest temperatures which at noon in midsummer can reach 60 °C (140 °F). The temperature at 5 mm may be as much as 15 °C (27 °F) below that of the surface.

== Predators ==
The buckspoor spider Seothyra has been observed preying on these ants by hiding in the sand and grasping one limb of a passing ant, pinning it to the baking surface until it cooks to death, and then dragging it beneath the surface.
