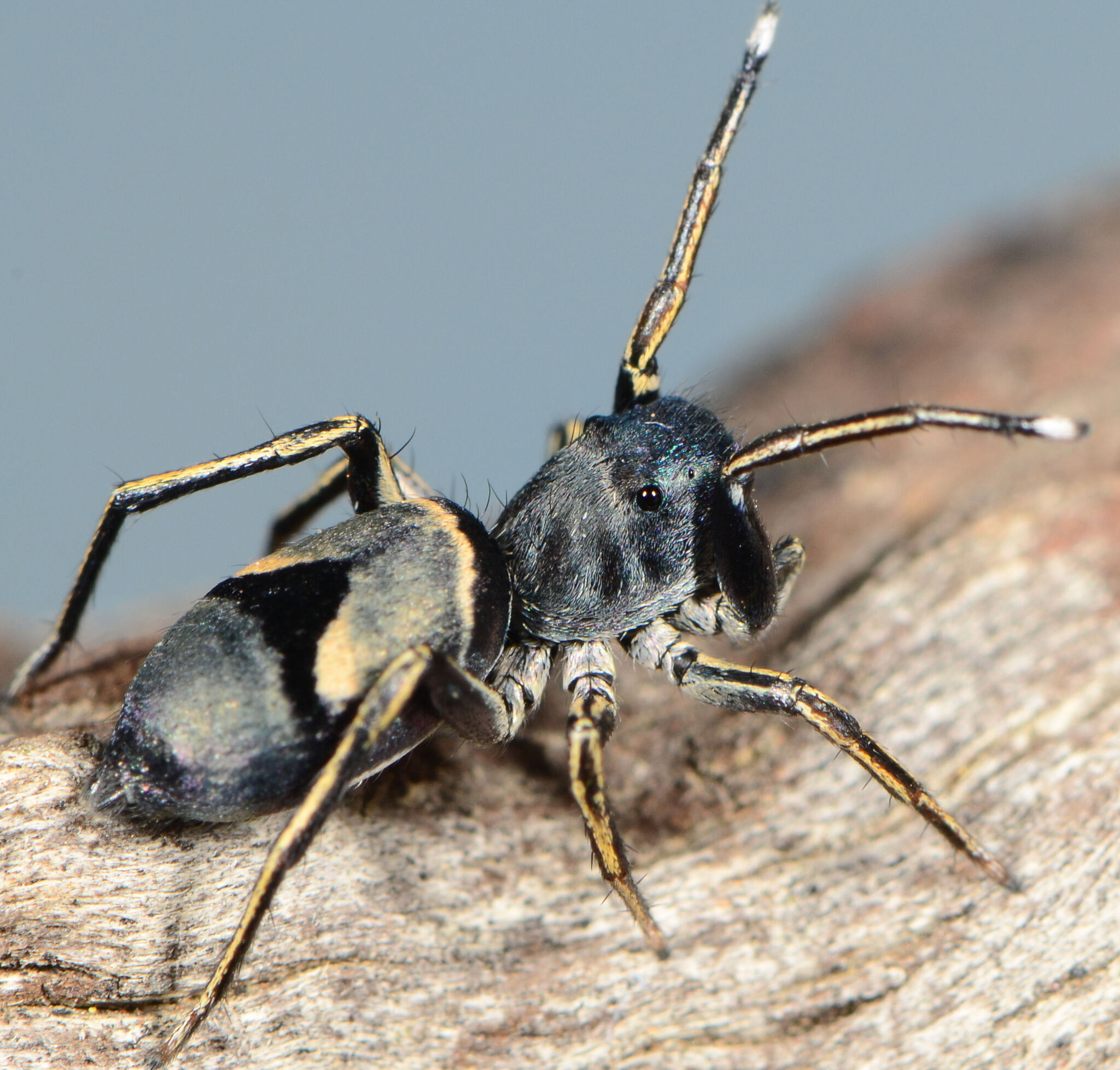
- female
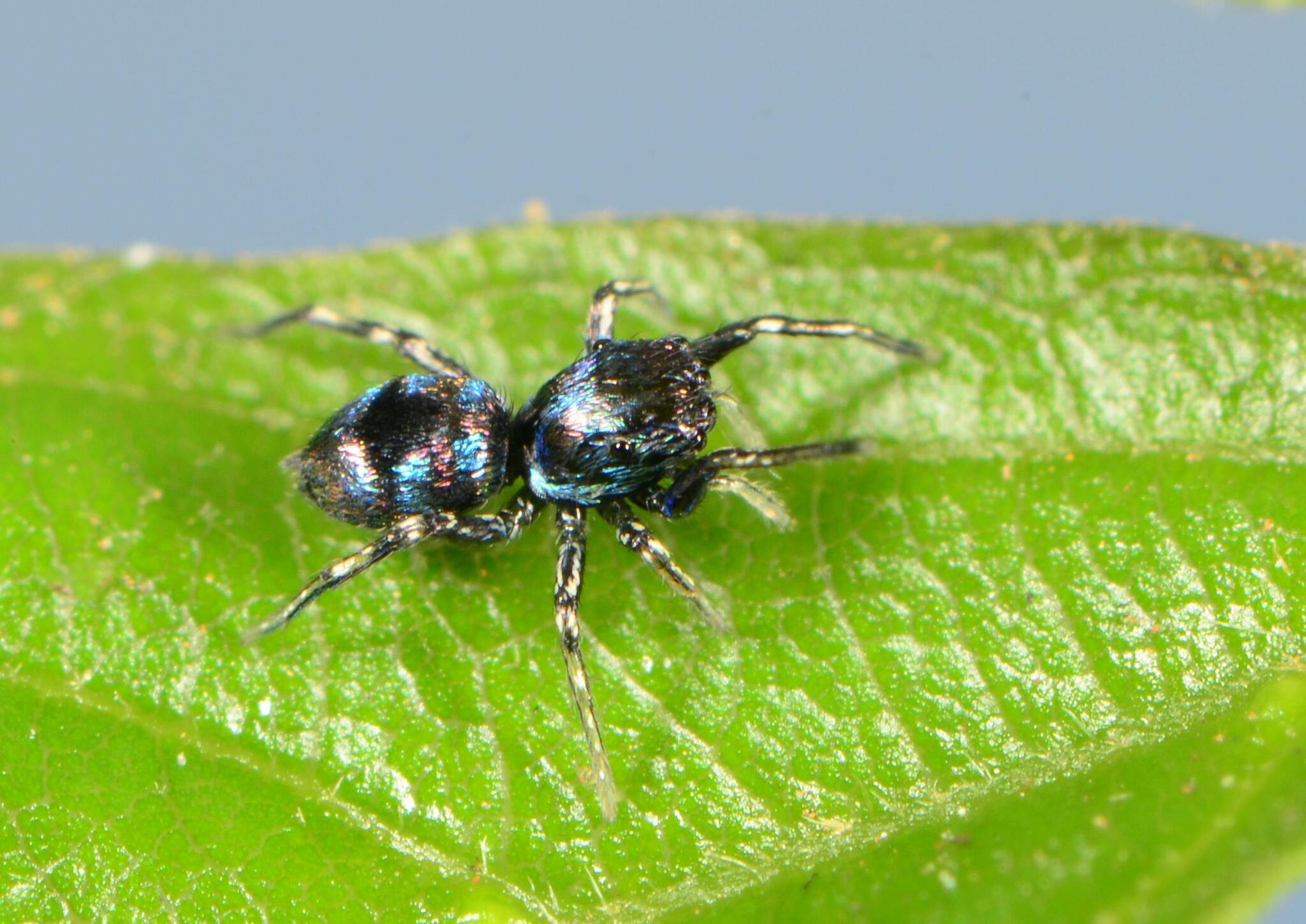
- juvenile

Scientific classification
- Kingdom: Animalia
- Phylum: Arthropoda
- Subphylum: Chelicerata
- Class: Arachnida
- Order: Araneae
- Infraorder: Araneomorphae
- Family: Salticidae
- Genus: Mexcala
- Species: M. elegans

Binomial name
- Mexcala elegans Peckham & Peckham, 1903

= Mexcala elegans =

Species of spider

Mexcala elegans is a species of spiders in the jumping spider family, Salticidae. It is found in Southern Africa. It preys on ants.

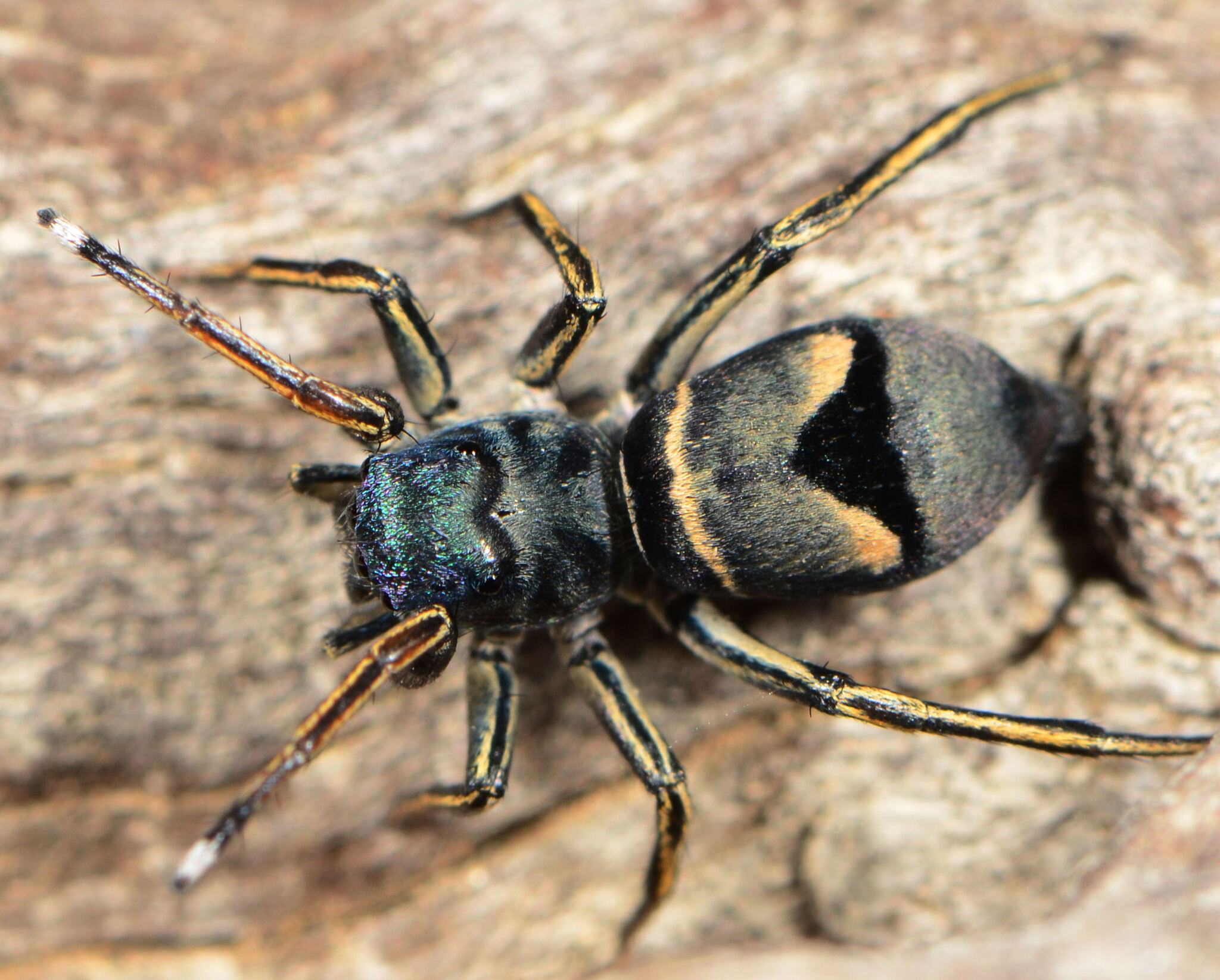
female

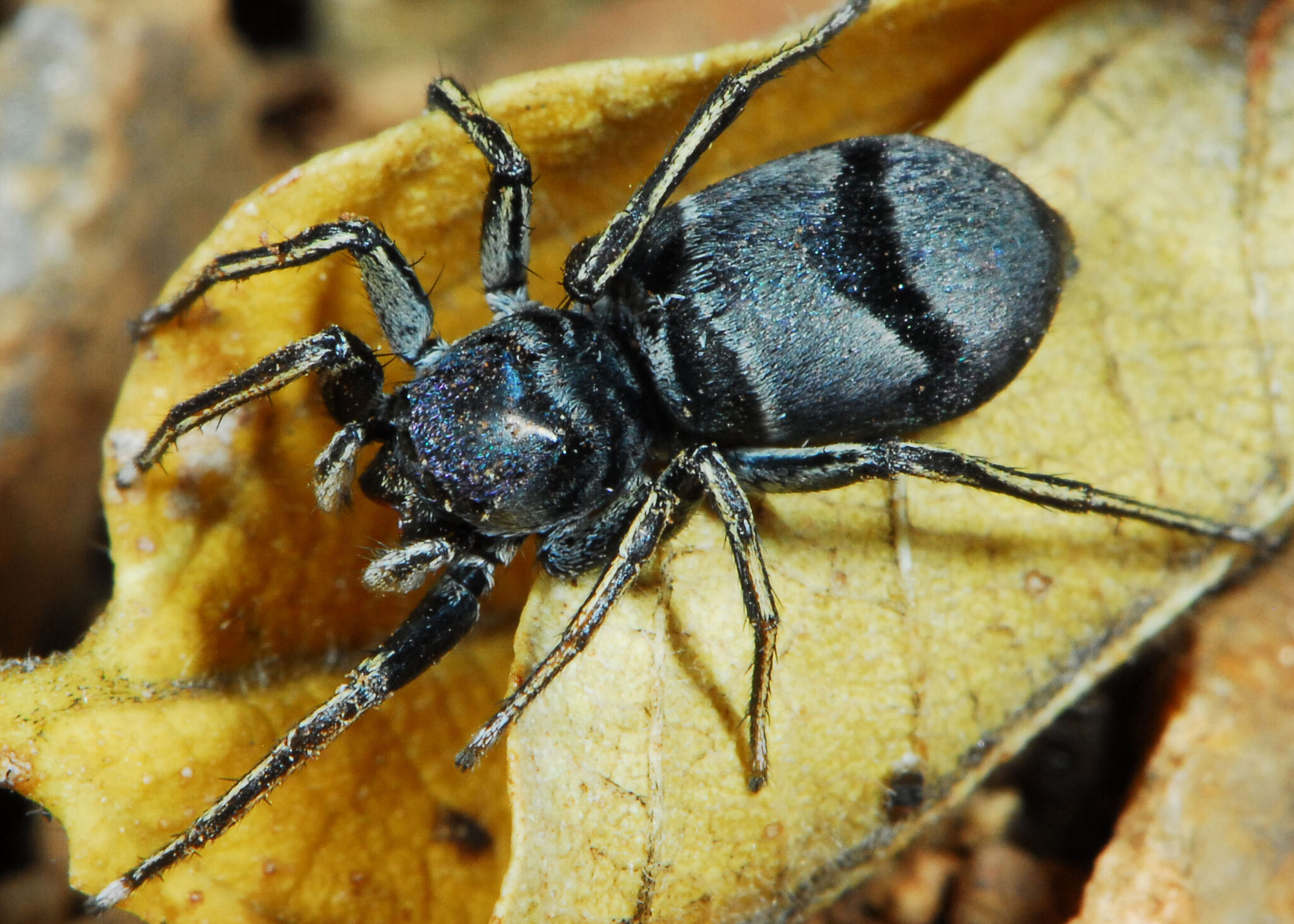
female

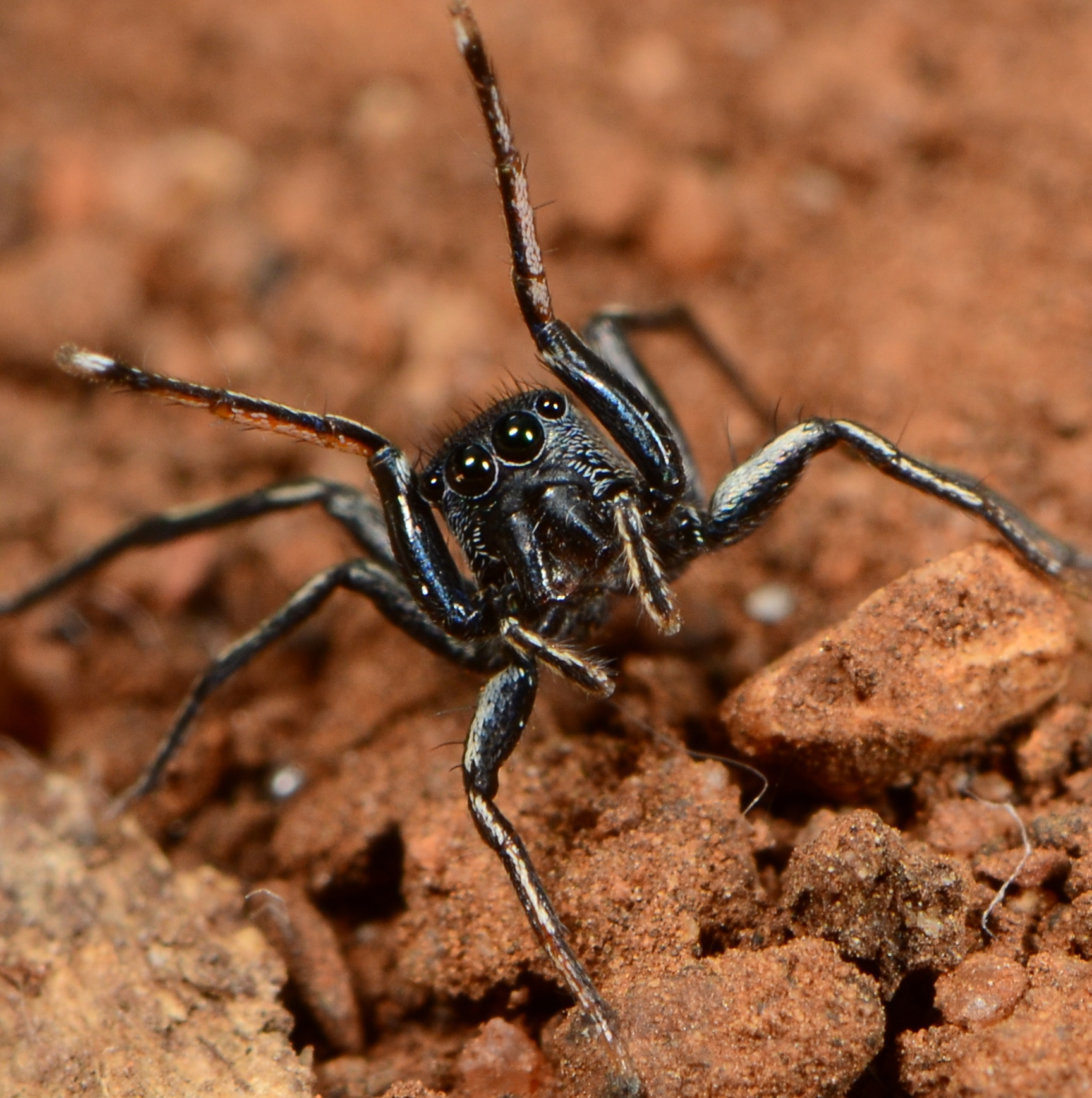
female
