= George and Elizabeth Peckham =

American entomologists

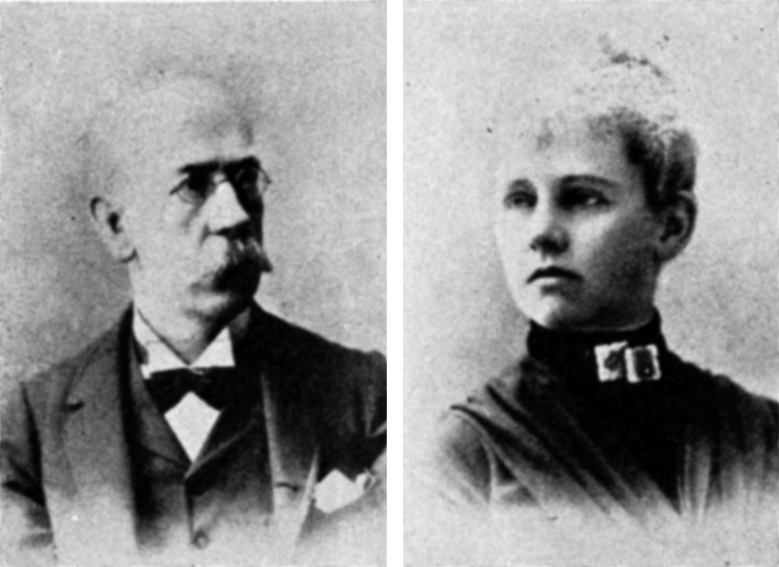
George and Elizabeth Peckham

George Williams Peckham (March 23, 1845 – January 10, 1914) and Elizabeth Maria Gifford Peckham (December 19, 1854 – February 11, 1940) were a married couple who were early American teachers, taxonomists, ethologists, arachnologists, and entomologists, specializing in animal behavior and in the study of jumping spiders (family Salticidae) and wasps.

== Lives and careers ==
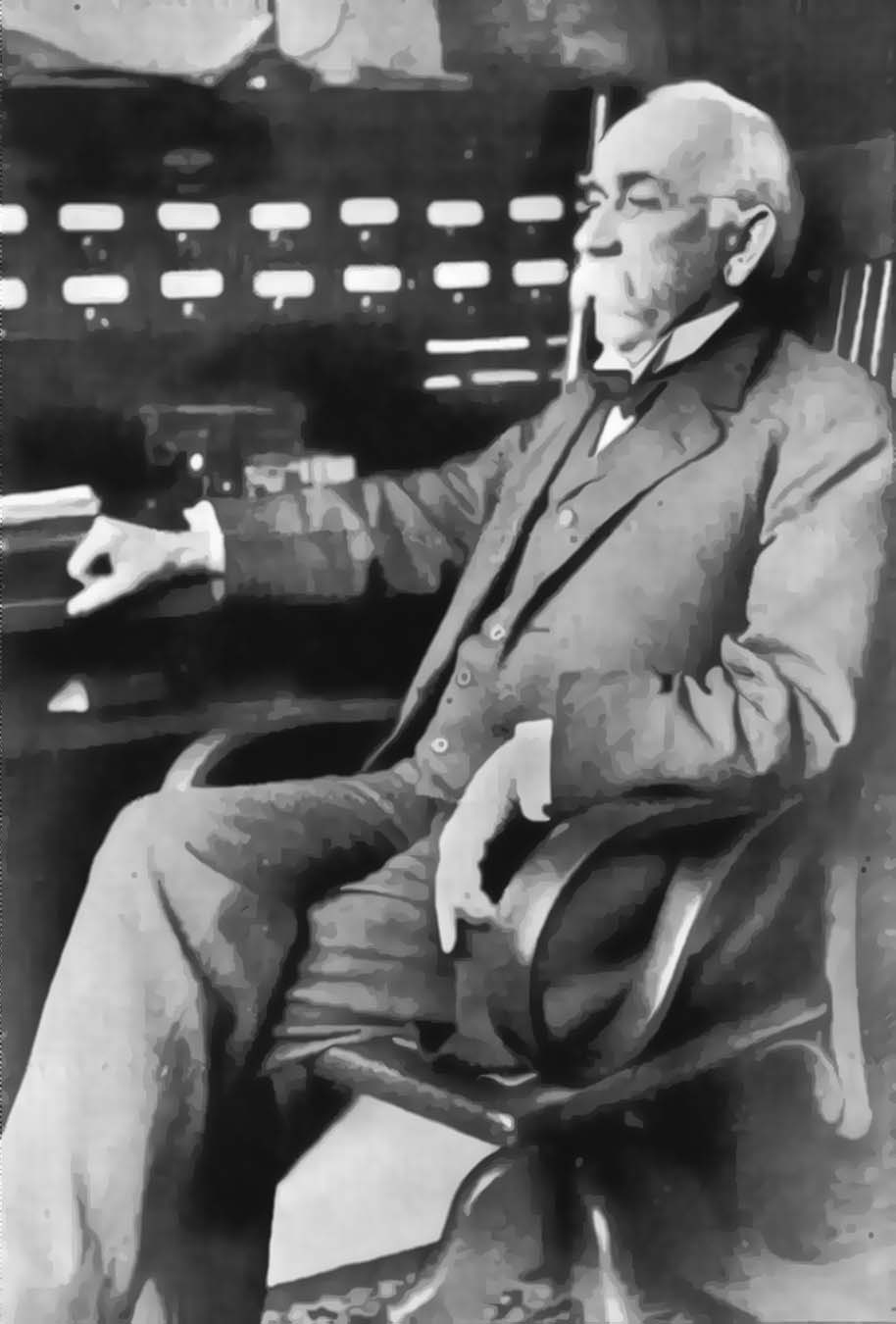
George Williams Peckham

George Peckham was born in Albany, New York in 1845. At age 18, he enlisted in the U.S. Army to fight in the American Civil War, reaching the rank of first lieutenant. After the war, he resumed his studies, obtaining a law degree from Albany Law School in 1867. After graduation, George worked at the law office of James T. Brown of Milwaukee. Not caring for the law, however, he became a student in the medical college of the University of Michigan, earning his M.D. in 1872. Rather than practice medicine, however, he chose to teach biology at East Division High School of Milwaukee, Wisconsin. In 1880, he organized the first American biological laboratory program in any high school, and in same year he married his colleague, Elizabeth Maria Gifford, one of the first science graduates from Vassar. In 1888, Peckham became principal of East Division, and in 1891, an inspector for the Wisconsin Department of Public Instruction. He also served during this period as president of the Wisconsin Academy of Sciences, Arts and Letters. In 1897, he became the director of the Milwaukee Public Library, in which position he served until retirement in 1910. He died on January 10, 1914, at the age of 68.

Elizabeth Maria Gifford (later Peckham) was born in Milwaukee, Wisconsin, in 1854, later using the abbreviated forename 'Bessie' amongst friends as attested to by her classmate Sara Fleming Sharpe. She graduated from Vassar College in 1876 and earned her master's degree in biology from Vassar in 1888 or 1889. Although her obituary records that her later interests took her elsewhere, she retained making notifications to Vassar alumnae. She was active in the women's suffrage movement both at the state and national level as recognised for "distinguished service" by the National American Womans' Suffrage Association, plus testified before legislative committees on several occasions. She served as one of the first librarians in the city of Milwaukee. After the death of her husband in 1914, she continued her scientific work and received a PhD from Cornell University in 1916. Elizabeth Peckham died of pneumonia on February 11, 1940, at the age of 85.

== Family ==
George W. Peckham and Elizabeth Maria Gifford were married in 1880. In an obituary (in 1940), their daughter Mary Peckham Gross writes of her parents marriage that "it was one of those perfect marriages of minds as well as hearts". Long before that, in 1914, a notification to Vassar alumnae (for class of 1876) records the birth of their grandson as "Born, August, 1914, a grandson George Peckham Gross, to Bessie Gifford Peckham", unfortunately several months after the death of his grandfather and apparent namesake George W. Peckham. In later years, Elizabeth M. Gifford-Peckham is recorded as living with her daughter Mary Peckham Gross, whose children were "a comfort and joy to her".

== Natural science studies ==
Together, they introduced Darwinian concepts into secondary education and began their studies on the taxonomy and behavior of jumping spiders (Salticidae), a large group of visually oriented spiders. They were among the earliest taxonomists to emphasize the value of behavior in classification. In 1889–1890, they published Observations on Sexual Selection in Spiders of the Family Attidae, and Additional Observations on Sexual Selection in Spiders of the Family Attidæ, with Some Remarks on Mr. Wallace's Theory of Sexual Ornamentation, among the first studies on sexual selection, supporting Darwin's concept against Wallace's alternative explanation of courtship behavior. In 1898, they produced On the Instincts and Habits of the Solitary Wasps, a work considered a scientific classic for its style, as well as its scholarship. Unlike the later work of Fabre, which praised the supposed "perfection" of insect behavior, the Peckhams identified series of behaviors that were subject to natural selection. In 1905 they published a revised and enlarged edition entitled Wasps, Solitary and Social.

The Peckhams were lifetime collaborators, as researchers and educators. From 1883 to 1909, they described 63 genera and 366 species. The North American Peckham Society is named after them. It is dedicated to salticid research; its irregular publication is titled Peckhamia.

== Travels ==
Prior to later 1885, the Peckhams appear to have spent time in eastern Guatemala, as attested to in a series of papers on jumping spiders of the zone, culminating in a statement given in Peckham & Peckham 1896 (Attidae from Central America and Mexico) as "a large part of our collection we made ourselves in Guatemala and Honduras". They may also have collected some specimens themselves in Mexico, such as a few specimens in MCZ are labelled as "Frontera". In November 1912, the Alumnae Bulletin of Vassar reports that "Elizabeth Gifford Peckham and her husband spent last winter in Mexico".

=== Taxa named after the Peckhams ===
The salticid genus Peckhamia is named in their honor, along with at least 20 species and one subspecies:

- Cicurina peckhami (Simon, 1898)
- Acragas peckhami (Chickering, 1946)
- Bellota peckhami Galiano, 1978
- Chapoda peckhami Banks, 1929
- Compsodecta peckhami Bryant, 1943
- Corythalia peckhami Petrunkevitch, 1914
- Goleta peckhami Simon, 1900
- Habrocestum peckhami Rainbow, 1899
- Habronattus peckhami (Banks, 1921)
- Hasarius peckhami Petrunkevitch, 1914
- Heliophanus peckhami Simon, 1902
- Hyllus brevitarsis peckhamorum Berland & Millot, 1941
- Myrmarachne peckhami Roewer, 1951
- Pachomius peckhamorum Galiano, 1994
- Pelegrina peckhamorum (Kaston, 1973)
- Pensacola peckhami Bryant, 1943
- Salticus peckhamae (Cockerell, 1897)
- Telamonia peckhami Thorell, 1891
- Thiodina peckhami (Bryant, 1940)
- Uroballus peckhami Zabka, 1985
- Viciria peckhamorum Lessert, 1927

== Tributes ==
In addition to the various taxa named after them, in 1929, Milwaukee Public Schools built a new junior high school, which was named Peckham Junior High School. The name was changed in the early 1970s to honor Jackie Robinson. It was shut down in 2005, and converted to apartments in 2011–2012 with the help of historic preservation tax credits.
