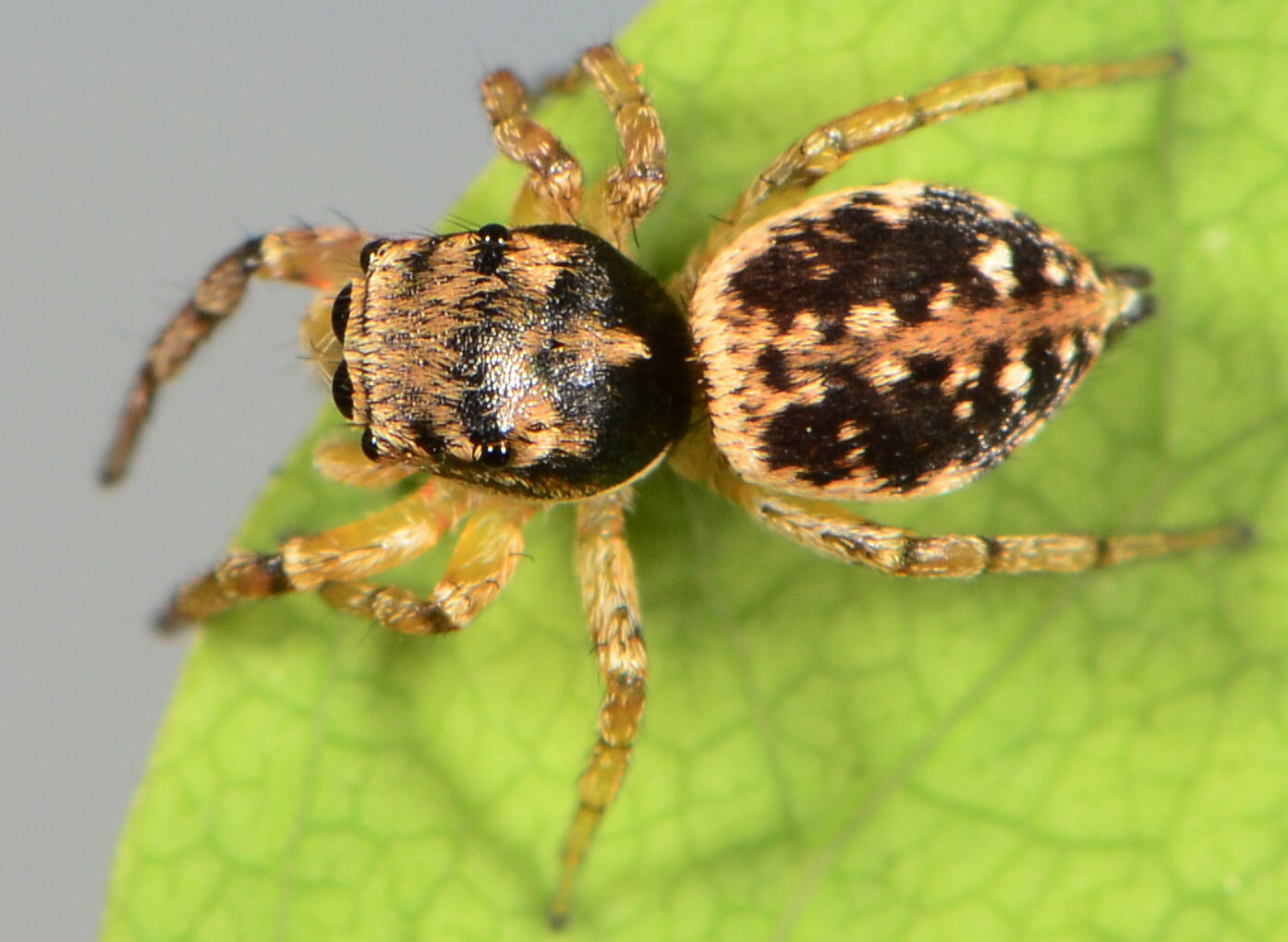
- female
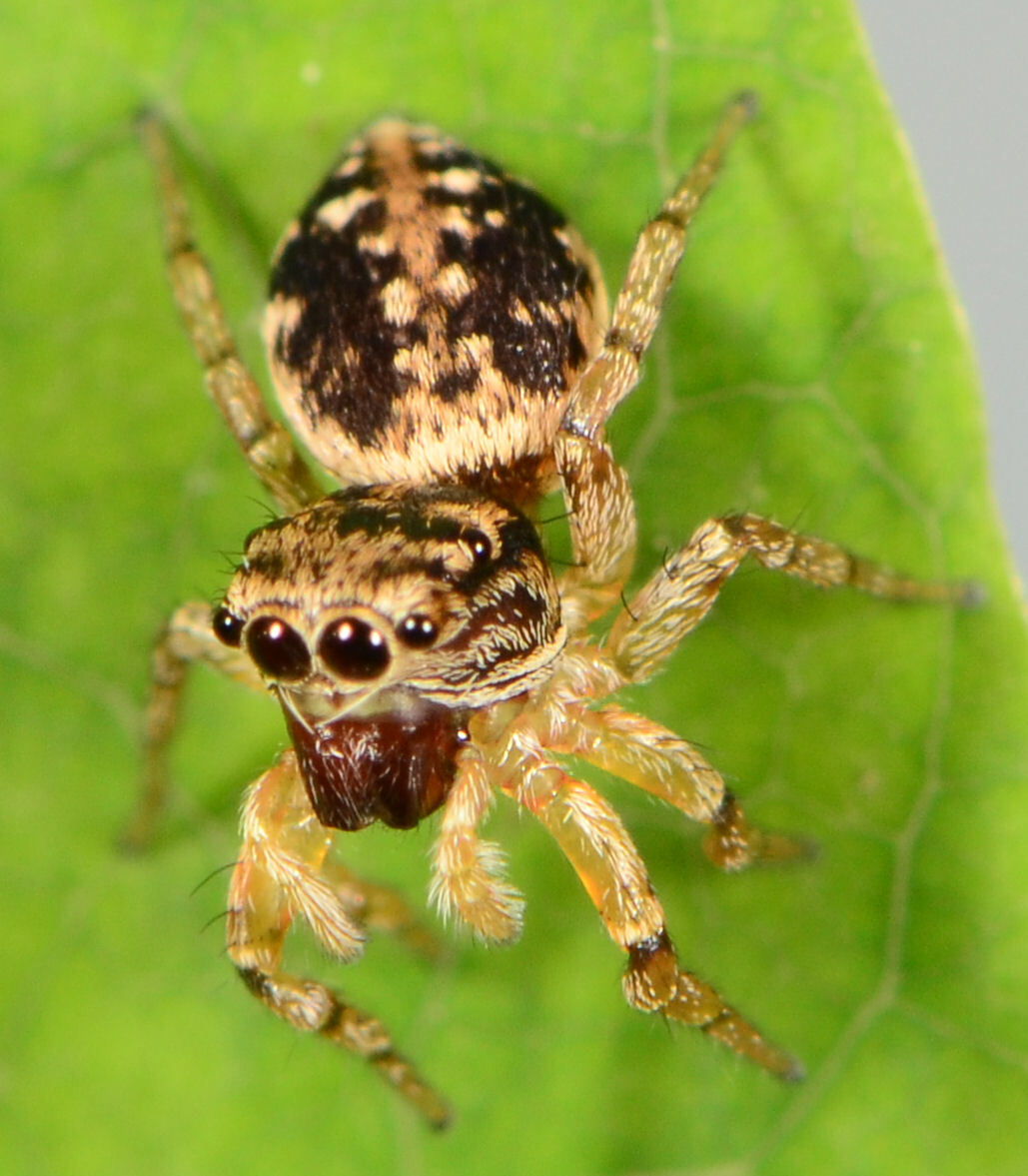
- female

Scientific classification
- Kingdom: Animalia
- Phylum: Arthropoda
- Subphylum: Chelicerata
- Class: Arachnida
- Order: Araneae
- Infraorder: Araneomorphae
- Family: Salticidae
- Genus: Helafricanus
- Species: H. demonstrativus

Binomial name
- Helafricanus demonstrativus (Wesołowska, 1986)

Synonyms
- Heliophanus demonstrativus Wesołowska, 1986

= Helafricanus demonstrativus =

Spotted Helafricanus Sunny Jumping Spider

Species of spider

Helafricanus demonstrativus is a species of spider in the family Salticidae. It is endemic to Africa and is commonly known as the spotted Helafricanus sunny jumping spider.

== Distribution ==
Helafricanus demonstrativus is found in Botswana, Lesotho, Mozambique, South Africa, Tanzania, and Zimbabwe.

In South Africa, it is known from six provinces. Notable locations include Addo Elephant National Park, East London, Grahamstown, Jeffrey's Bay, Mkhambathi Nature Reserve, Ezemvelo Nature Reserve, Kruger National Park, Lephalale, Polokwane Nature Reserve, and Ophathe Game Reserve.

== Habitat and ecology ==
Helafricanus demonstrativus is a free-living plant-dwelling spider found on vegetation and in litter in the Grassland, Savanna, and Thicket biomes at altitudes ranging from 1 to 1,744 m. The species has been occasionally sampled from rocks.

== Description ==
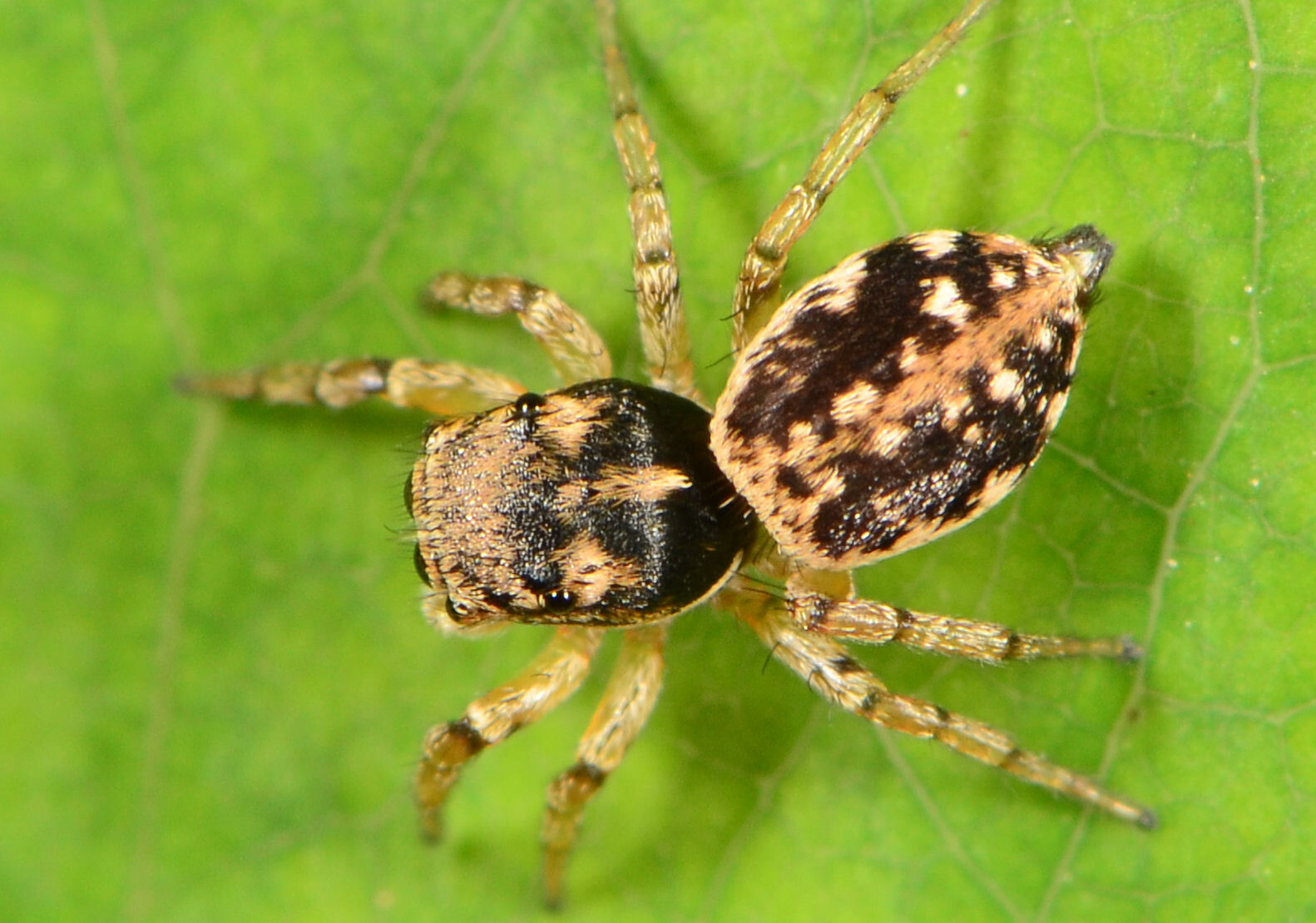
female

The males exhibit an abdominal pattern similar to females.

== Conservation ==
Helafricanus demonstrativus is listed as Least Concern by the South African National Biodiversity Institute due to its wide geographical range. It is found in more than eight protected areas.

== Taxonomy ==
Helafricanus demonstrativus was originally described as a member of genus Heliophanus by Wesołowska in 1986 from East London in the Eastern Cape. Additional data was added by Wesołowska in 2003, and the species was transferred to Helafricanus by Wesołowska in 2024.
