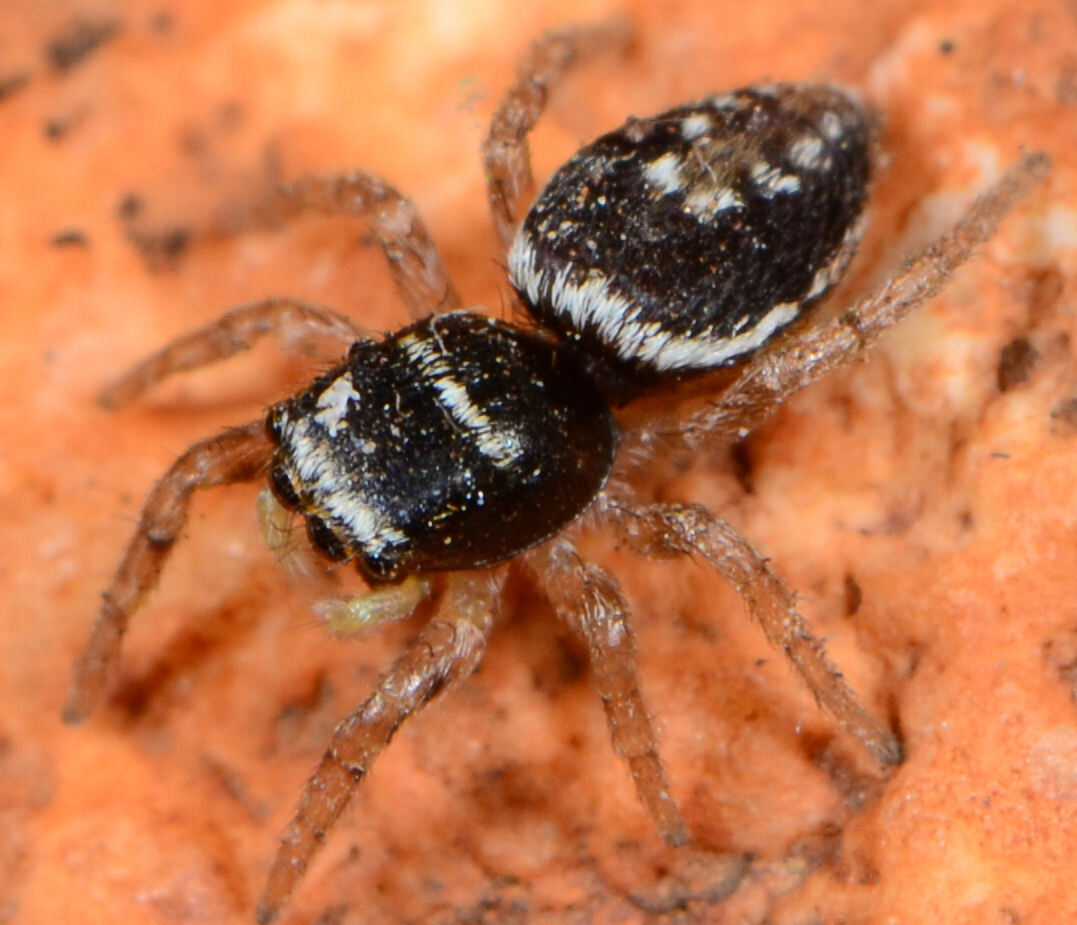
- female
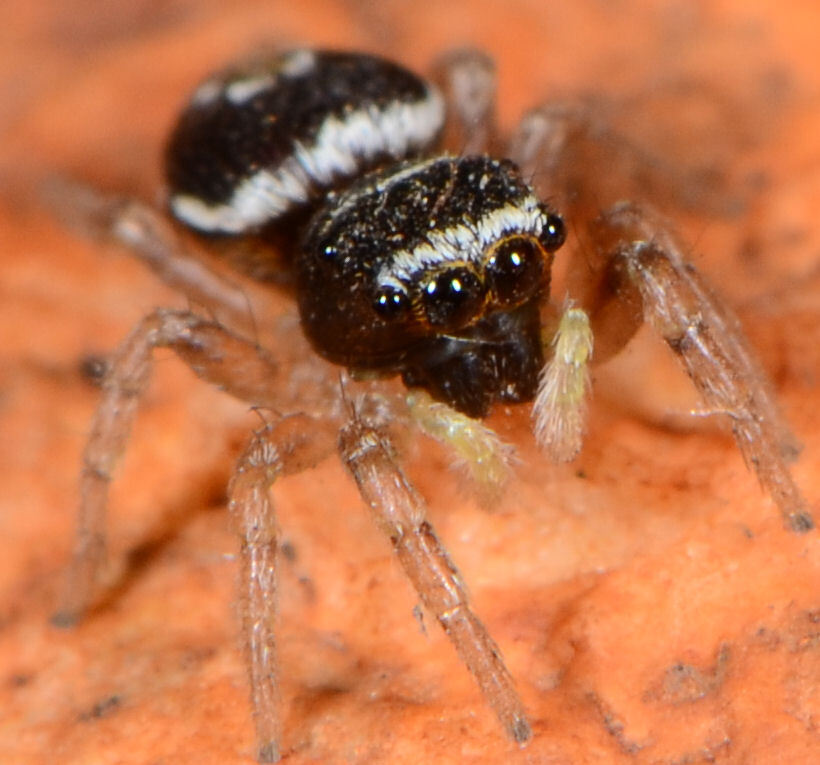
- female

Scientific classification
- Kingdom: Animalia
- Phylum: Arthropoda
- Subphylum: Chelicerata
- Class: Arachnida
- Order: Araneae
- Infraorder: Araneomorphae
- Family: Salticidae
- Genus: Helafricanus
- Species: H. nanus

Binomial name
- Helafricanus nanus (Wesołowska, 2003)

Synonyms
- Heliophanus nanus Wesołowska, 2003

= Helafricanus nanus =

Small Helafricanus Sunny Jumping Spider

Species of spider

Helafricanus nanus is a species of spider in the family Salticidae. It is endemic to southern Africa and is commonly known as the small Helafricanus sunny jumping spider.

== Distribution ==
Helafricanus nanus is found in Namibia and South Africa.

In South Africa, it is known from seven provinces. Notable locations include Grahamstown, Hogsback, Jeffrey's Bay, and Bloemfontein.

== Habitat and ecology ==
Helafricanus nanus is a plant-dwelling species collected from grasses and shrubs in the Grassland and Thicket biomes at altitudes ranging from 565 to 2,329 m. The species was also found in cotton, potato, and tomato fields and pecan nut orchards.

== Description ==
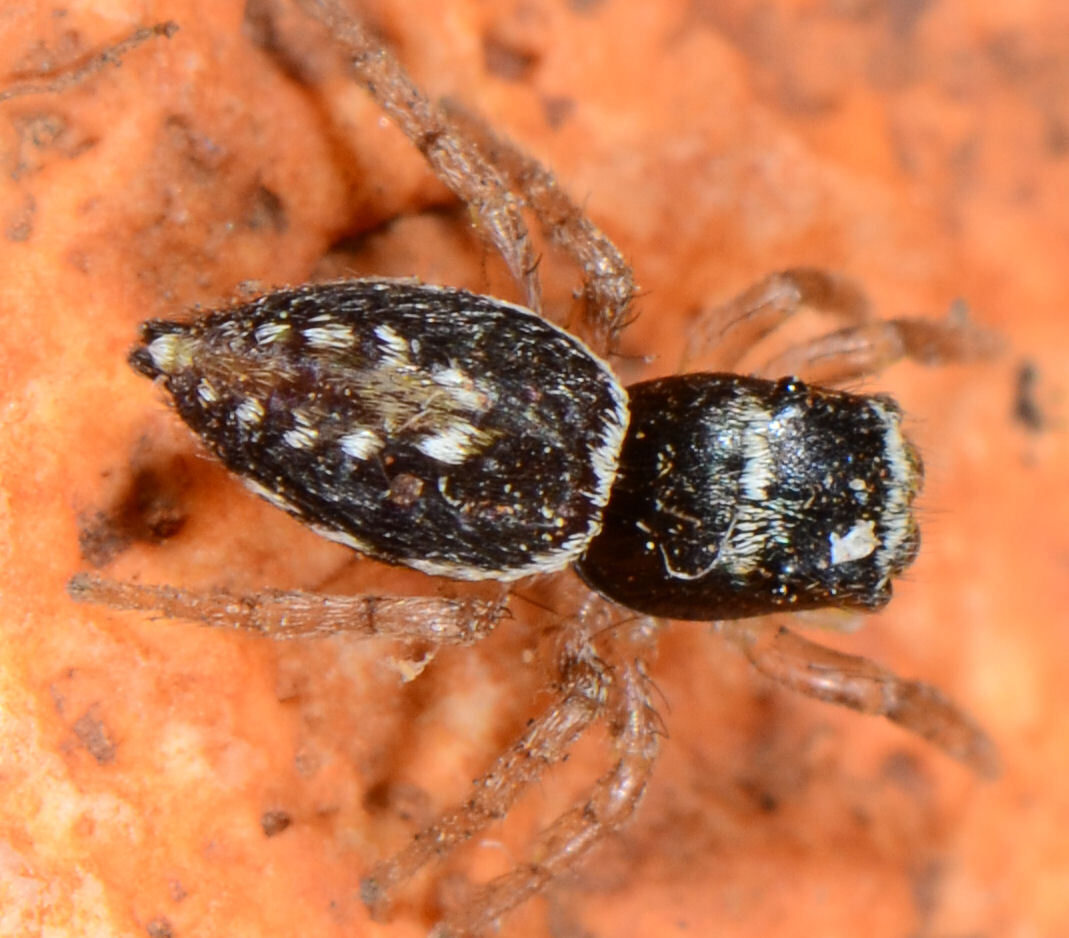
female

== Conservation ==
Helafricanus nanus is listed as Least Concern by the South African National Biodiversity Institute due to its wide range. It has been sampled in more than ten protected areas.

== Etymology ==
The specific name "nanus" is Latin for "dwarf", a name often used for particularly small species.

== Taxonomy ==
Helafricanus nanus was originally described in genus Heliophanus by Wesołowska in 2003 from Swartrus in the Free State. The species was transferred to Helafricanus by Wesołowska in 2024.
