= Helafricanus bisulcus =

Scientific classification
- Kingdom: Animalia
- Phylum: Arthropoda
- Subphylum: Chelicerata
- Class: Arachnida
- Order: Araneae
- Infraorder: Araneomorphae
- Family: Salticidae
- Genus: Helafricanus
- Species: H. bisulcus

Binomial name
- Helafricanus bisulcus (Wesołowska, 1986)

Synonyms
- Heliophanus bisulcus Wesołowska, 1986; Heliophanus villosus Wesołowska, 1986

Species of spider

Helafricanus bisulcus is a jumping spider species in the genus Helafricanus. It was first described by Wanda Wesołowska in 1986 as Heliophanus bisulcus and is found in Namibia and South Africa.

== Distribution ==
Helafricanus bisulcus is found in Namibia and South Africa.

In South Africa, it is known from the Western Cape. Notable locations include Cape Agulhas, Cape Town, Fernkloof Nature Reserve, Jacobsbaai, Robben Island, Table Mountain National Park at Signal Hill, and Yzerfontein.

== Habitat and ecology ==
Helafricanus bisulcus is a free-living plant-dwelling spider. Some specimens were found in the intertidal zone along rocky seashores, nested in crevices in rocks close to the seashore and nesting in the succulent Salicornia, a dominant vegetation component along rocky shores. The species inhabits the Fynbos biome at altitudes ranging from 7 to 71 m.

== Taxonomy ==
Helafricanus bisulcus was originally described by Wesołowska in 1986. What had been designated the species Heliophanus villosus was recognised as the female of this species in 2003. The species was redescribed by Haddad and Wesołowska in 2013 and transferred to Helafricanus by Wesołowska in 2024.

== Conservation ==
Helafricanus bisulcus is listed as Least Concern by the South African National Biodiversity Institute due to its wide range in southern Africa. It is protected in Table Mountain National Park and Fernkloof Nature Reserve.
