= Helafricanus marshalli =

Marshall's Helafricanus Sunny Jumping Spider

Scientific classification
- Kingdom: Animalia
- Phylum: Arthropoda
- Subphylum: Chelicerata
- Class: Arachnida
- Order: Araneae
- Infraorder: Araneomorphae
- Family: Salticidae
- Genus: Helafricanus
- Species: H. marshalli

Binomial name
- Helafricanus marshalli (G. W. Peckham & E. G. Peckham, 1903)

Synonyms
- Heliophanus marshallii Peckham & Peckham, 1903; Heliophanus marshalli Wesołowska, 1986

Species of spider

Helafricanus marshalli is a species of spider in the family Salticidae. It is endemic to South Africa and is commonly known as Marshall's Helafricanus sunny jumping spider.

== Distribution ==
Helafricanus marshalli is found in South Africa, where it is known only from the Kwazulu-Natal province. Known locations include Durban and Kloof near Durban.

== Habitat and ecology ==
Helafricanus marshalli has been sampled from the Indian Ocean Coastal Belt biome at an altitude of 17 m.

== Description ==
The species is larger than other congeners and has dark legs with yellow tarsi.

== Conservation ==
Helafricanus marshalli is listed as Data Deficient by the South African National Biodiversity Institute due to its small range. More sampling is needed to collect the female and determine the species' range.

== Taxonomy ==
Helafricanus marshalli was originally described by G. W. Peckham and E. G. Peckham in 1903. The species was redescribed by Wesołowska in 1986 and transferred to Helafricanus by Wesołowska in 2024. Only the male is known.
