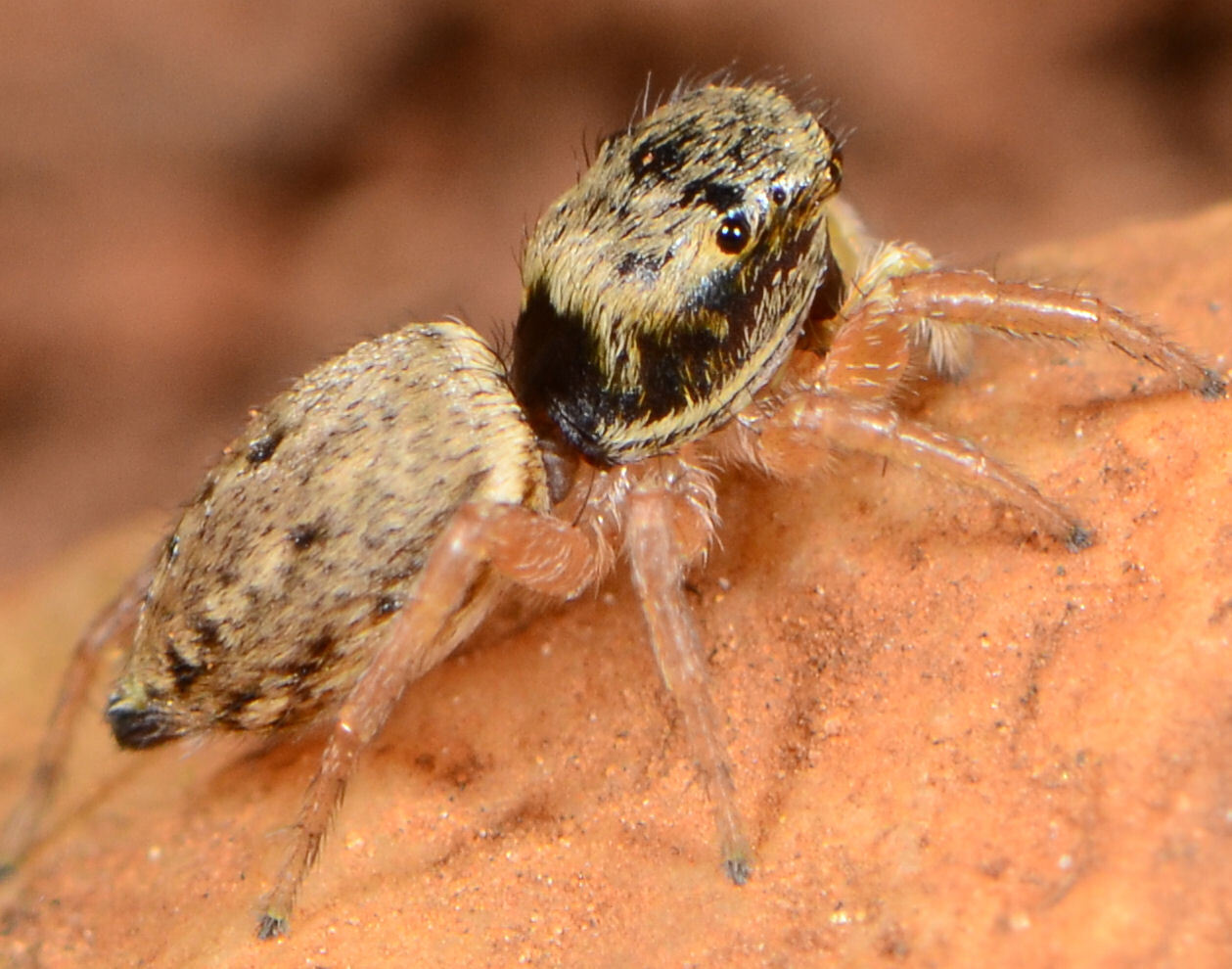
- female

Scientific classification
- Kingdom: Animalia
- Phylum: Arthropoda
- Subphylum: Chelicerata
- Class: Arachnida
- Order: Araneae
- Infraorder: Araneomorphae
- Family: Salticidae
- Genus: Helafricanus
- Species: H. trepidus

Binomial name
- Helafricanus trepidus (Simon, 1910)

Synonyms
- Heliophanus trepidus Simon, 1910; Heliophanus tropicus Roewer, 1955

= Helafricanus trepidus =

Namibia's Helafricanus Sunny Jumping Spider

Species of spider

Helafricanus trepidus is a species of spider in the family Salticidae. It is endemic to southern Africa and is commonly known as Namibia's Helafricanus sunny jumping spider.

== Distribution ==
Helafricanus trepidus is found in Angola, Botswana, Namibia, South Africa, and Zimbabwe.

In South Africa, it is known from eight provinces.

== Habitat and ecology ==
Helafricanus trepidus was sampled from shrubs and trees from the Fynbos, Grassland, Indian Ocean Coastal Belt, Nama Karoo, and Savanna biomes at altitudes ranging from 6 to 1,444 m. In Ndumo Game Reserve, it was collected from the bark of Vachellia xanthophloea. The species was also recorded from agroecosystems such as cotton and pistachio orchards.

== Conservation ==
Helafricanus trepidus is listed as Least Concern by the South African National Biodiversity Institute due to its wide geographical range. In South Africa, it is conserved in 10 protected areas.

== Taxonomy ==
Helafricanus trepidus was originally described by Simon in 1910 from Namibia. The species was redescribed by Wesołowska and Cumming in 2008. Additional data was added by Wesołowska and Haddad in 2014. The species was transferred to Helafricanus by Wesołowska in 2024.
