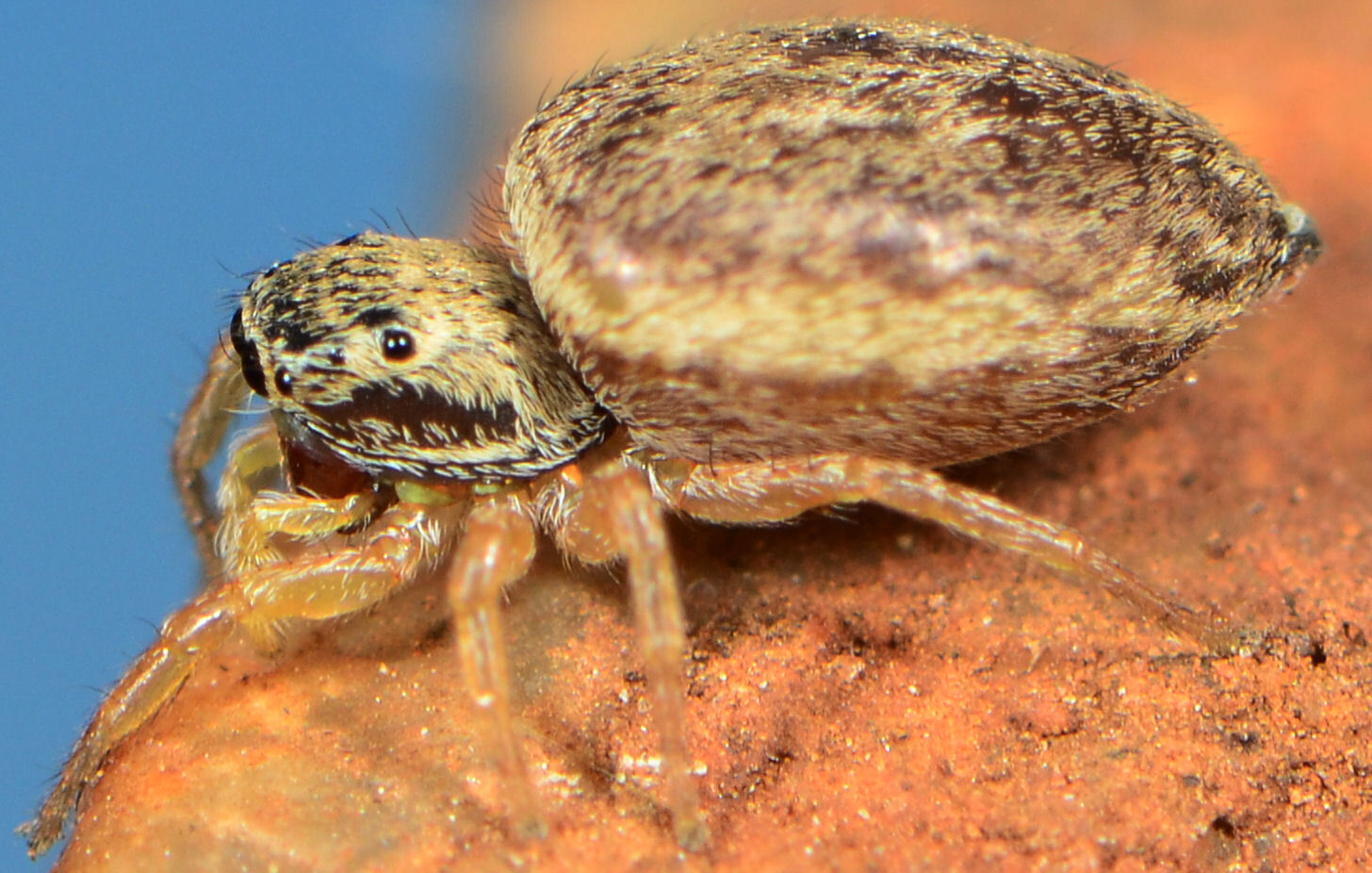
- female
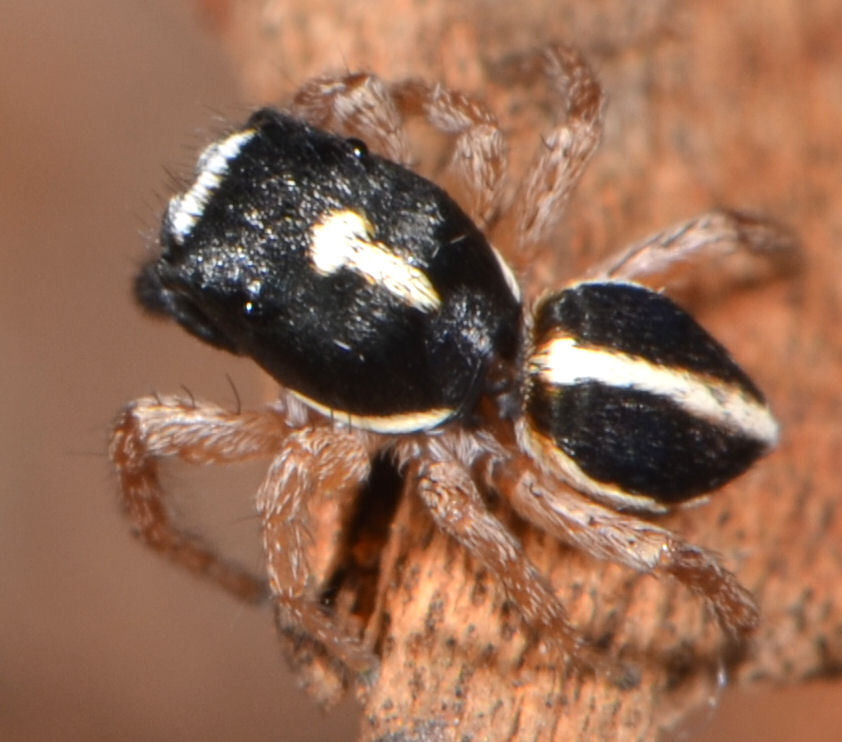
- male

Scientific classification
- Kingdom: Animalia
- Phylum: Arthropoda
- Subphylum: Chelicerata
- Class: Arachnida
- Order: Araneae
- Infraorder: Araneomorphae
- Family: Salticidae
- Genus: Helafricanus
- Species: H. debilis

Binomial name
- Helafricanus debilis (Simon, 1901)

Synonyms
- Heliophanus debilis Simon, 1901

= Helafricanus debilis =

Common Helafricanus Sunny Jumping Spider

Species of spider

Helafricanus debilis is a species of spider in the family Salticidae. It is endemic to Africa and is commonly known as the common Helafricanus sunny jumping spider.

== Distribution ==
Helafricanus debilis is found in Angola, Botswana, Democratic Republic of the Congo, Lesotho, Malawi, Mozambique, Namibia, South Africa, Tanzania, and Zimbabwe.

In South Africa, the species has a wide range and is known from all the provinces.

== Habitat and ecology ==
Helafricanus debilis is a free-living plant-dwelling spider. Specimens were occasionally collected from low-growing herbaceous plants and from rocks and logs on the ground surface. In South Africa, it has been sampled from the Fynbos, Forest, Grassland, Nama Karoo, Indian Ocean Coastal Belt, Savanna, and Thicket biomes at altitudes ranging from 3 to 1,836 m. The species has also been sampled from agroecosystems such as cotton and pistachio.

In Ndumo Game Reserve, the species was frequently collected from bark of the fever tree Vachellia xanthophloea along various pans and floodplains, where silk retreats were constructed beneath the bark structure. Adults were occasionally seen foraging on the tree trunks.

== Description ==
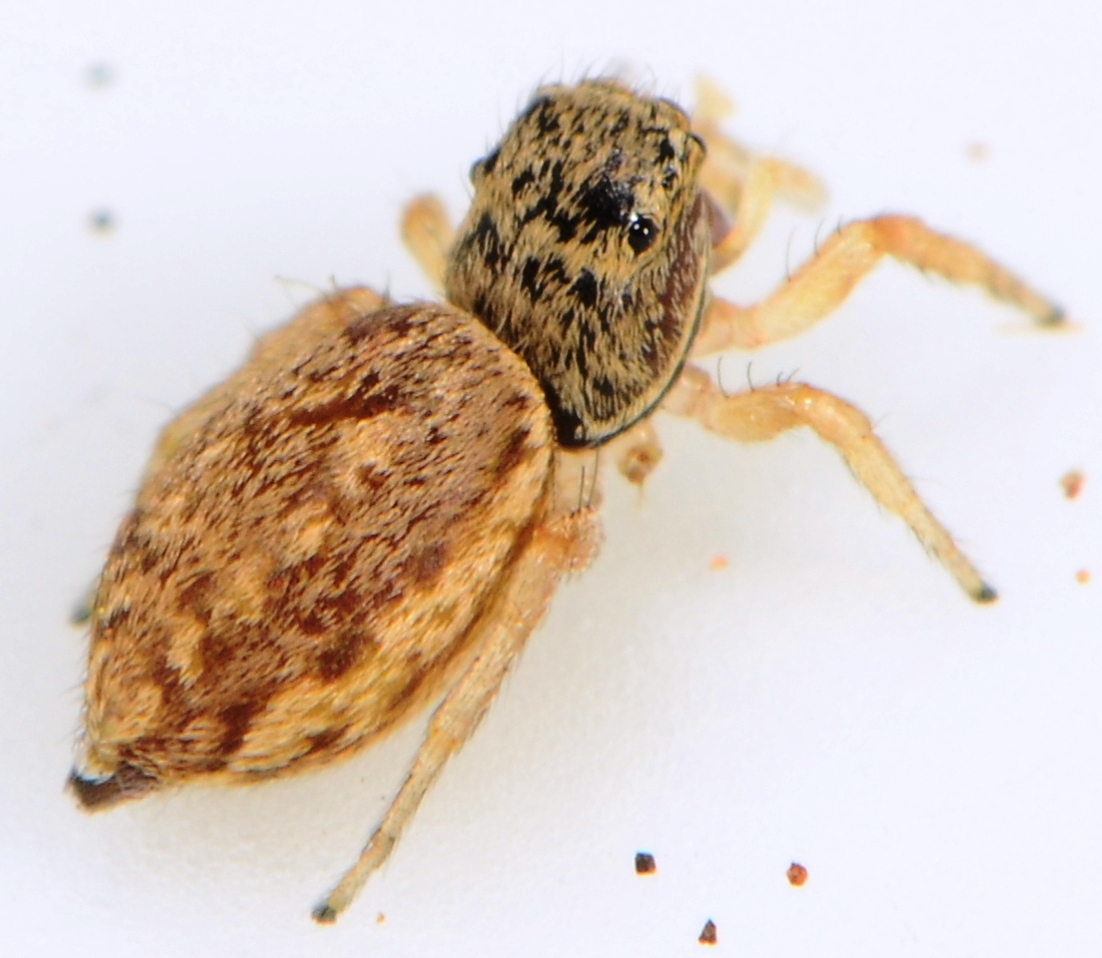
female

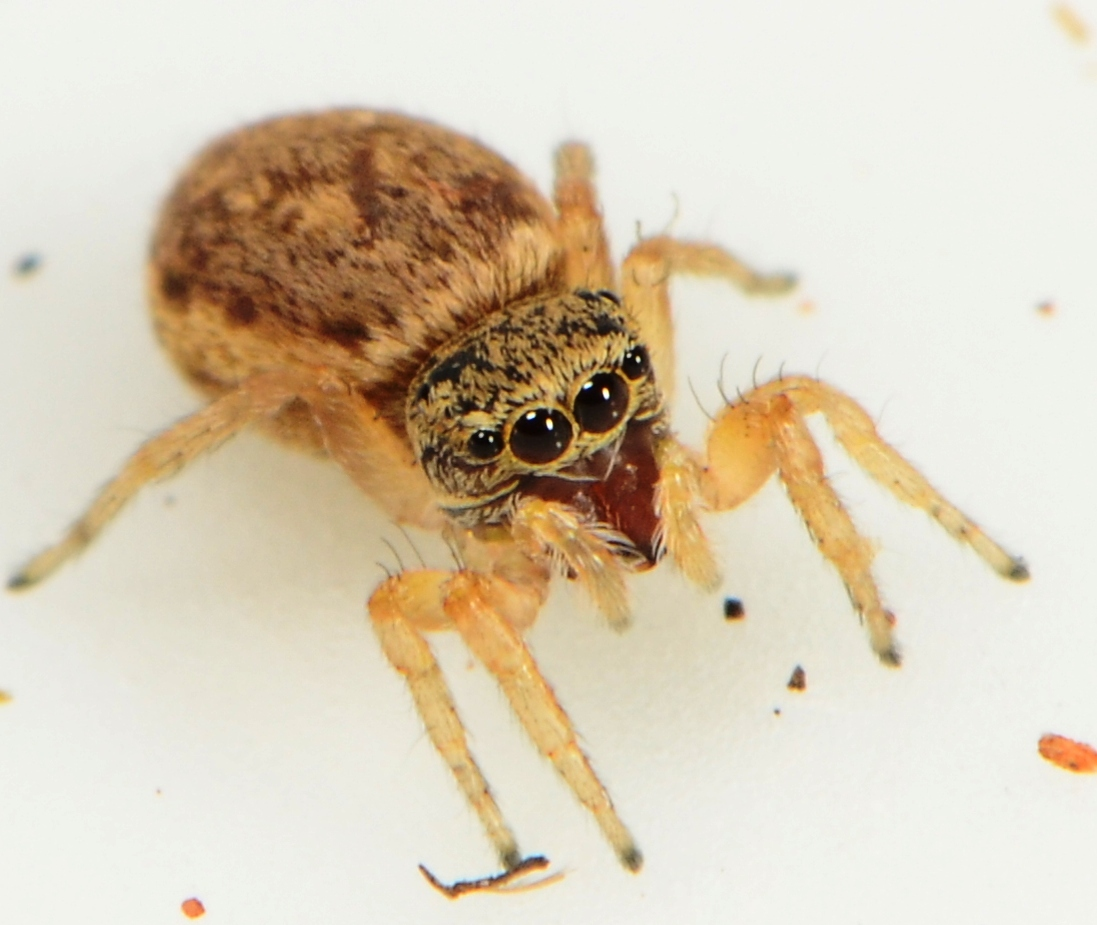
female

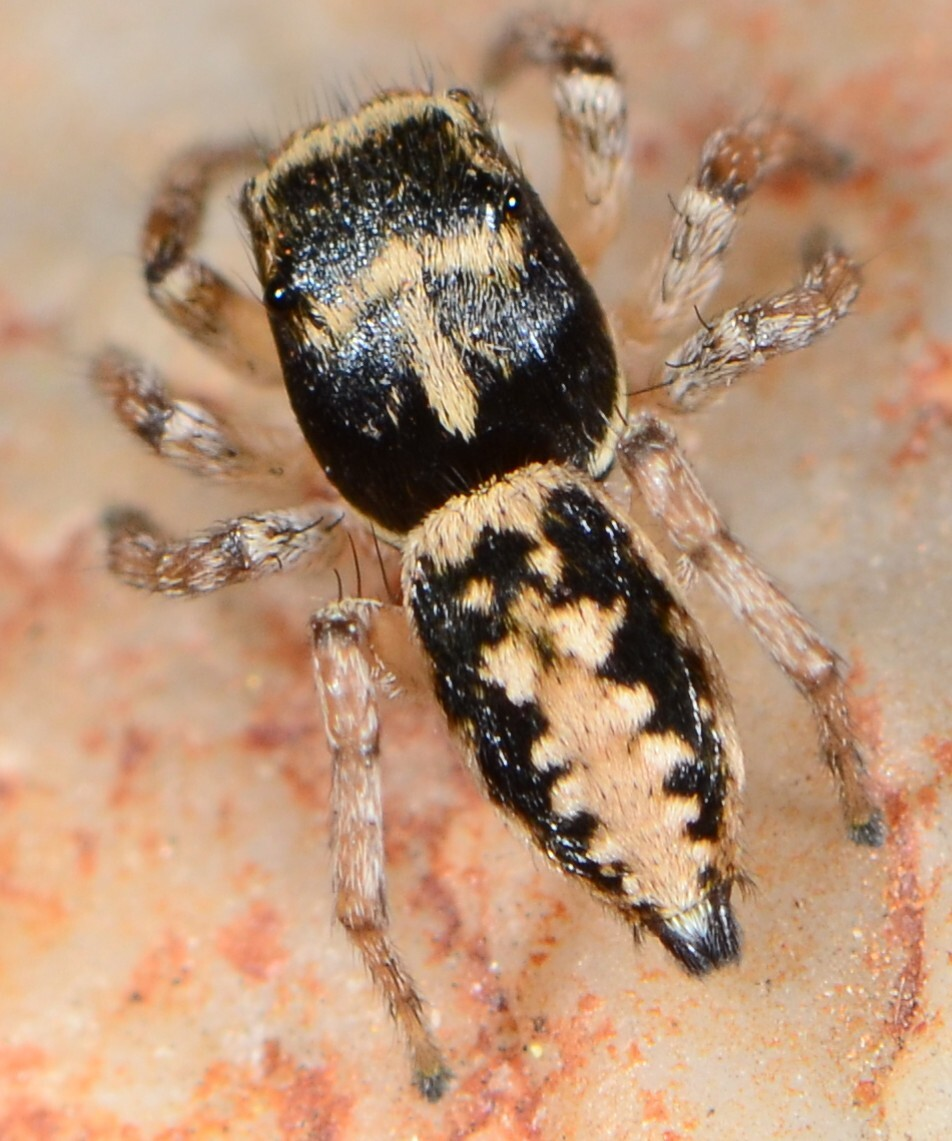
female

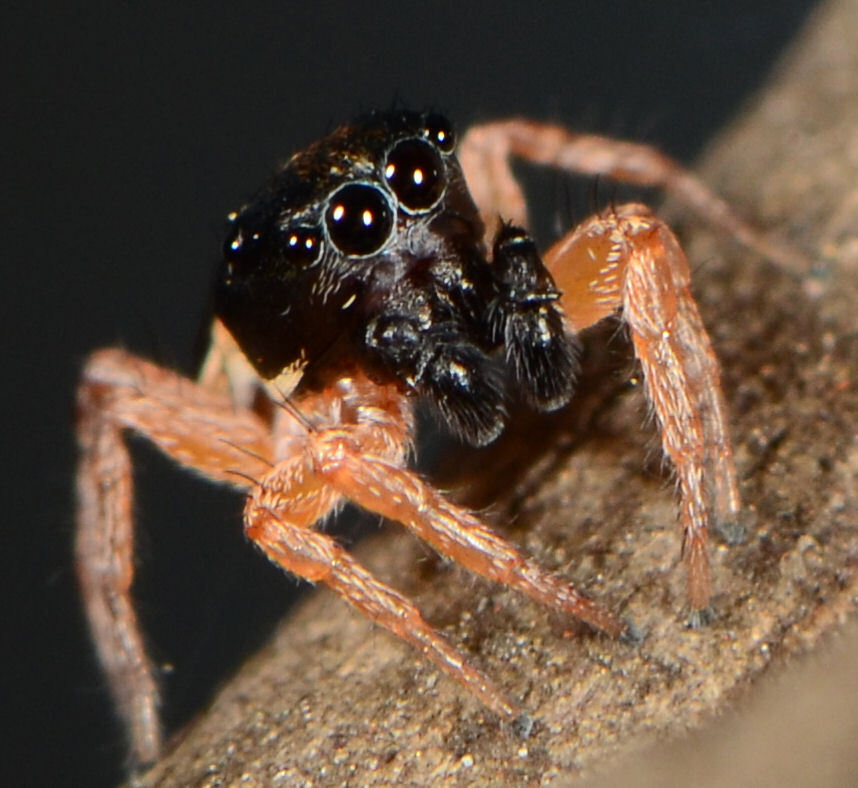
male

== Conservation ==
Helafricanus debilis is listed as Least Concern by the South African National Biodiversity Institute due to its wide geographical range. It is found in more than 20 protected areas.

== Taxonomy ==
Helafricanus debilis was originally described by Simon in 1901 from Kimberley, South Africa. The species was revised by Wesołowska in 1986, redescribed by Wesołowska and Haddad in 2009, and transferred to Helafricanus by Wesołowska in 2024.
