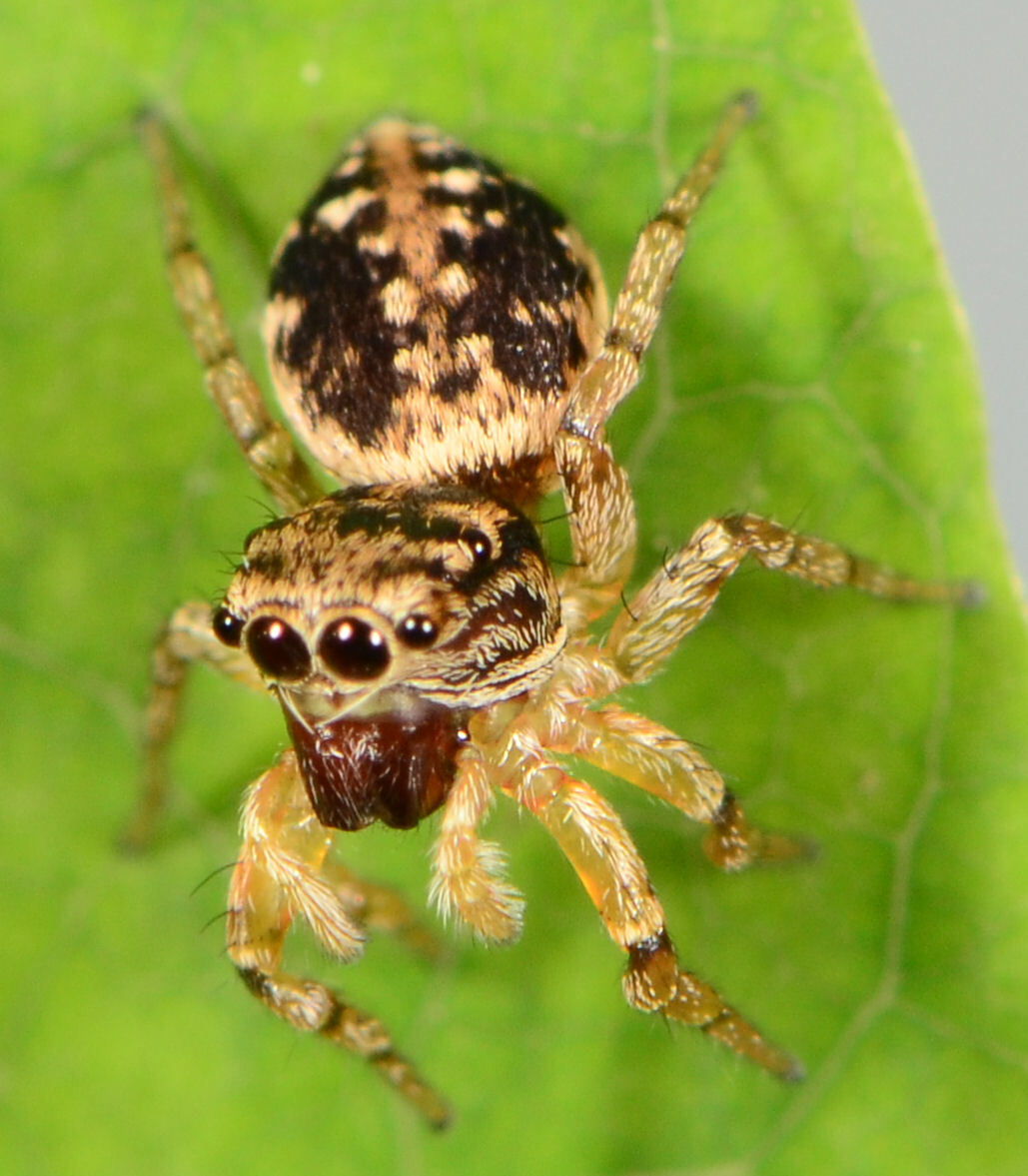
- female H. demonstrativus
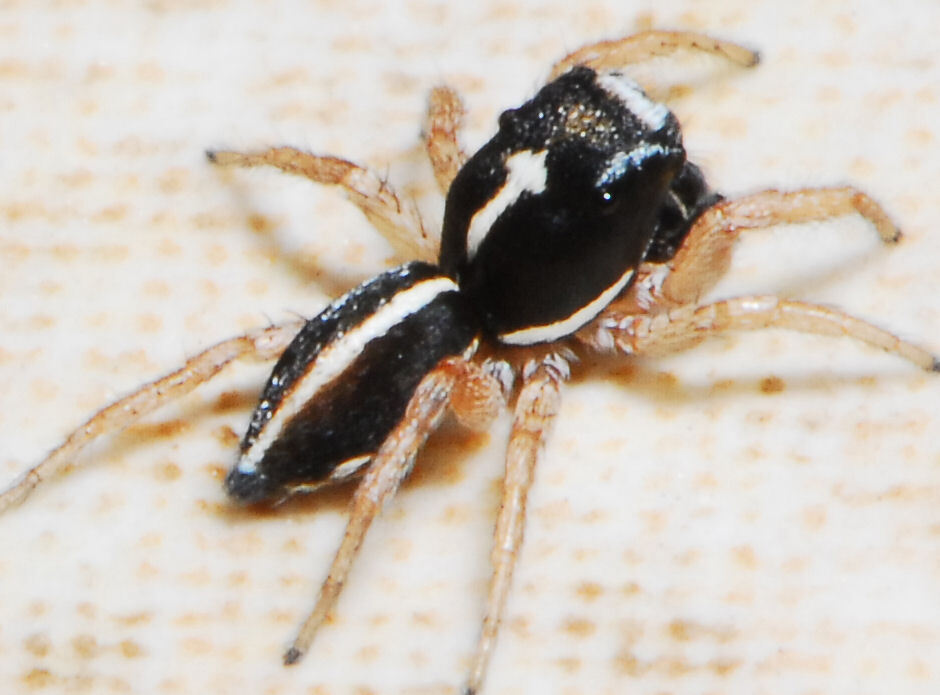
- male H. pistaciae

Scientific classification
- Kingdom: Animalia
- Phylum: Arthropoda
- Subphylum: Chelicerata
- Class: Arachnida
- Order: Araneae
- Infraorder: Araneomorphae
- Family: Salticidae
- Subfamily: Salticinae
- Genus: Helafricanus; Wesołowska, 1986

Type species
- Heliophanus patellaris Simon, 1901

Species
- See text.

Synonyms
- Heliophanus

= Helafricanus =

Genus of spiders

Helafricanus is an African genus of the spider family Salticidae (jumping spiders).

== Distribution ==
Most species in this genus are endemic to Africa, with two species reaching the Arabic Peninsula and one Iran.

== Life style ==
These are free-living spiders found on the ground or plants, collected from a broad range of habitats.

== Description ==
The genus Helafricanus comprises small to medium-sized spiders, measuring 2.5 to 4.5 mm.

Males have a black carapace, in some species with a thin whitish median streak. The abdomen is black, usually with a white leaf-like pattern or a median stripe, sometimes also featuring a thin white line along the lateral edges of the body.

Females have mottled brown and black colouration and an abdominal pattern comprising a light central stripe composed of several pairs of merging spots. Notably, some males exhibit an abdominal pattern similar to females.

Light streaks and patches are composed of white hairs. The diagnostic character of Helafricanus males is the presence of a large palpal patellar apophysis. The structure of the female genital organs is similar in all congeners, with the copulatory openings usually placed at the posterior part of the epigyne.

== Taxonomy ==
The genus Helafricanus was elevated from a subgenus of Heliophanus C. L. Koch, 1833 by Wesołowska in 2024. The type species is Helafricanus patellaris (Simon, 1901). Fourteen species are known from South Africa.

== Species ==
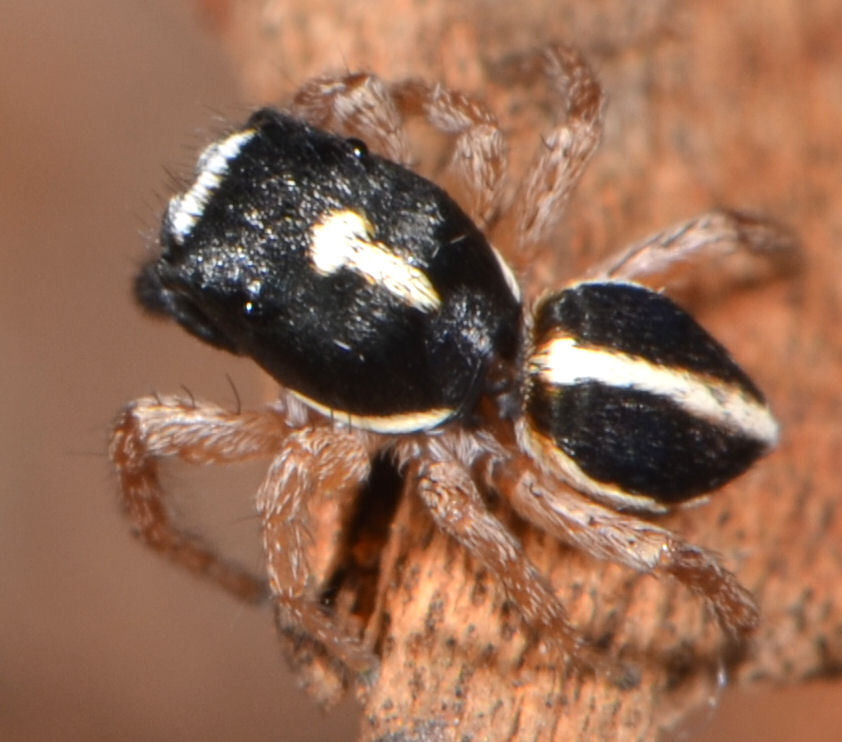
male H. debilis

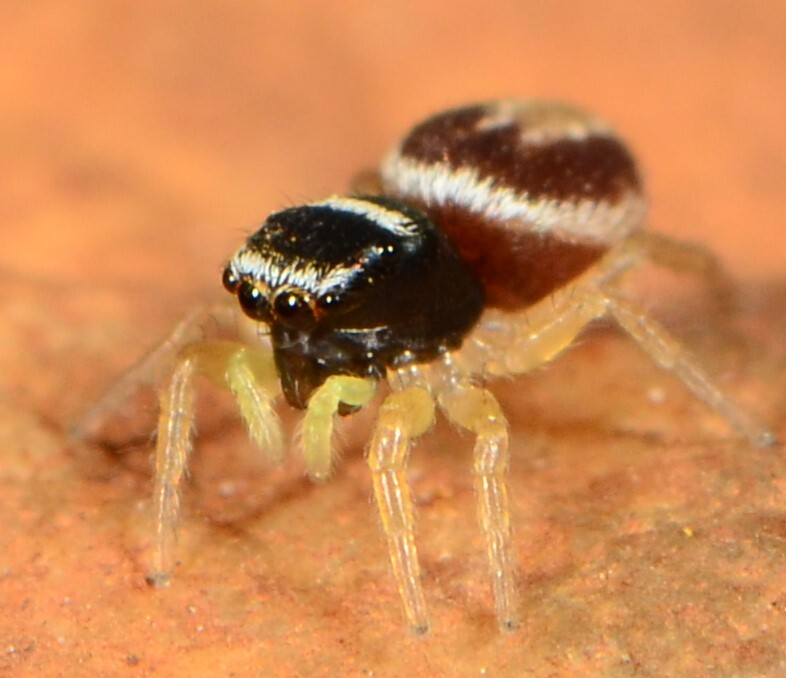
female H. insperatus

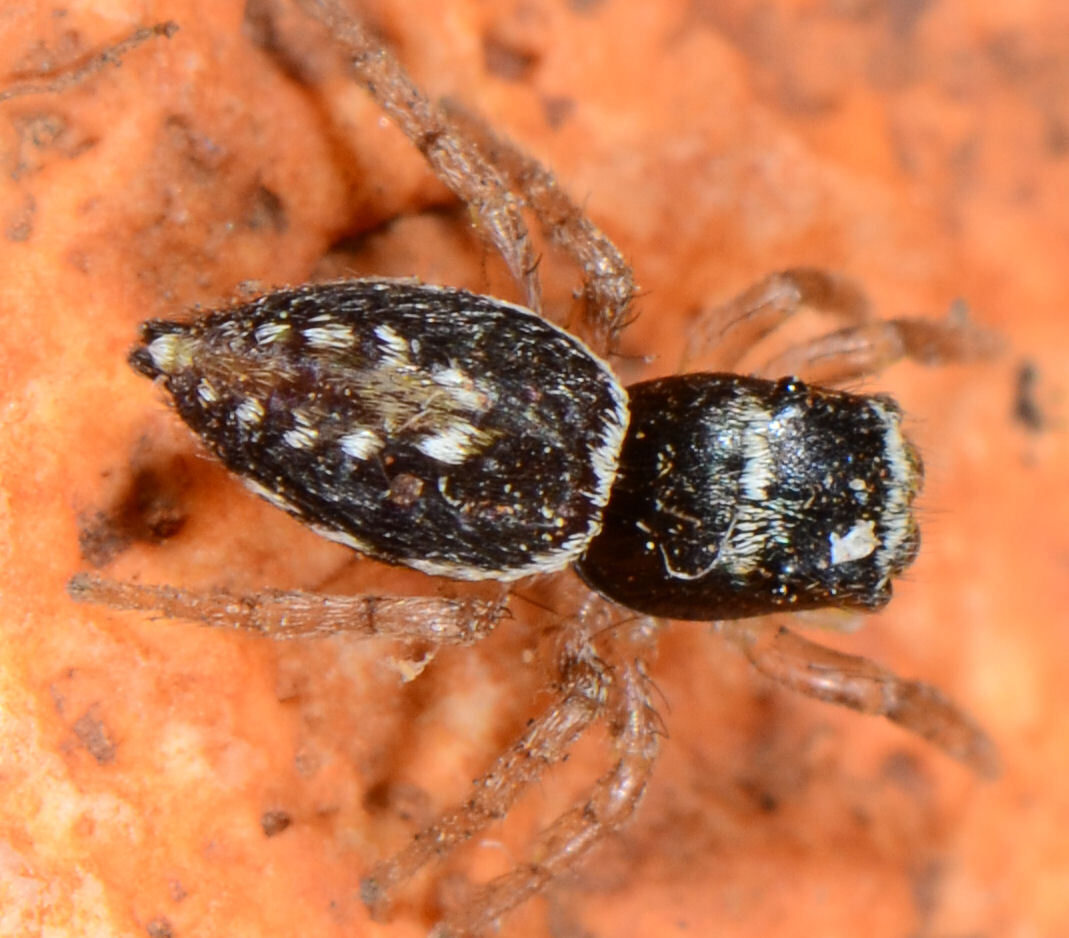
female H. nanus

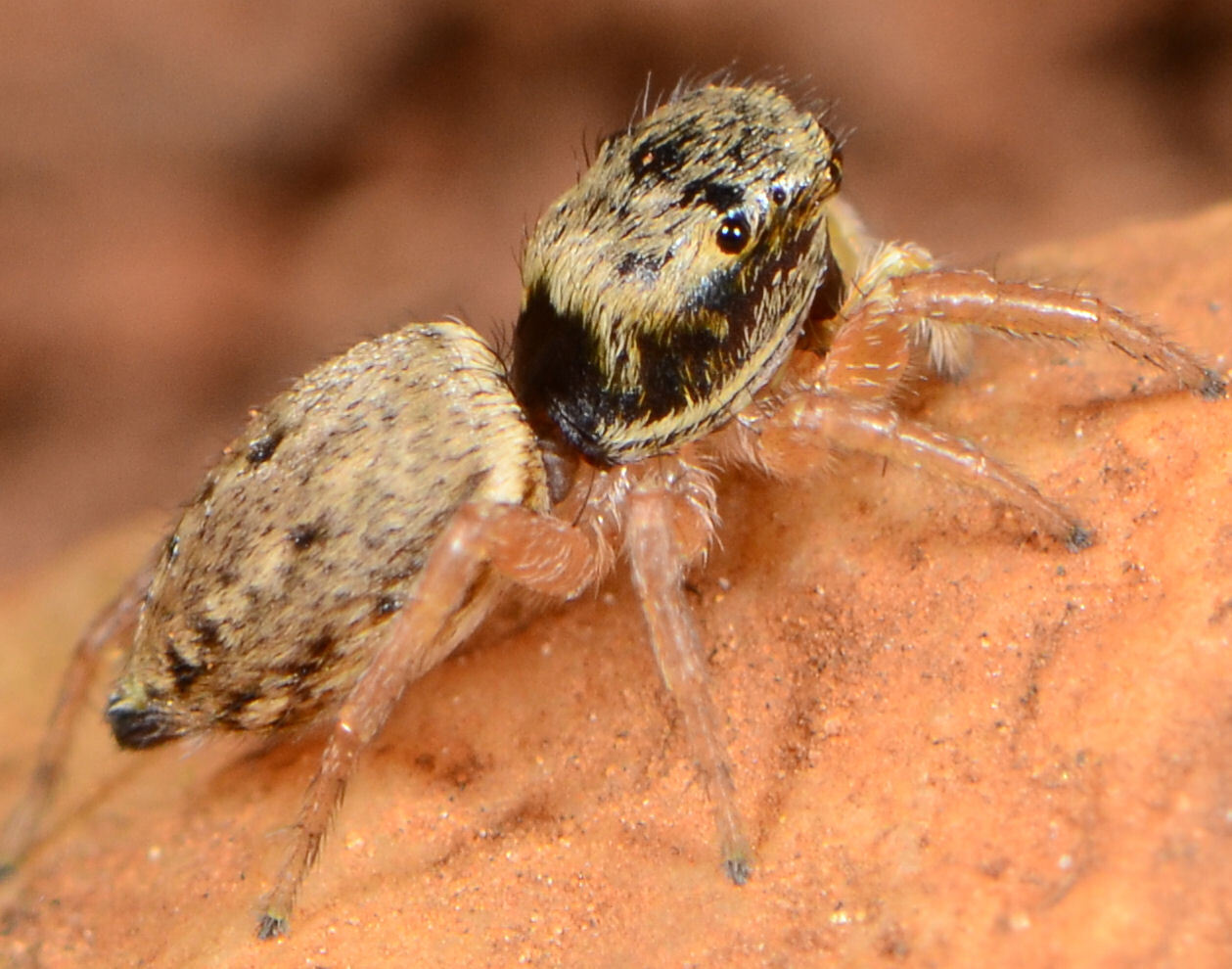
female H. trepidus

As of October 2025, this genus includes 46 species:

- Helafricanus aethiopicus (Wesołowska, 2003) – Ethiopia
- Helafricanus alienus (Wesołowska, 1986) – Cameroon
- Helafricanus anymphos (Wesołowska, 2003) – Kenya
- Helafricanus bisulcus (Wesołowska, 1986) – Namibia, South Africa
- Helafricanus bolensis (Wesołowska, 2003) – Ethiopia
- Helafricanus brevis (Wesołowska, 2003) – Ethiopia
- Helafricanus butemboensis (Wesołowska, 1986) – Ivory Coast, DR Congo, Rwanda
- Helafricanus congolensis (Giltay, 1935) – Nigeria, Congo, São Tomé and Príncipe
- Helafricanus crudeni (Lessert, 1925) – Tanzania
- Helafricanus debilis (Simon, 1901) – DR Congo, Tanzania, Angola, Malawi, Namibia, Botswana, Zimbabwe, Mozambique, South Africa, Lesotho
- Helafricanus decempunctatus (Caporiacco, 1941) – Ethiopia
- Helafricanus demonstrativus (Wesołowska, 1986) – Tanzania, Botswana, Zimbabwe, Mozambique, South Africa, Lesotho
- Helafricanus dux (Wesołowska & van Harten, 1994) – Yemen
- Helafricanus edentulus (Simon, 1871) – Nigeria, Mediterranean to Iran
- Helafricanus erythropleurus (Kulczyński, 1901) – Ethiopia
- Helafricanus fascinatus (Wesołowska, 1986) – Ghana, Sudan, DR Congo, Rwanda, Botswana, South Africa, Yemen
- Helafricanus furvus (Wesołowska & Haddad, 2014) – Lesotho
- Helafricanus giltayi (Lessert, 1933) – Kenya to Angola
- Helafricanus gloriosus (Wesołowska, 1986) – Angola, Botswana
- Helafricanus hastatus (Wesołowska, 1986) – South Africa, Lesotho
- Helafricanus heurtaultae (Rollard & Wesołowska, 2002) – Guinea
- Helafricanus imperator (Wesołowska, 1986) – Kenya, Malawi
- Helafricanus insperatus (Wesołowska, 1986) – DR Congo, Angola, Zimbabwe, South Africa
- Helafricanus jacksoni (Wesołowska, 2011) – Kenya
- Helafricanus kenyaensis (Wesołowska, 1986) – Uganda, Kenya, Tanzania
- Helafricanus kilimanjaroensis (Wesołowska, 1986) – Tanzania
- Helafricanus kovacsi (Wesołowska, 2003) – Ethiopia
- Helafricanus leucopes (Wesołowska, 2003) – Ethiopia
- Helafricanus marshalli (G. W. Peckham & E. G. Peckham, 1903) – South Africa
- Helafricanus megae (Wesołowska, 2003) – Zimbabwe
- Helafricanus minutissimus (Caporiacco, 1941) – Ethiopia
- Helafricanus modicus (G. W. Peckham & E. G. Peckham, 1903) – South Africa, Lesotho, Madagascar
- Helafricanus nanus (Wesołowska, 2003) – Namibia, South Africa
- Helafricanus papyri (Wesołowska, 2003) – Ethiopia
- Helafricanus patellaris (Simon, 1901) – South Africa, Lesotho (type species)
- Helafricanus paulus (Wesołowska, 1986) – Nigeria, Botswana
- Helafricanus pauper (Wesołowska, 1986) – Ethiopia, Kenya, Zambia, Zimbabwe, South Africa
- Helafricanus pistaciae (Wesołowska, 2003) – Zimbabwe, South Africa
- Helafricanus proszynskii (Wesołowska, 2003) – South Africa, Lesotho
- Helafricanus rutrosus (Wesołowska, 2003) – Ethiopia
- Helafricanus saudis (Prószyński, 1989) – Saudi Arabia, Yemen
- Helafricanus transversus (Wesołowska & Haddad, 2014) – Lesotho
- Helafricanus trepidus (Simon, 1910) – Angola, Namibia, Botswana, Zimbabwe, South Africa
- Helafricanus undecimmaculatus (Caporiacco, 1941) – Somalia, Uganda, Kenya, Tanzania
- Helafricanus validus (Wesołowska, 1986) – Kenya
- Helafricanus xanthopes (Wesołowska, 2003) – Ethiopia
