= Helafricanus hastatus =

Spotted Helafricanus Sunny Jumping Spider

Scientific classification
- Kingdom: Animalia
- Phylum: Arthropoda
- Subphylum: Chelicerata
- Class: Arachnida
- Order: Araneae
- Infraorder: Araneomorphae
- Family: Salticidae
- Genus: Helafricanus
- Species: H. hastatus

Binomial name
- Helafricanus hastatus (Wesołowska, 1986)

Synonyms
- Heliophanus hastatus Wesołowska, 1986

Species of spider

Helafricanus hastatus is a species of spider in the family Salticidae. It is endemic to southern Africa and is commonly known as the spotted Helafricanus sunny jumping spider.

== Distribution ==
Helafricanus hastatus is found in Lesotho and South Africa.

In South Africa, it has been recorded from seven provinces..

== Habitat and ecology ==
Helafricanus hastatus is a free-living plant-dwelling spider found on vegetation in the Grassland, Savanna, and Thicket biomes at altitudes ranging from 6 to 2,799 m. The species was also sampled in crops such as cotton, kenaf, and sorghum.

== Conservation ==
Helafricanus hastatus is listed as Least Concern by the South African National Biodiversity Institute due to its wide geographical range. In South Africa, it has been sampled from more than ten protected areas.

== Taxonomy ==
Helafricanus hastatus was originally described by Wesołowska in 1986 from Melville Koppies in Gauteng as a member of Heliophanus. The species was redescribed by Wesołowska in 2003 and transferred to Helafricanus by Wesołowska in 2024.
