= Helafricanus patellaris =

Helafricanus Sunny Jumping Spider

Scientific classification
- Kingdom: Animalia
- Phylum: Arthropoda
- Subphylum: Chelicerata
- Class: Arachnida
- Order: Araneae
- Infraorder: Araneomorphae
- Family: Salticidae
- Genus: Helafricanus
- Species: H. patellaris

Binomial name
- Helafricanus patellaris (Simon, 1901)

Synonyms
- Heliophanus patellaris Simon, 1901

Species of spider

Helafricanus patellaris - a species of spider in the family Salticidae. It is endemic to southern Africa and is commonly known as the Helafricanus sunny jumping spider. It is the type species of the genus Helafricanus.

== Distribution ==
Helafricanus patellaris is found in Lesotho and South Africa. In South Africa, it is known from seven provinces.

== Habitat and ecology ==
Helafricanus patellaris is found in a wide range of habitats, including under rocks, in leaf litter, grasses, and on the walls of buildings.

In South Africa, it has been sampled from the Nama Karoo, Fynbos, and Grassland biomes at altitudes ranging from 5 to 2,452 m. The species was also sampled from maize fields in Lesotho.

== Conservation ==
Helafricanus patellaris is listed as Least Concern by the South African National Biodiversity Institute due to its wide geographical range. It is protected in five protected areas, including Suikerbosrand Nature Reserve, De Hoop Nature Reserve, Fernkloof Nature Reserve, Table Mountain National Park, and Tussen-die-Riviere Nature Reserve.

== Taxonomy ==
Helafricanus patellaris was originally described in genus Heliophanus by Simon in 1901 with the type locality given only as Cape Colony. Additional information was added by Wesołowska in 1986 and by Wesołowska and Haddad in 2014. The species was transferred to Helafricanus and designated as the type species by Wesołowska in 2024.
