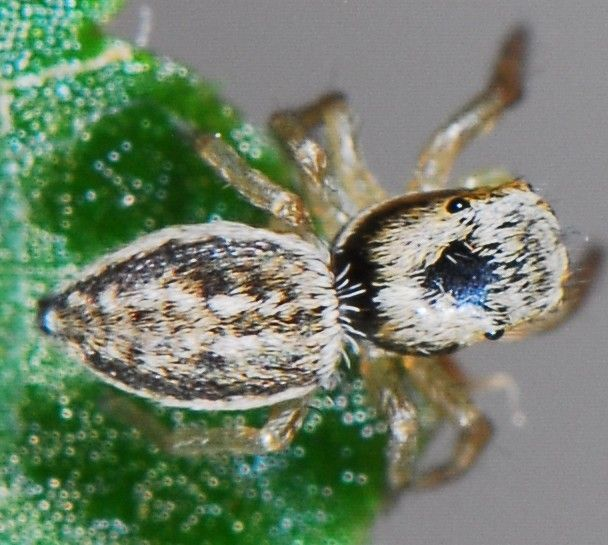
- juvenile female
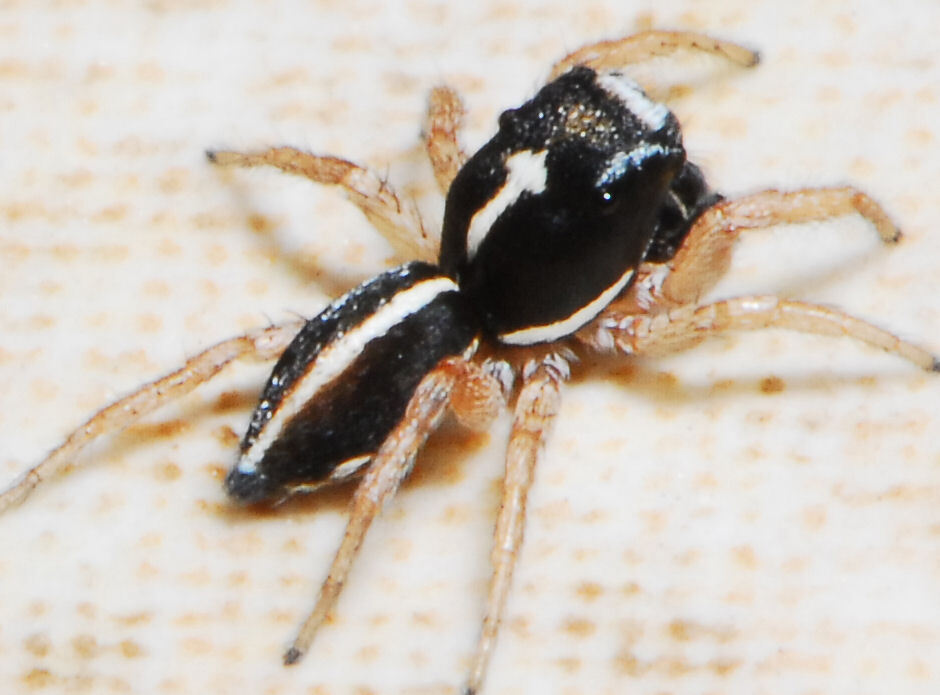
- male

Scientific classification
- Kingdom: Animalia
- Phylum: Arthropoda
- Subphylum: Chelicerata
- Class: Arachnida
- Order: Araneae
- Infraorder: Araneomorphae
- Family: Salticidae
- Genus: Helafricanus
- Species: H. pistaciae

Binomial name
- Helafricanus pistaciae (Wesołowska, 2003)

Synonyms
- Heliophanus pistaciae Wesołowska, 2003

= Helafricanus pistaciae =

Pistachio Helafricanus Sunny Jumping Spider

Species of spider

Helafricanus pistaciae is a species of spider in the family Salticidae. It is endemic to southern Africa and is commonly known as the pistachio Helafricanus sunny jumping spider.

== Distribution ==
Helafricanus pistaciae is found in South Africa and Zimbabwe.

In South Africa, the species has a wide distribution and has been sampled in seven provinces.

== Habitat and ecology ==
Helafricanus pistaciae is an agrobiont spider sampled from pistachio orchards at the type locality, Green Valley Nuts in the Prieska district of the Northern Cape. It dominated the arboreal fauna and was also common in ground covers. The species was also sampled from several other agroecosystems including cotton, kenaf, pecan orchards, potatoes, pumpkin, and sugar cane. Most of the records were collected by pitfall trapping, beating, canopy fogging, or sweep-netting, suggesting fairly adaptable habits.

The species was found from low herbaceous plants and on the ground up to tree canopies in the Grassland, Indian Ocean Coastal Belt, Nama Karoo, and Savanna biomes at altitudes ranging from 47 to 1,795 m.

== Description ==
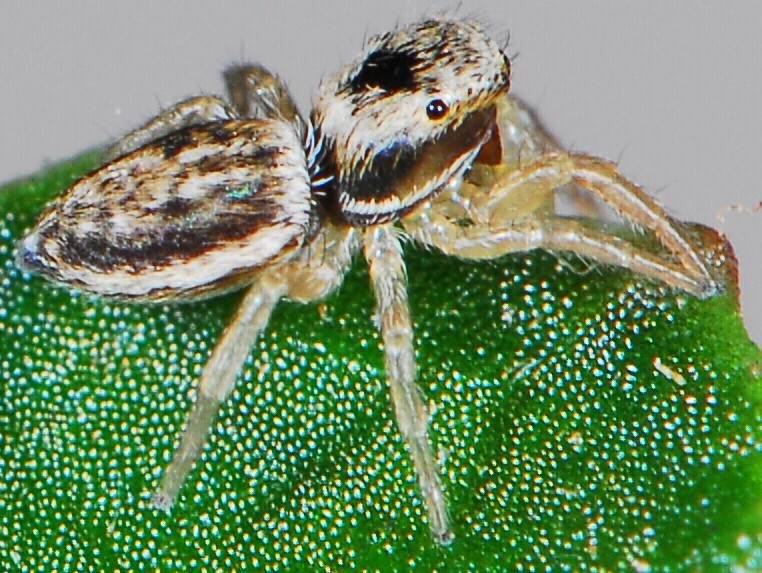
juvenile female

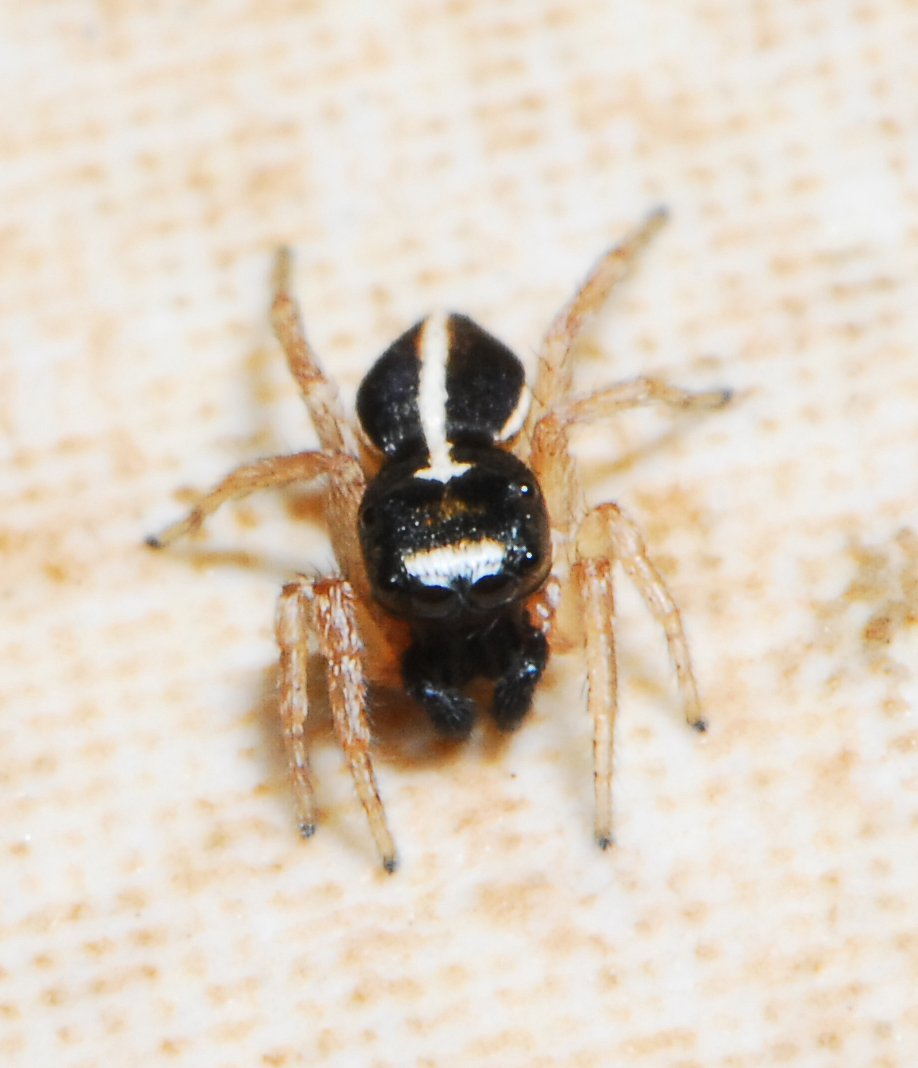
male

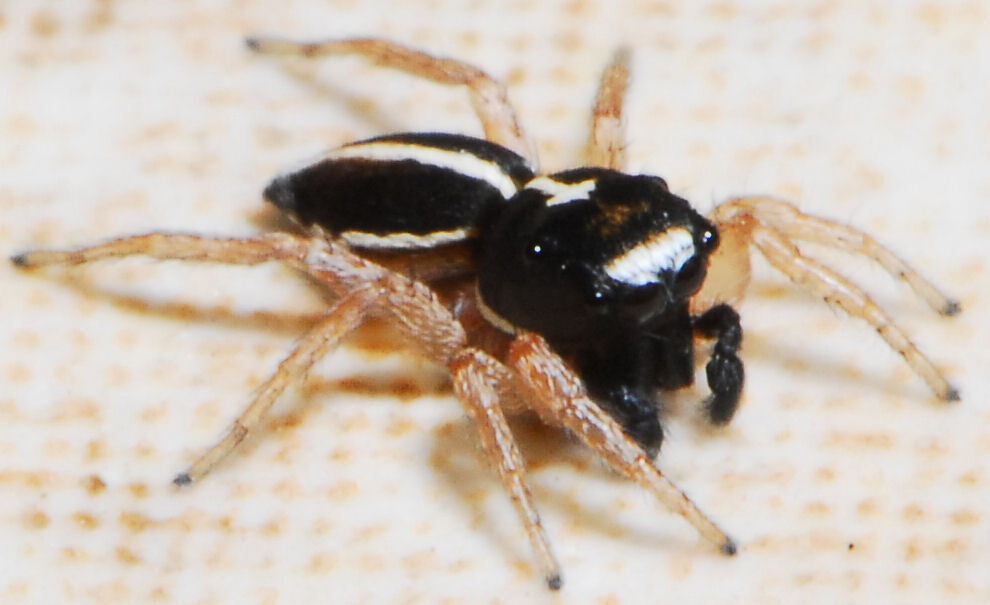
male

== Conservation ==
Helafricanus pistaciae is listed as Least Concern by the South African National Biodiversity Institute due to its wide range. In South Africa, it is protected in more than 10 protected areas.

== Taxonomy ==
Helafricanus pistaciae was originally described by Wesołowska in 2003 from Prieska in South Africa. The species was transferred to Helafricanus by Wesołowska in 2024.
