= Helafricanus imperator =

Scientific classification
- Kingdom: Animalia
- Phylum: Arthropoda
- Subphylum: Chelicerata
- Class: Arachnida
- Order: Araneae
- Infraorder: Araneomorphae
- Family: Salticidae
- Genus: Helafricanus
- Species: H. imperator

Binomial name
- Helafricanus imperator (Wesołowska, 1986)

Species of spider

Helafricanus imperator is a jumping spider species in the genus Helafricanus. It was first described by Wanda Wesołowska in 1986 as Heliophanus imperator, and transferred by her to her new genus Helafricanus in 2024. It is native to Kenya and Malawi.
