= Helafricanus fascinatus =

Fascinating Helafricanus Sunny Jumping Spider

Scientific classification
- Kingdom: Animalia
- Phylum: Arthropoda
- Subphylum: Chelicerata
- Class: Arachnida
- Order: Araneae
- Infraorder: Araneomorphae
- Family: Salticidae
- Genus: Helafricanus
- Species: H. fascinatus

Binomial name
- Helafricanus fascinatus (Wesołowska, 1986)

Synonyms
- Heliophanus fascinatus Wesołowska, 1986

Species of spider

Helafricanus fascinatus is a species of spider in the family Salticidae. It is endemic to Africa and is commonly known as the fascinating Helafricanus sunny jumping spider.

== Distribution ==
Helafricanus fascinatus is found in Botswana, Democratic Republic of the Congo, Ghana, Rwanda, South Africa, Sudan, and Yemen, and possibly introduced to Switzerland.

In South Africa, it is known from four provinces. Notable locations include Baviaanskloof, Bloemfontein at the Free State National Botanical Gardens, Kliprivierberg Nature Reserve, Roodeplaat Research Station, Mkuzi Swamp, Ndumo Game Reserve, Oribi Gorge Nature Reserve, and Shakaskraal.

== Habitat and ecology ==
Helafricanus fascinatus is a free-living plant-dwelling spider sampled from grasses and low herbs in the Grassland and Savanna biomes at altitudes ranging from 47 to 1,730 m. The species makes silk retreats in leaf litter and low foliage. In Ndumo Game Reserve, it was sampled from the bark of the fever tree. The species has also been sampled from potato fields.

== Conservation ==
Helafricanus fascinatus is listed as Least Concern by the South African National Biodiversity Institute due to its wide geographical range. It is protected in Baviaanskloof, Free State National Botanical Gardens, and Ndumo Game Reserve.

== Taxonomy ==
Helafricanus fascinatus was originally described in the genus Heliophanus by Wesołowska in 1986 from the Democratic Republic of the Congo. The species was redescribed by Wesołowska and Haddad in 2009 and transferred to Helafricanus by Wesołowska in 2024.
