= Helafricanus proszynskii =

Proszynski's Helafricanus Sunny Jumping Spider

Scientific classification
- Kingdom: Animalia
- Phylum: Arthropoda
- Subphylum: Chelicerata
- Class: Arachnida
- Order: Araneae
- Infraorder: Araneomorphae
- Family: Salticidae
- Genus: Helafricanus
- Species: H. proszynskii

Binomial name
- Helafricanus proszynskii (Wesołowska, 2003)

Synonyms
- Heliophanus proszynskii Wesołowska, 2003

Species of spider

Helafricanus proszynskii is a species of spider in the family Salticidae. It is endemic to southern Africa and is commonly known as Proszynski's Helafricanus sunny jumping spider.

== Distribution ==
Helafricanus proszynskii is found in Lesotho and South Africa.

In South Africa, it is known from eight provinces..

== Habitat and ecology ==
Helafricanus proszynskii is a free-living plant-dwelling spider sampled from the Fynbos, Grassland, Indian Ocean Coastal Belt, and Savanna biomes at altitudes ranging from 7 to 2,398 m. The species was also sampled from cotton, tomato, and wheat fields.

== Conservation ==
Helafricanus proszynskii is listed as Least Concern by the South African National Biodiversity Institute due to its wide geographical range. In South Africa, it is conserved in nine protected areas.

== Etymology ==
The species is named in honor of arachnologist Jerzy Prószyński, who has made significant contributions to the taxonomy of jumping spiders.

== Taxonomy ==
Helafricanus proszynskii was originally described by Wesołowska in 2003 from Bredasdorp in the Western Cape. Additional data was added by Wesołowska and Haddad in 2009. The species was transferred to Helafricanus by Wesołowska in 2024.
