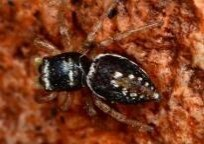
- female

Scientific classification
- Kingdom: Animalia
- Phylum: Arthropoda
- Subphylum: Chelicerata
- Class: Arachnida
- Order: Araneae
- Infraorder: Araneomorphae
- Family: Salticidae
- Genus: Helafricanus
- Species: H. modicus

Binomial name
- Helafricanus modicus (G. W. Peckham & E. G. Peckham, 1903)

Synonyms
- Heliophanus modicus Peckham & Peckham, 1903

= Helafricanus modicus =

Eastern Cape Helafricanus Sunny Jumping Spider

Species of spider

Helafricanus modicus is a species of spider in the family Salticidae. It is endemic to Africa and is commonly known as the Eastern Cape Helafricanus sunny jumping spider.

== Distribution ==
Helafricanus modicus is found in Lesotho, Madagascar, and South Africa.

In South Africa, it has been sampled from three provinces.

== Habitat and ecology ==
Helafricanus modicus is a free-living plant-dwelling spider sampled from the Fynbos, Grassland, and Thicket biomes at altitudes ranging from 7 to 2,398 m. The species was also sampled from crops such as lucerne and in vineyards.

== Conservation ==
Helafricanus modicus is listed as Least Concern by the South African National Biodiversity Institute due to its wide geographical range. In South Africa, it has been sampled from several protected areas.

== Taxonomy ==
Helafricanus modicus was originally described by G. W. Peckham and E. G. Peckham in 1903 from Willowmore in the Eastern Cape. The species was revised by Wesołowska in 1986 and transferred to Helafricanus by Wesołowska in 2024.
