= Helafricanus pauper =

Pauper Helafricanus Sunny Jumping Spider

Scientific classification
- Kingdom: Animalia
- Phylum: Arthropoda
- Subphylum: Chelicerata
- Class: Arachnida
- Order: Araneae
- Infraorder: Araneomorphae
- Family: Salticidae
- Genus: Helafricanus
- Species: H. pauper

Binomial name
- Helafricanus pauper (Wesołowska, 1986)

Synonyms
- Heliophanus pauper Wesołowska, 1986

Species of spider

Helafricanus pauper is a species of spider in the family Salticidae. It is endemic to Africa and is commonly known as the pauper Helafricanus sunny jumping spider.

== Distribution ==
Helafricanus pauper is found in Ethiopia, Kenya, South Africa, Zambia, and Zimbabwe.

In South Africa, it is known from four provinces. Notable locations include Grahamstown, Dlinza Forest near Eshowe, Howick, Ithala Game Reserve, Ndumo Game Reserve, Lydenburg, and Kgaswane Mountain Reserve.

== Habitat and ecology ==
Helafricanus pauper is a free-living plant-dwelling spider sampled from the Savanna and Thicket biomes at altitudes ranging from 47 to 1,556 m.

== Conservation ==
Helafricanus pauper is listed as Least Concern by the South African National Biodiversity Institute due to its wide range in the eastern half of South Africa, although sporadic. In South Africa, it is protected in two reserves, Ndumo Game Reserve and Kgaswane Mountain Reserve.

== Taxonomy ==
Helafricanus pauper was originally described in genus Heliophanus by Wesołowska in 1986 from Kenya. Additional data on the male was added by Wesołowska in 1999 and 2003. The species was transferred to Helafricanus by Wesołowska in 2024.
