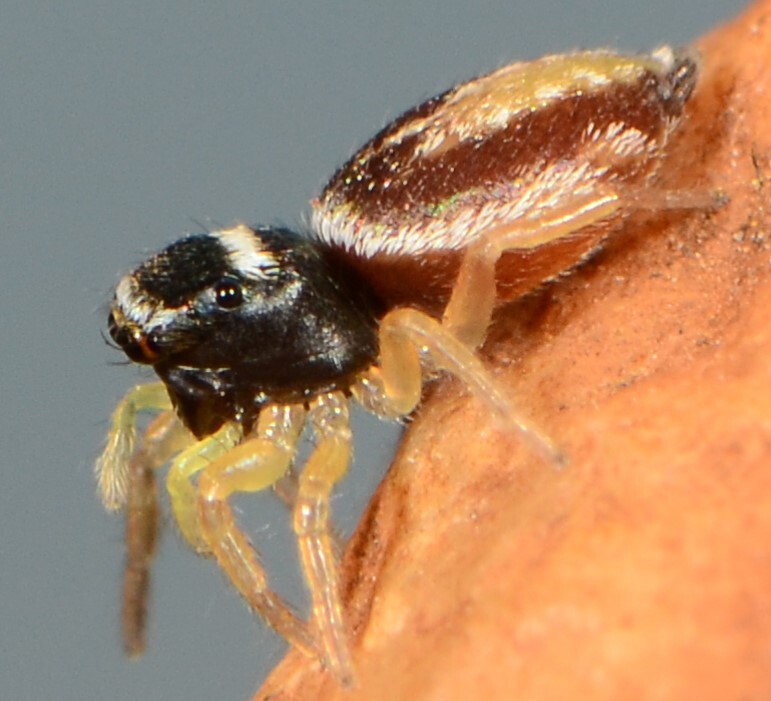
- female
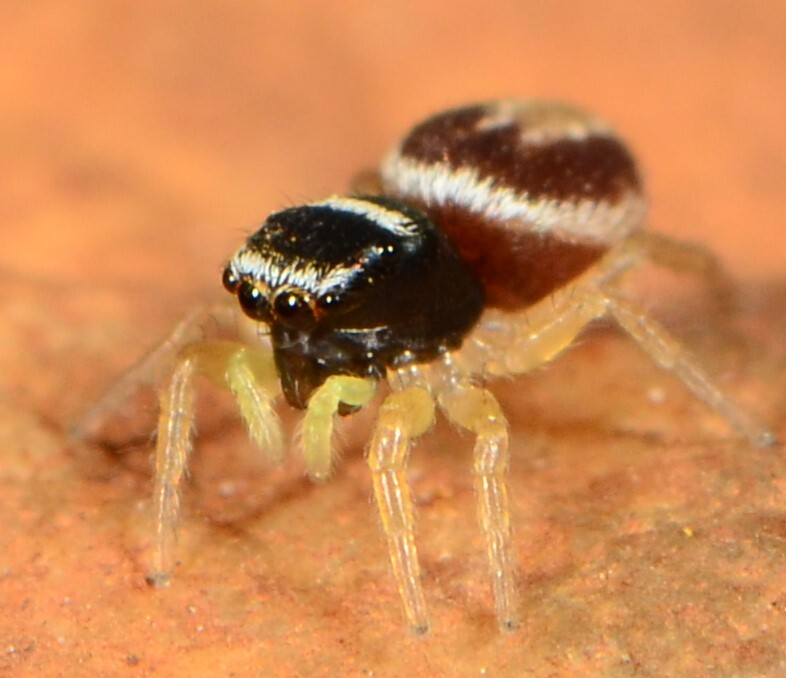
- female

Scientific classification
- Kingdom: Animalia
- Phylum: Arthropoda
- Subphylum: Chelicerata
- Class: Arachnida
- Order: Araneae
- Infraorder: Araneomorphae
- Family: Salticidae
- Genus: Helafricanus
- Species: H. insperatus

Binomial name
- Helafricanus insperatus (Wesołowska, 1986)

Synonyms
- Heliophanus insperatus Wesołowska, 1986

= Helafricanus insperatus =

Species of spider

Helafricanus insperatus is a species of spider in the family Salticidae. It is endemic to Africa.

== Distribution ==
Helafricanus insperatus is found in Angola, Democratic Republic of the Congo, South Africa, and Zimbabwe.

In South Africa, it has been recorded from four provinces..

== Habitat and ecology ==
Helafricanus insperatus has been sampled by beating and sweeping vegetation in the Fynbos, Grassland, and Savanna biomes at altitudes ranging from 290 to 1,414 m. The species was also sampled from citrus, cotton, and kenaf.

== Conservation ==
Helafricanus insperatus is listed as Least Concern by the South African National Biodiversity Institute due to its wide geographical range. In South Africa, it has been recorded from nine protected areas.

== Taxonomy ==
Helafricanus insperatus was originally described by Wesołowska in 1986 from Magaliesberg, Gauteng. Additional data was added by Wesołowska in 2003, and the species was transferred to Helafricanus by Wesołowska in 2024.
