= Ronald A. Ochoa =

American acarologist

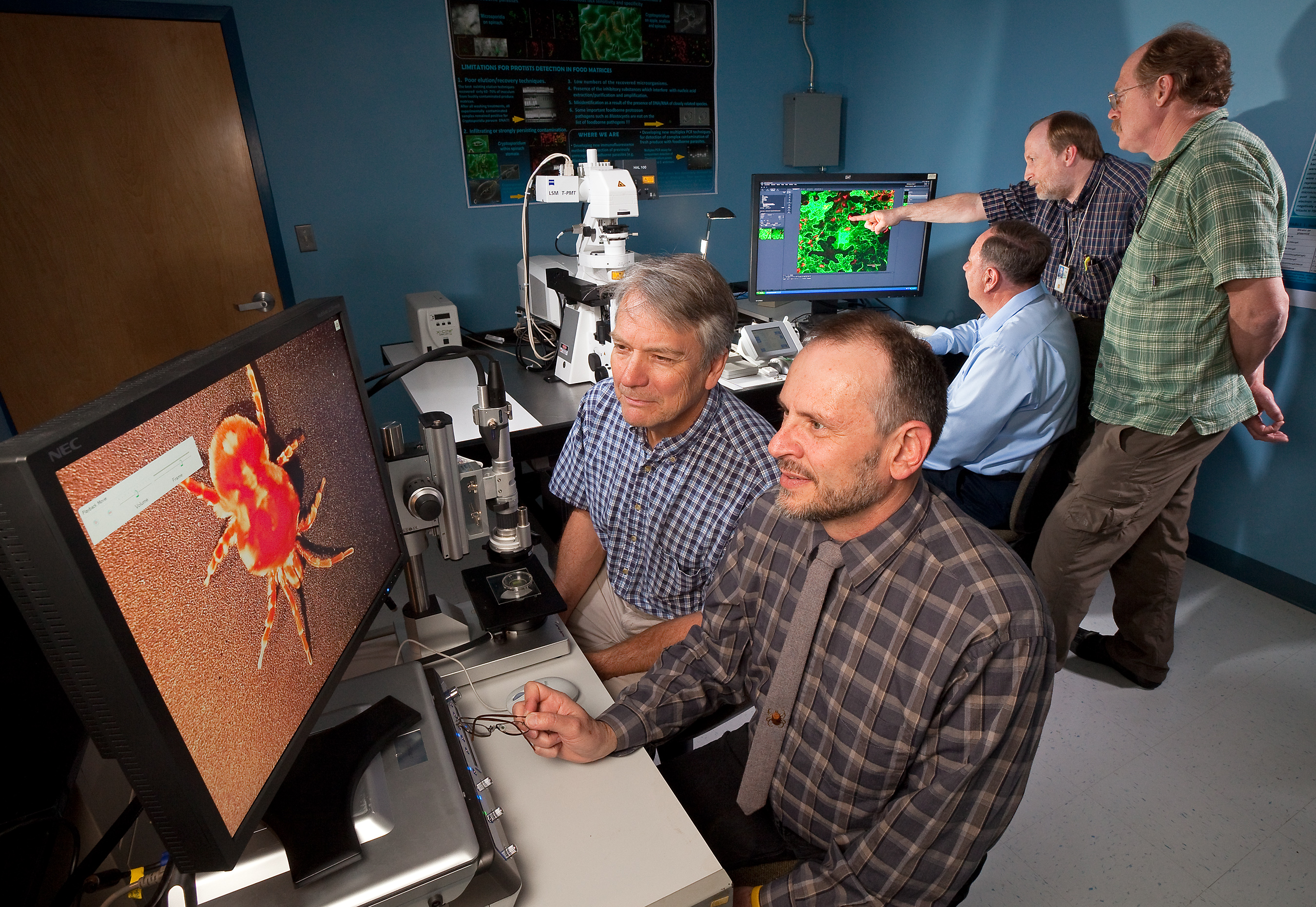
- Ochoa (far left) in 2013
- Born: Ronald Ochoa Perez; 1959 (age 66–67); San José, Costa Rica
- Other name: Ron Ochoa
- Citizenship: United States of America
- Education: University of Michigan, Brigham Young University, CATIE, Universidad de Costa Rica
- Known for: Acarology, Entomology, Microscopy
- Children: 2
- Scientific career
- Workplaces: USDA, CATIE, Smithsonian

Ronald Ochoa Perez (born in 1959), professionally known as Ron Ochoa, is an American acarologist and research entomologist at the U.S. Department of Agriculture’s Agricultural Research Service (ARS/EES), based at the Systematic Entomology Laboratory in Beltsville, Maryland. Known for his expertise in mite taxonomy, systematics, and microscopy, Ochoa has significantly advanced the study of mites and their impact on agriculture and ecosystems.

== Early life ==
Ochoa was born in San José, Costa Rica, to Rolando Ochoa and Virginia Perez. From an early age, he developed a strong interest in the natural world, particularly biology and entomology. By the age of eight, he was actively collecting insects and lizards. At 12 he resolved to pursue a career in entomology, and by 24, he had developed a specific interest in the study of mites. Ochoa’s first hands-on experience in entomology came through the Museo de Insectos in San José, Costa Rica.

== Education ==
Ochoa completed his primary and secondary schooling at the Colegio Calasanz in San Jose, Costa Rica. His academic background includes a BSc in Plant Protection (1977–1983) and a BSc in Agronomic Engineering (1983–1985), both from the University of Costa Rica, and an MSc from the Centro Agronómico Tropical de Investigación y Enseñanza (CATIE) in Costa Rica (1987–1989).

He earned his PhD in Zoology, specializing in Acarology and Entomology, from Brigham Young University in Provo, Utah (1991–1996). He conducted his post-doctoral research at the University of Michigan (1996–1997) and focused on Acarology, particularly the taxonomy and biology of Astigmata and Tarsonemidae, including bee-associated mites. He joined the USDA's Systematic Entomology Laboratory in Beltsville, Maryland in 1998 and continues to work there until the present day.

Ochoa was guided by several influential mentors throughout his career. In Costa Rica, he was influenced by botanists Rafael Lucas Rodríguez, Ludwig E. Müller, and entomologists Álvaro Wille Trejos, William Ramírez, Luis Ángel Salas Fonseca and Joseph L. Saunders. In the United States, he studied with experts such as Evert E. Lindquist, Richard Baumann, Marek J. Kaliszewski, Edward W. Baker, and Robert L. Smiley. During his postdoctoral work at the University of Michigan, he worked with Barry OConnor. He also attended Acarology Summer Programs at the Ohio State University, learning from W. Calvin Welbourn, and John B. Kethley.

== Career ==
Ochoa began his academic career as a teaching assistant in entomology at the University of Costa Rica (1979–1983). From the late 1980s to early 1990s, he served as an instructor and invited professor in acarology and plant diagnostic methods at the University of Costa Rica and CATIE, and taught specialized courses about plant feeding mites in Central America.

Ochoa served as a teaching assistant in biology, zoology, and entomology courses at Brigham Young University (1991-1996) and the University of Michigan (1996–1997). From 2000 onward, he taught workshops in agricultural acarology and mite taxonomy for universities, governmental institutions, and quarantine officers in the United States, Brazil, Australia, Argentina, Panama, Saint Lucia, Trinidad & Tobago, South Africa, Guatemala, and Peru. Ochoa was a regularly invited instructor at the Ohio State University’s Acarology Summer Program (2007–2018) and has continued to do so after the program moved to the University of Arkansas. He also has supported a similar program at the University of Florida.

Ochoa, together with Gary R. Bauchan, William Wergin, and Eric Erbe, has been instrumental in adapting low-temperature scanning electron microscopy (LT-SEM) for acarological studies. This technique allows for high-resolution and construction of three-dimensional imaging of mites in their natural habitats, providing insights into their morphology and behavior. His work has revealed complex details of mite morphology, such as mouthparts and sensory organs, enhancing our understanding of their interactions with host plants and animals. As an adjunct scientist at the Smithsonian’s National Museum of Natural History, Ochoa oversees a collection of over one million mite specimens, representing thousands of species. This collection serves as a key resource for taxonomic research and biodiversity studies.

Throughout his career, he has authored or coauthored over 350 scientific articles, four books, six book chapters, and two catalogs. He has also played a key role in developing online identification tools for agriculturally important mites, such as the "Bee Mite ID" and "Flat Mites of the World" projects. Ochoa's research has practical applications in agriculture, particularly in understanding and managing mite associated plant diseases. For example, his studies on the links between Brevipalpus phoenicis complex and citrus leprosis virus have provided critical insights into the disease's spread and impact on citrus crops.

Some of his higher research impact topics include:

- Systematics of the family Tenuipalpide (Brevipalpus and Raoiella) and the family Tarsonemidae
- Mites for biocontrol, mite plant interactions and ecological associations
- Development and implementation of identification tools for agriculture mite pests
- Curation and digitization of the U.S. National Mite Collection at the Smithsonian Institution
- Remote sensing tracking damage by Raoiella mites

He has described over 130 new mite species and several new genera across the super orders Acariformes and Parasitiformes. His work covers tropical mite diversity and systematics from North, Central and South America, and includes the description of novel taxa from agricultural, forest, and parasitic ecosystems. His research has focused on economically and ecologically important mites and has involved collaborations with researchers worldwide.

Taxonomic groups described:

- Mesostigmata:
  - Asca nelsoni (Ascidae)
- Astigmata (Acaridae):
  - 8 species, including Rhizoglyphus costarricensis and seven species in the genus Horstiella.
- Heterostigmata:
  - Acarophenacidae: 7 species in Adactylidium and Paradactylidium.
  - Podapolipidae: 3 species, including the genus Buprestapolipus.
  - Tarsonemidae: Over 60 species and 7 genera described, including Alkithoenemus, Crossacarapis, Excelsotarsonemus, and Paratarsonemella.
- Prostigmata:
  - Cheyletidae: 3 species, including Oconnoricheylus chimaera.
  - Tenuipalpidae: 38 species and 3 genera, notably within Brevipalpus, Raoiella, and Tenuipalpus.
  - Tetranychidae: 5 species, including Tetranychus algarrobus.
  - Trombiculidae: 6 species and new genera such as Bramkeria and Batmanacarus.

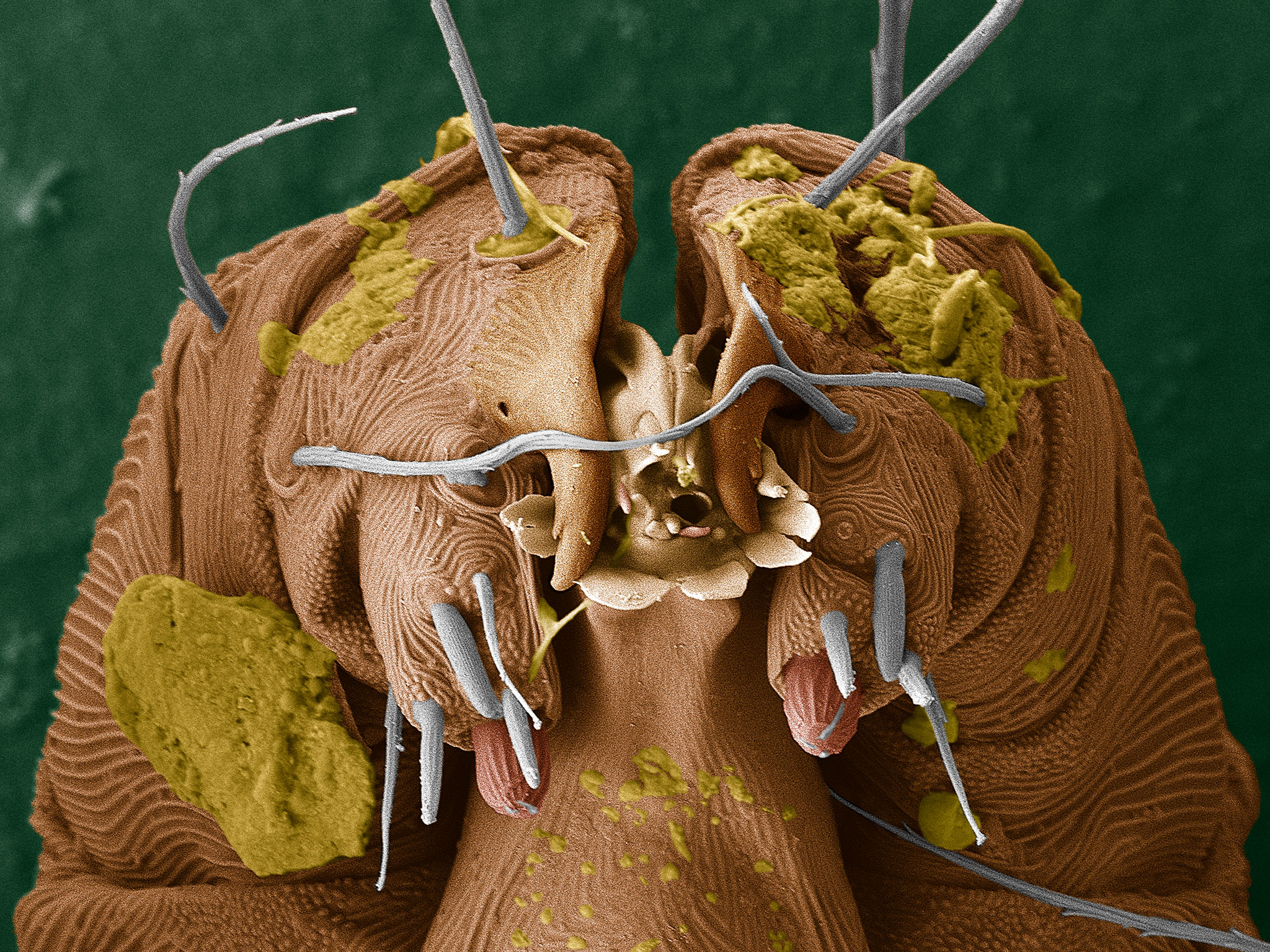
Specimen collected and mounted by Javier Huanca and Ronald Ochoa, imaged and colored by Gary Bauchan and Chris Pooley, USDA. The Gnathosoma of Mononychellus sp. resembles a "pokemon" illustration.

=== Teaching and training ===
He began his academic career as a teaching assistant in entomology at the University of Costa Rica (1979–1983). From the late 1980s to early 1990s, he served as an instructor and invited professor in acarology and plant diagnostic methods at the University of Costa Rica and CATIE, and taught specialized courses about plant feeding mites in Central America.

Ochoa served as a teaching assistant in biology, zoology, and entomology courses at Brigham Young University (1991-1996) and the University of Michigan (1996–1997). From 2000 onward, he taught workshops in agricultural acarology and mite taxonomy for universities, governmental institutions, and quarantine officers in the United States, Brazil, Australia, Argentina, Panama, Saint Lucia, Trinidad & Tobago, South Africa, Guatemala, and Peru. Ochoa was a regularly invited instructor at the Ohio State University’s Acarology Summer Program (2007–2018) and has continued to do so after the program moved to the University of Arkansas. He also has supported as similar program at the University of Florida.

Ochoa has also mentored high school research students in Maryland and actively participated in virtual acarology seminars during the COVID-19 pandemic through the Acarological Society of Latin America (Sociedad Latinoamericana de Acarologia) reaching hundreds of participants globally. His most recent teaching roles include workshops in Brazil, Argentina, Peru, and the U.S. (2023–2024), reflecting his continued commitment to acarological education in agriculture worldwide.

== Awards and honors ==
Ochoa was president of the Acarological Society of America during 2006–2007 and 2014–2015, and is an honorary member to the Latin-American Acarology Society.

Several species and one genus have been named in Ochoa's honor, reflecting his contributions to acarology and entomology.

Acari (Mites):

- Tropicoseius ochoai (Ascidae) – Naskrecki & Colwell, 1998
- Sancassania ochoai (Acaridae) – Klimov, Lekveishvili & O’Connor, 2004
- Cheletomimus ochoai (Cheyletidae) – Fain, Bochkov & Corpuz-Raros, 2002
- Eutarsopolipus ochoai (Podapolipidae) – Husband, 1995
- Picobia ochoi (Syringophilidae) – Glowska & Milensky, 2014
- Brevipalpus ochoai (Tenuipalpidae) – Evans, 1993
- Oligonychus ochoai (Tetranychidae) – Meyer & Vargas, 1999
- Kaliszewskia ochoai (Tarsonemidae) – Lofego, Peterson & Moraes, 2015
- Neoschoengastia ochoai (Trombiculidae) – Jacinavicius & Bassini-Silva, 2021

In addition, the genus Ochoanemus (Tarsonemidae) was established in his honor by Lofego, Pitton & Rezende in 2016, with Ochoanemus dux designated as the type species.

Insecta:

- Amahuaka ochoai (Cicadellidae, Hemiptera) – Nielson & Godoy, 1995
- Scolothrips ochoa (Thripidae, Thysanoptera) – Mound, Tree & Goldarazena, 2010
