= Citrus leprosis disease =

Viral disease of citrus plants

Citrus leprosis (CL) is an economically important viral disease affecting citrus crops. This emerging disease is widely distributed in South and Central America, from Argentina to Mexico. The disease is associated with up to three different non-systemic viruses, which cause similar symptoms in the citrus hosts and are transmitted by the same vector, mites of the genus Brevipalpus; although they have vastly different genomes. Citrus leprosis virus nuclear type (CiLV-N) is found in the nuclei and cytoplasm of infected cells, while Citrus leprosis virus cytoplasmic type (CiLV-C) is found in the endoplasmic reticulum. In 2012, a new virus causing similar symptoms was found in Colombia and it was named Citrus leprosis virus cytoplasmic type 2 (CiLV-C2) due to its close similarity to CiLV-C. The cytoplasmic type viruses are the most prevalent and widely distributed of the three species.

== Structure and genome ==
CiLV-N has short, rod-shaped particles, 120 to 130 nanometers (nm) long and 35 to 40 nm wide, occurring in the nucleus or cytoplasm of the infected cells, and associated with the presence of viroplasm in the nucleus. The CiLV-N genome is a bipartite, negative-sense, single stranded RNA ((-)ssRNA). Both RNAs have 3'-terminal poly(A) tails. CiLV-N RNA1 (6,268 nucleotides (nt)) contains five open reading frames (ORF) encoding the nucleocapsid protein (N), putative phosphoprotein (P), cell-to-cell movement protein (MP), matrix protein (M), and glycoprotein (G). CiLV-N RNA2 (5,847 nt) contains one ORF encoding the RNA-dependent RNA polymerase (RdRp) replication module. The size and structure of the CiLV-N genome closely resembles the genome organization of Orchid fleck virus (OFV) and is likely to be a member of the newly proposed genus Dichorhavirus.

CiLV-C has short, membrane-bound bacilliform particles, 120 to 130 nm long and 50 to 55 wide; it is found in the endoplasmic reticulum in the cytoplasm of infected cells, and large electron dense viroplasm is observed in the cytoplasm. CiLV-C has a bipartite, positive-sense, single stranded, RNA ((+)ssRNA) genome. Both RNAs had 3'-terminal poly(A) tails. CiLV-C RNA1 (8,729 to 8,730 nt) contains two ORFs, encoding a 286 kilodaltons (kDa) polyprotein, putatively involved in virus replication, with four conserved domains: methyltransferase, protease, helicase, and RNA-dependent RNA polymerase (RdRp); and a 29 kDa protein, of unknown function. CiLV-C RNA2 (4,969 to 4,975 nt) contains four ORFs, encoding 15, 61, 32, and 24 kDa proteins. The 32-kDa protein is apparently involved in cell-to-cell movement of the virus (MP), but none of the other proteins showed any conserved protein domain.

CiLV-C2 is associated with short bacilliform virions, 100 to 110 nm long and 40 to 50 nm wide The genome of CiLV-C2 is composed of RNA1 (8,717) and RNA2 (4,989 nt). Both RNAs also had 3'-terminal poly(A) tails. The structure of the CiLV-C2 genome closely resembles the genome organization of CiLV-C. CiLV-C2 RNA1 have two ORFs encoding a large polyprotein (285 kDa), putative involve in virus replication, with five conserved domains (two methyltransferase, protease, helicase and RdRp); and a putative coat protein (CP) of 29 kDa. CiLV-C2 RNA2 contains five ORFs that potentially encoded five proteins: 15, 7, 61, 32, and 24 kDa, similar to those predicted protein masses for CiLV-C. The 32 kDa protein has a conserved cell-to-cell movement protein domain, and the small hypothetical protein (7 kDa), that is not present in CiLV-C, has a putative trans-membrane domain.

== Taxonomic position ==
CiLV-N probably belongs to the proposed genus Dichorhavirus, related to the family Rhabdoviridae, which has Orchid fleck virus (OFV) as the type member. CiLV-C is the type member of the new accepted genus Cilevirus. CiLV-C2 has been proposed as a new member of the genus Cilevirus.

== Transmission ==
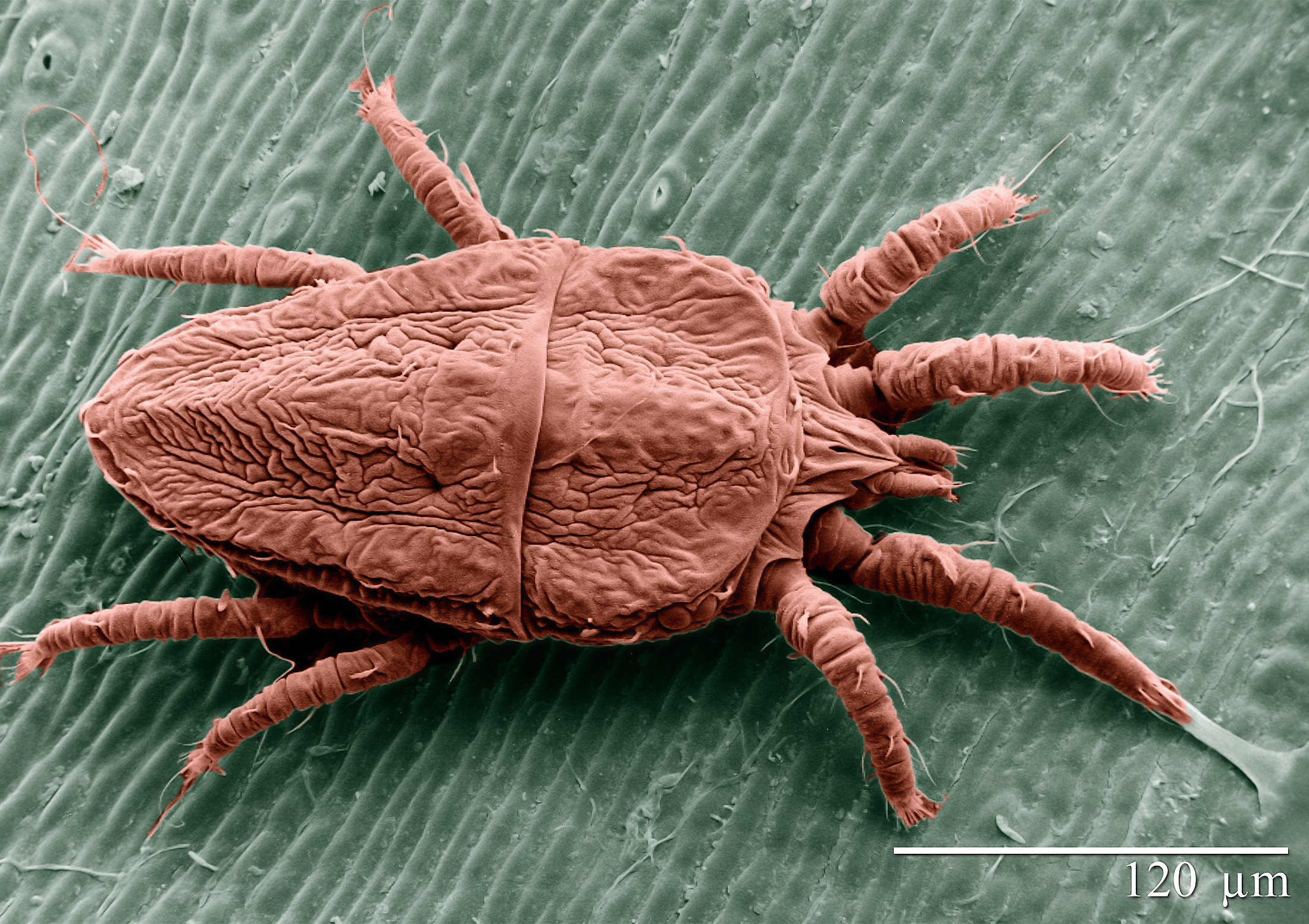
The Brevipalpus phoenicis carries the Leprosis Citrus leprosis disease, a disease currently in South America but moving North

CiLV-N, CiLV-C, and CiLV-C2 are transmitted by false spider mites or flat mites, belonging to the genus Brevipalpus (Acari: Tenuipalpidae). Three mites species within this genus have been reported as CiLV vectors: B. californicus Banks, B. obovatus Donnadieu, and B. phoenicis Geijskes, the latter is considered the main vector. The three mites species have a broad host range and are widely distributed. All active stages of the mite (larvae, nymph, and adult) can acquire and transmit the virus, although it has been reported that larvae transmit the virus more efficiently. It is known that there is no transovarial transmission from female to its descendants, and that after acquisition (an acquisition access period of 2 days), the mite remains viruliferous during entire life-span (persistent transmission), but it is not clear if the virus replicates inside the vector.

== Agricultural importance ==
CiLV produces localized symptoms in leaves, stems, and fruits. In leaves, characteristic lesions are often circular (from 5 to 12 millimetres (3/16 to 15/32 in) in diameter), chlorotic or necrotic, colored light yellow to dark brown. In older lesions, a darker central point can also be observed. In young stems, lesions are small, chlorotic and shallow; with time they become darker brown or reddish and prominent. In old stems lesions can join together and appearing larger. In fruits, dark and depressed lesions are found in large numbers and affecting only the external part. Commercial losses result from undesirable appearance and fruits falling. Some differences in symptoms produced by CiLV-C and CiLV-N have been reported; in leaves and fruits, lesions caused by the nuclear type are smaller and more numerous than those caused by the cytoplasmic type. Lesions caused by CiLV-C shows additional halos, making them look larger. This disease is considered an important problem in citriculture in countries where it has been established, and is considered the major viral disease in citrus in Brazil. Damage by leprosis in plants and in orange production has caused an annual cost of approximately US$90 million for miticides to control the disease, this represents about 40% of fertilizer and pesticide expenses and about 16% of the total costs of a grove. Because of its widespread occurrence and potential for high damage, the disease can cause 100% yield losses, depending on the susceptibility of the citrus variety, isolate and control of the vector. Because CL is considered a quarantine disease, international marketing is restricted to those regions where the disease is not reported.

CiLV-C was long considered restricted to the genus Citrus, where species exhibit different grades of susceptibility, with sweet oranges (Citrus sinensis (L.) Osbeck) being highly susceptible, mandarins (C. reticulata Blanco) and grapefruits (C. paradisi Macfad.) moderately susceptible, and lemons (C. limon (L.) Osbeck) practically immune. Nevertheless, CiLV-C was also found naturally infecting non-Citrus species as Swinglea glutinosa Merr., used as hedgerows around citrus orchards in Villavicencio, Colombia, and Commelina benghalensis L., a weed present in citrus orchards in Brazil. Mechanical transmission experiments have shown that CiLV-C could be transmitted to other species, causing localized lesions, and it also can be mite transmitted to a quite wide range of experimental plant species. B. phoenicis transmission to the common bean was also demonstrated and this species has been proposed as an experimental indicator.

== Diagnosis ==
Citrus leprosis is principally detected by the observation of local lesions with characteristic symptoms. Presence of CiLV-N and CiLV-C particles in affected tissue can be confirmed by transmission electron microscopy (TEM). Other laboratory detection methods are also available, as double antibody sandwich-enzyme-linked-immunosorbent-assay (DAS-ELISA), indirect ELISA, dot-blot immunoassay, and immunocapture-reverse transcription-polymerase chain reaction using monoclonal and polyclonal; and reverse transcription-polymerase chain reaction (RT-PCR).

== Epidemiology ==
CL was initially described in what is now Philippe Park, Florida in 1907 by Fawett who called it "scaly bark" and "nail-head rust". However, the disease appears to have disappeared from Florida since the 1960s, perhaps due to reduction of vector population caused by freezing weather and intensive sulfur application. There is evidence that CL was caused by the nuclear type. The first report of CL in South America was in 1920 in Paraguay, later it was reported in Brazil, Argentina and Uruguay. CiLV-C has been detected in Bolivia, Venezuela, and Colombia, and it is spreading northward through Panama, Costa Rica, Nicaragua, Guatemala, Honduras, El Salvador, and Mexico. CiLV-N has also been reported from the states of São Paulo, Rio Grande do Sul, and Minas Gerais in Brazil, Boquete in Panama, and in the state of Querétaro, Mexico. Recently, a mixed infection of the same plant with the two viruses CiLV-N and CiLV-C2, was reported in Casanare, Colombia. The recent establishment of citrus leprosis in Central America represents a potential threat to citriculture in North America, where the vector is also present.

== Management ==
CL is mainly controlled through the management of mites. Most of the currently available miticides are effective, although mite resistance has already been detected. Biological alternatives as mite predators and entomopathogenic fungi have been reported with promising results. Virus inoculum can be reduced implementing some cultural practices as remove affected branches, use of windbreaks to decrease vector wind spread, control of weeds (alternative mite hosts), use of healthy plants sources, and controlling the movement of people and material in orchard. Although resistance has been observed between different Citrus species, few studies have been conducted in this area in order to identify commercial resistant varieties. One study developed using a hybrid population suggests that inheritance of resistance to leprosis may be controlled by only a few genes.

== Resources ==
- Citrus Diseases. Leprosis (USDA-University of Florida)
- Citrus leprosis rhabdovirus (European and Mediterranean Plant Protection Organization)
