= Bluehearts =

Bluehearts and Blue Hearts may refer to:

- Buchnera americana, American bluehearts flowering plant
- Buchnera floridana, Florida bluehearts flowering plant
- Operation Bluehearts, plan for an amphibious landing during the Korean War
- The Blue Hearts, Japanese punk band
  - The Blue Hearts (album), their 1987 debut album
- Blue Hearts (album) by Bob Mould
