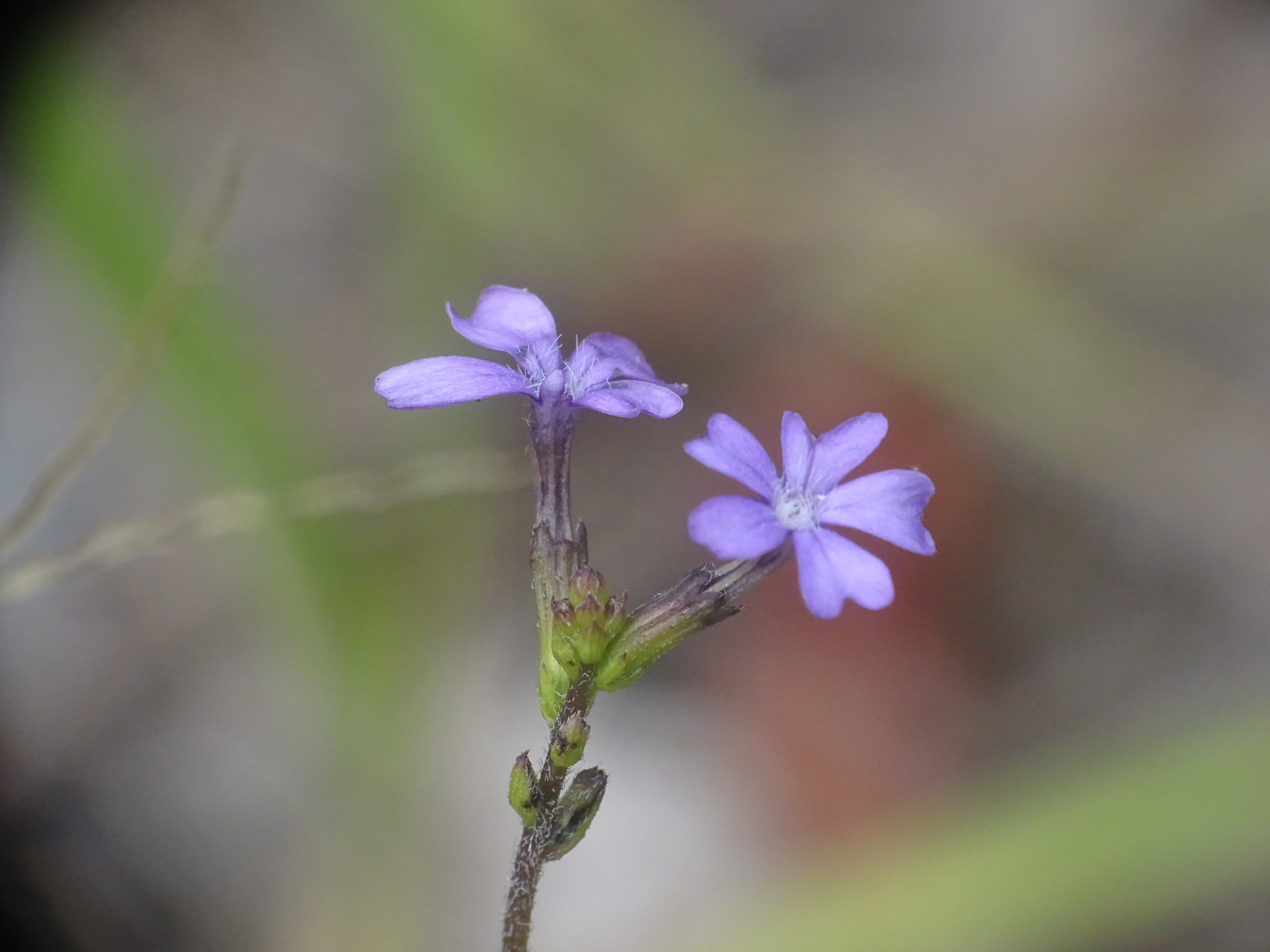
- Flowers

Conservation status
- Secure (NatureServe)

Scientific classification
- Kingdom: Plantae
- Clade: Tracheophytes
- Clade: Angiosperms
- Clade: Eudicots
- Clade: Asterids
- Order: Lamiales
- Family: Orobanchaceae
- Genus: Buchnera
- Species: B. floridana

Binomial name
- Buchnera floridana Gand.

Synonyms
- Buchnera breviflora Pennell

= Buchnera floridana =

Species of plant

Buchnera floridana, the Florida bluehearts, is a species of flowering plant in the family Orobanchaceae. It is native to the southeastern USA, Texas, eastern Mexico, Belize, Guatemala, Panama, and most of the Caribbean islands. A hemiparasitic biennial, it is found mostly in wet areas such as open pinelands, flatwoods, and pitcher-plant bogs of the Gulf Coastal Plain.

== Description ==
B. floridana is a hairy perennial with simple, erect stems that grow between 40–80 cm (16–31 in) tall. The oppositely-arranged leaves are elliptic to ovate-lanceolate in shape with entire or irregularly serrate margins. The leaves grow to 5–15 mm (0.20–0.59 in) wide and 3–7 cm (1.2–2.8 in) long. Unlike Buchnera americana, the leaves are not 3-veined.

The inflorescence of B. floridana is an open spike with bilaterally symmetrical flowers that are purple or white in color. The flowers have 5 petals that form a tube and bend abruptly at right angles. There are up to four fertile stamens, each bearing anthers with a single pollen sac. The capsule seed is 5-6 mm in size and ovoid or pyriform in shape.

== Ecology ==
B. floridana is mostly restricted to the coastal plain of the southeastern United States. Habitats include pine savannas, flatwoods, seepage bogs, and sandy roadsides

B. floridana is considered to be of low forage value. It serves as a host plant for Brevipalpus phoenicis, which vectors viral diseases such as citrus leprosis disease.
