= Helpmekaar Kollege =

Location
- cnr. Empire Road and Melle Street, Parktown; Johannesburg, Gauteng; South Africa; 26.1898°S 28.0334°E

Information
- School type: Private & Boarding
- Motto: Komaan
- Religious affiliation: Christianity
- Established: 22 June 1921; 105 years ago
- School district: District 9
- Headmistress: Mrs Jana Theron
- Exam board: IEB
- Grades: 8–12
- Gender: All
- Age: 13 to 18
- Enrollment: 1,300 pupils
- Language: Afrikaans
- Schedule: 07:30 - 13:30
- Campus: Urban Campus
- Campus type: Suburban
- Colours: Gold; Brown; White
- Nickname: Helpies
- Newspaper: www.helpieflitse.com
- Houses: Empire, Melle, Smuts
- Website: www.helpmekaar.co.za

Helpmekaar Kollege is a private Afrikaans medium co-educational high school situated in Braamfontein, in the city of Johannesburg in the Gauteng province of South Africa. It was among the first Afrikaans high schools in Gauteng to be privately owned after it was privatized in 1994, and it remains among the only private Afrikaans high schools in central Gauteng.

== History ==
Helpmekaar was the first Afrikaans high school in Johannesburg. The school was started by a group of Afrikaners who wanted their children to have an alternative to English high schools. The school was officially started in 1921 in the Irene Church opposite the Union Ground. Construction of the school started on 19 September 1925 with the foundation stone being laid by General Barry Hertzog. The land was donated by the Johannesburg City Council at Milner Park, Braamfontein. The school badge was designed by a matric pupil of 1925, A.J. Lessing.

The slogan of the school "KOMAAN" was derived from a poem by Jan F. E. Celliers by the same title. Literally translated, Komaan Helpmekaar means “come on, help each other”.

== Campus ==
The Helpmekaar Campus is situated on the corner of Empire and Melle Street, Braamfontein, Johannesburg.

The school building consists of five parts:

- The Old Building (with the clock tower on top)
- The Newer Buildings
- The Terraces
- The Far East
- The DI Hub
- The Far West
- The Towers

The school also has a rugby field, uniform shop, three tennis courts, two netball practice courts, two halls, a swimming pool and a boarding house.

== Curriculum ==
Helpmekaar follows the IEB curriculum.

Pupils are also given the opportunity to write the SAT, a standardized college admission test used in the United States, in Grade 11.

== Notable alumni ==
- Mimi Coertse
- Marius Kloppers
- Odile Harington
- Gert Potgieter
- Louise Prinsloo
- Dan Roodt
- Magdalena K.P. Smith Meyer
- Jané Mulder

== See also ==
- List of boarding schools
