= Buchnera =

Buchnera may refer to:

- Buchnera (bacterium), a genus of proteobacteria
- Buchnera (plant), a plant genus from the family Orobanchaceae
