= Prinsloo =

Prinsloo is an Afrikaans surname.

It can refer to:

- Antoni Michael Prinsloo (1862–1931), Second Boer War general
- Behati Prinsloo (born 1989), Namibian model
- Boom Prinsloo (born 1989), South African rugby player
- Christine Prinsloo (born 1952), Zimbabwean hockey player
- Hanli Prinsloo, South African freediver and ocean conservationist
- Gouws Prinsloo (born 1990), South African rugby player
- Hendrik Frederik Prinsloo (1784–1816), South African ringleader of the Slachter's Nek Rebellion (Slagtersnek), son of Marthinus Prinsloo (President)
- Hendrik Frederik Prinsloo (1890–1966), South African colonel
- Henno Prinsloo (born 1987), Namibian cricketer
- Jan Prinsloo (1935–1966), South African rugby union and rugby league footballer
- Karin Prinsloo (born 1972), South African martial artist
- Karin Prinsloo (born 1989), South African swimmer
- Louise Prinsloo (born 1946), South African author and radio script writer
- Marthinus Prinsloo (President) (1751–1825), South African president of the Republic of Graaff-Reinet
- Marthinus Prinsloo (1838–1903), Orange Free State farmer, politician and commander-in-chief in the Second Boer War
- Maureen Prinsloo (fl. 1995–1998), Canadian politician
- P. J. Prinsloo (born 1978), South African actor
- Sandra Prinsloo (born 1947), South African actress
- Troyden Prinsloo (born 1985), South African swimmer
