= Carex litorosa =

- Carex litorosa in a salt marsh along the southern South Island coast

Conservation status
- Nationally Vulnerable (NZ TCS)

Scientific classification
- Kingdom: Plantae
- Clade: Tracheophytes
- Clade: Angiosperms
- Clade: Monocots
- Clade: Commelinids
- Order: Poales
- Family: Cyperaceae
- Genus: Carex
- Species: C. litorosa

Binomial name
- Carex litorosa L.H.Bailey

Synonyms
- Carex australis sensu Kirk Carex litoralis sensu Petrie

Species of plant

Carex litorosa, commonly known as sea sedge, is a tussock-forming species of perennial sedge in the family Cyperaceae. It is endemic to New Zealand and is listed as Threatened - Nationally Vulnerable according to the New Zealand Threat Classification.

== Description ==
The sedge has an upright habit and can reach a height of 80 cm (31 in) but is more often smaller. It appears as a reddish to pale green coloured tussocks that have curly tops. The leaves are about as long as the stems and has a width of 1.5 mm (0.059 in). They are curved on one side and flat on the other and are slightly serrated along the edges. The upright and cylindrical flower stems produce light brown coloured spikes. The plant flowers between October and December and fruits between December and April although the seed heads can remain for much longer.

== Taxonomy ==
C. litorosa is in the famiy Cyperaceae. The species was first described in 1889 by the American botanist Liberty Hyde Bailey as a part of the Memoirs of the Torrey Botanical Club.

== Distribution and habitat ==
C. litorosa is endemic to New Zealand. Its range is in the North Island, South Island and Stewart Island. It is often situated along tidal riverbeds that are sandy and in brackish to salty marshlands.

== Conservation status ==
The species is listed as Threatened - Nationally Vulnerable in the most recent assessment (2023) of the New Zealand Threatened Classification for plants. This status is a change for the worse from the At Risk - Declining listing in the 2017 assessment.

In addition to qualifiers RR ("Range restricted"), DPT ("Data poor: Trend), "DPR" (Data poor: Recognition") and DPS ("Data poor: size"), C. litorosa also has the qualifier CI ("Climate impact"). The CI qualifier has been used by the Department of Conservation since 2021 to flag species in its conservation assessments that are "adversely affected by long-term climate trends and/or extreme climatic events."

In addition to climate change, other treats to C. litorosa include coastal development leading to habitat loss, and encroaching by non-native grasses and sedges.

== See also ==
- List of Carex species

== Gallery ==
Habit

Habitat

Fruits

Close up of fruits

Habit

Close up of flowers
