= Gert Potgieter =

Gert Potgieter is the name of:

- Gert Potgieter (tenor) (1929–1977), South African tenor
- Gert Potgieter (athlete) (born 1937), South African hurdle runner
