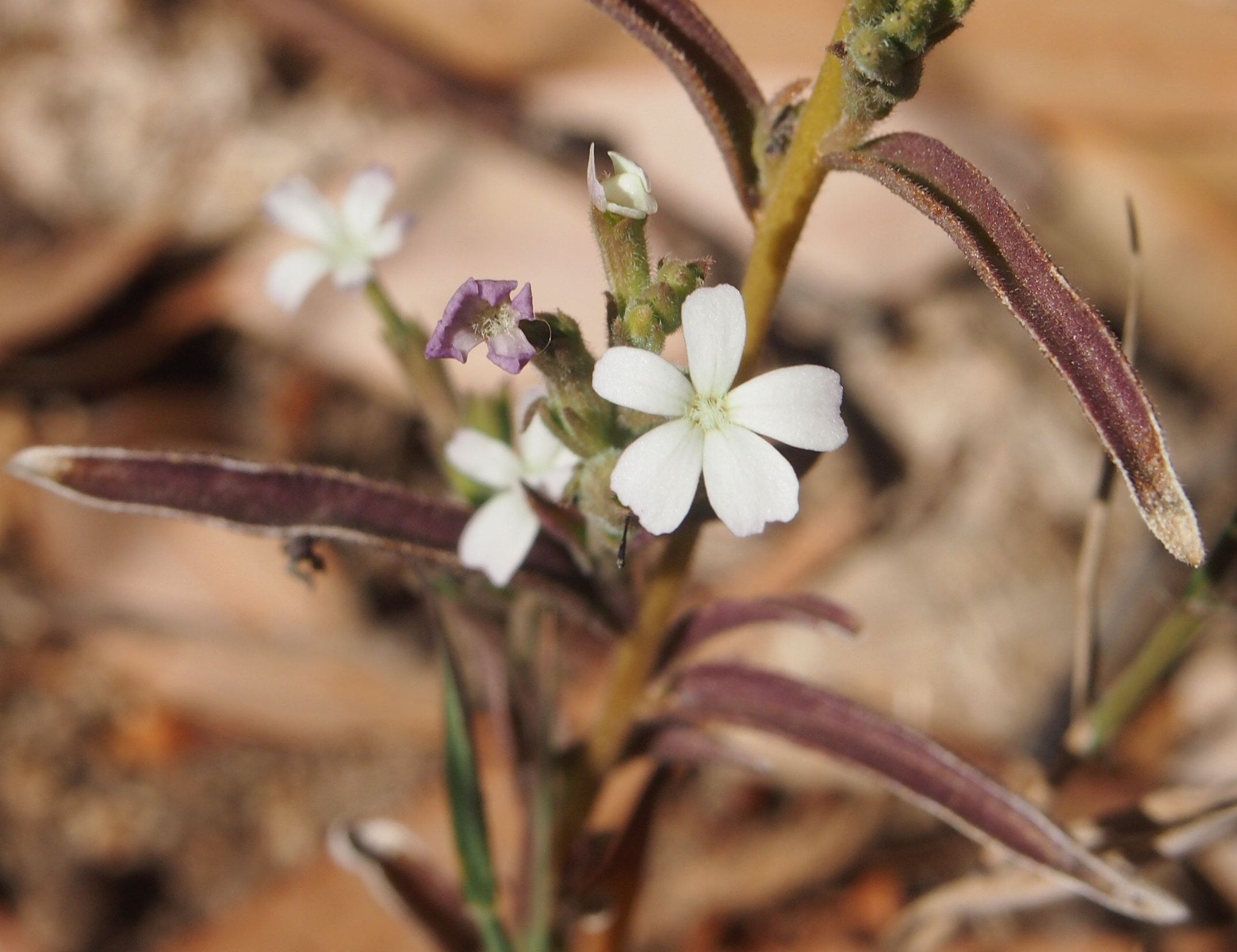

Scientific classification
- Kingdom: Plantae
- Clade: Tracheophytes
- Clade: Angiosperms
- Clade: Eudicots
- Clade: Asterids
- Order: Lamiales
- Family: Orobanchaceae
- Genus: Buchnera
- Species: B. linearis

Binomial name
- Buchnera linearis R.Br.

= Buchnera linearis =

blackrod

Species of plant

Buchnera linearis, the blackrod, is a species of flowering plant in the family Orobanchaceae. A short lived, semi-parasitic herb up to 60 cm tall, found in northern Australia and Papua New Guinea. This species was one of the many first described by Scottish botanist Robert Brown in his 1810 work Prodromus Florae Novae Hollandiae.
