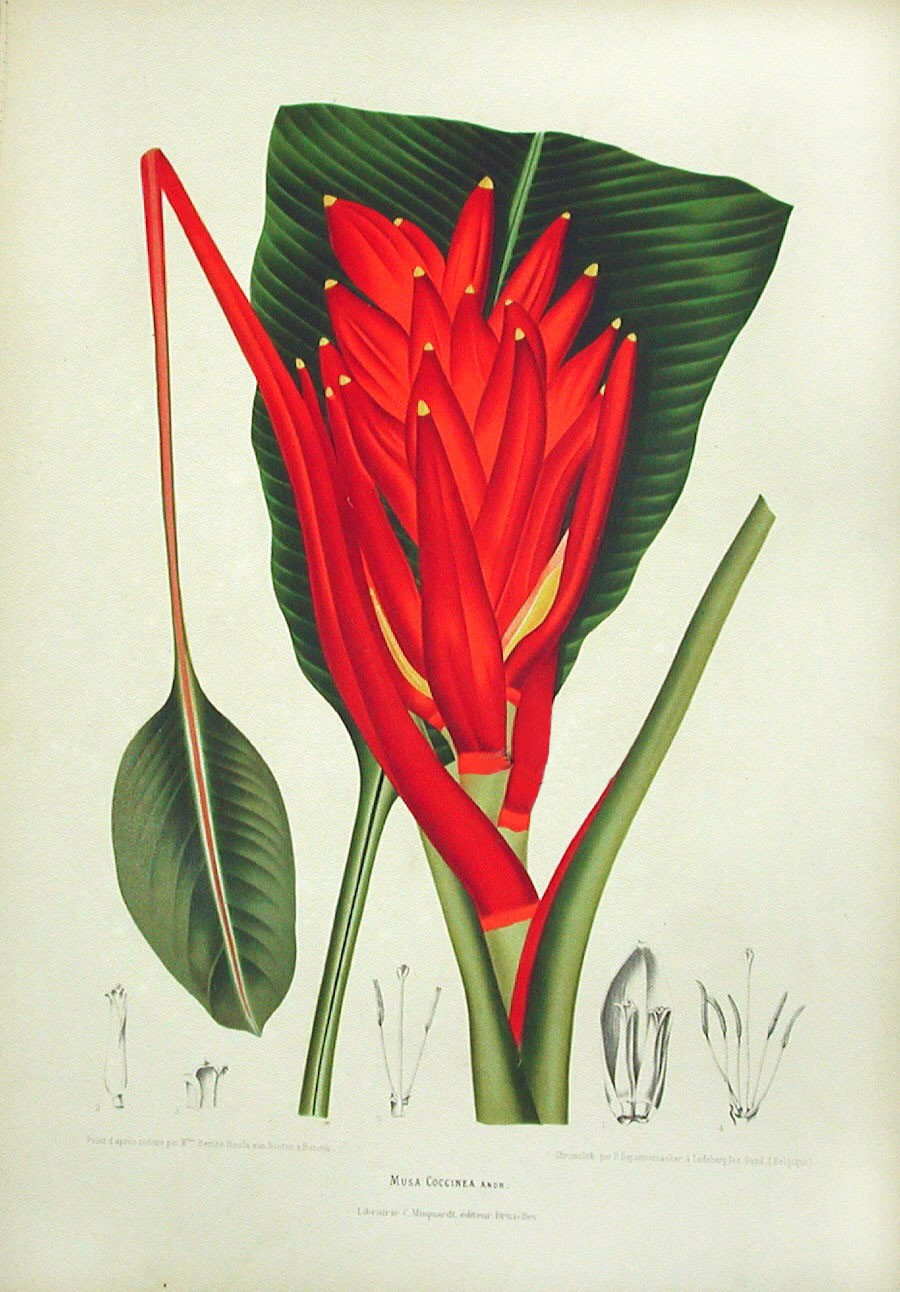
- Illustration of inflorescence

Conservation status
- Endangered (IUCN 3.1)

Scientific classification
- Kingdom: Plantae
- Clade: Embryophytes
- Clade: Tracheophytes
- Clade: Angiosperms
- Clade: Monocots
- Clade: Commelinids
- Order: Zingiberales
- Family: Musaceae
- Genus: Musa
- Section: Musa sect. Callimusa
- Species: M. coccinea

Binomial name
- Musa coccinea Andrews

Synonyms
- Quesnelia lamarckii Baker

= Musa coccinea =

Scarlet banana

Species of flowering plant

Musa coccinea, commonly known as scarlet banana or red-flowering banana, is a species of flowering plant in the banana and plantain family Musaceae, native to tropical China (in Guangdong, Guangxi, and southeastern Yunnan) and Vietnam. It is a bat-pollinated evergreen perennial, placed in section Callimusa (now including the former section Australimusa), having a diploid chromosome number of 2n = 20.

The flower cluster is more rounded than in the related species M. beccarii. It is made up of erect spirals of red bracts which enclose tubular yellow flowers. The inedible fruits are orange, only about 2 cm (0.8 in) long, and contain seeds. The species is cultivated for its ornamental value, being grown, for example, along with heliconias in commercial farms in Hawaii. It does not tolerate temperatures below 10 °C (50 °F), so in temperate zones requires protection during the winter months. In the UK it has gained the Royal Horticultural Society's Award of Garden Merit.

M. coccinea is a known host in the New World of the red palm mite (Raoiella indica).

== Taxonomy ==
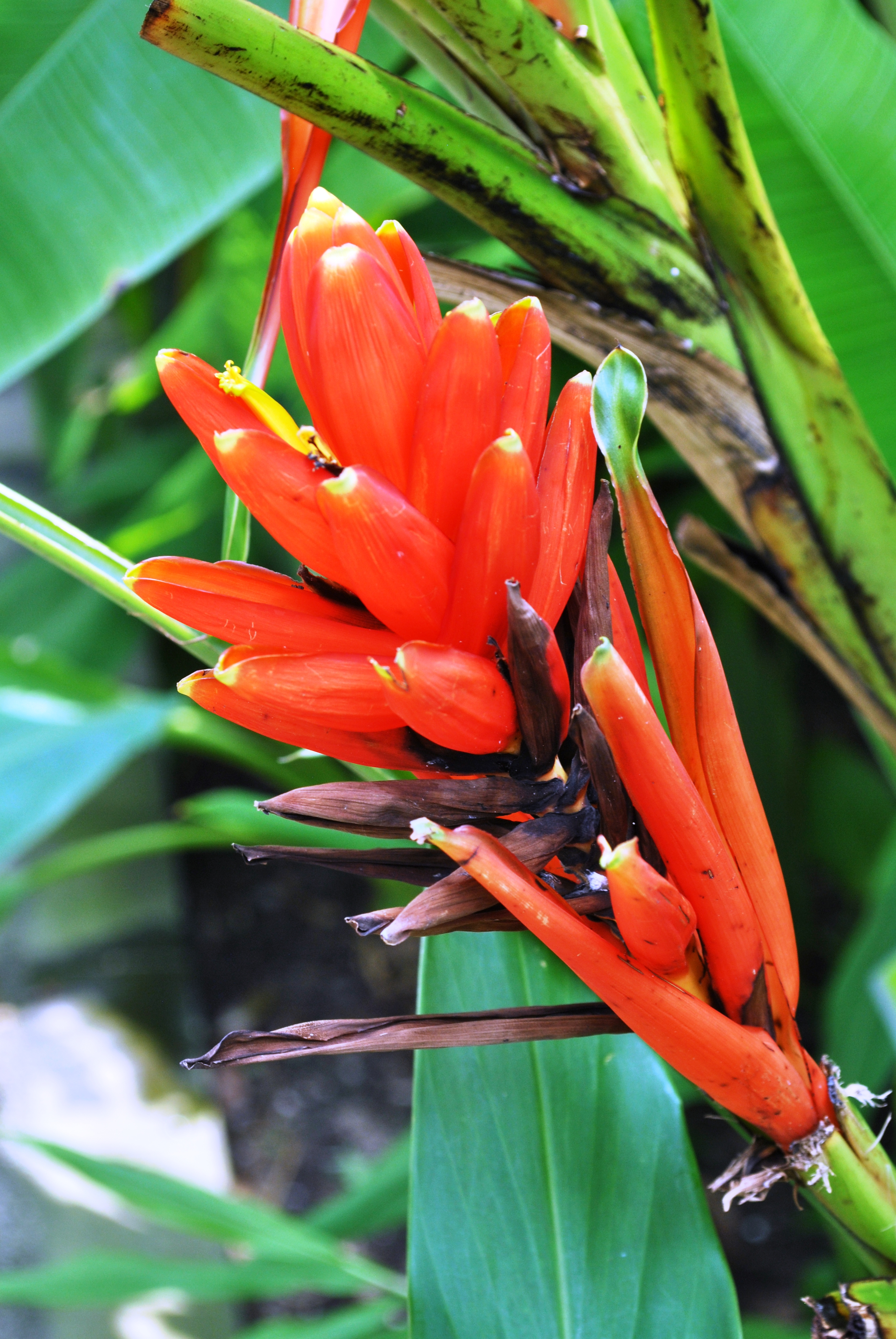
Flower

Musa coccinea was described by Andrews in 1799. M. uranoscopos Lour. (an illegitimate name) is often incorrectly given as a synonym. Loureiro's 1790 account is confused. He refers to an illustration in Rumphius' 1747 Herbarium Amboinense, hence this is the type of his name. However, this illustration had previously been used in Linnaeus' description of M. troglodytarum, so M. uranoscopos Lour. is a superfluous name for M. troglodytarum. Loureiro's description is of M. coccinea; however the type rather than the description determines the synonymity, so M. uranoscopos Lour. is not a synonym of M. coccinea.
