= Magdalena K. P. Smith Meyer =

South African acarologist

- Born: 9 October 1931; Leeudoringstad, South Africa
- Died: 21 October 2004 (aged 73)
- Other names: Lenie Meyer; Magdalena K. P. Meyer (Smith)
- Education: BSc (Botany & Zoology) 1951; MSc (Zoology) 1953; DSc (Zoology) 1958
- Alma mater: Potchefstroom University
- Scientific career
- Fields: Acarology
- Institutions: Plant Protection Research Institute

Magdalena Kathrina Petronella Smith Meyer (9 October 1931 – 21 October 2004) was a South African acarologist who was regarded as a world authority on plant-feeding mites of agricultural importance and was known as the "mother of red-spider mites of the world". She described more than 700 new species and 25 new genera, mostly of mites of agricultural importance. Meyer was involved in the promotion of biological control of mites using predatory mites, spiders and insects.

== Education ==
Magdalena Meyer (also known as Lenie) was born on a farm near Leeudoringstad, South Africa on 9 October 1931. She matriculated from Helpmekaar High School for Girls, Johannesburg in 1948. She enrolled at Potchefstroom University in 1949 where she completed her BSc (cum laude) in Botany and Zoology in 1951; followed by an MSc (cum laude) in Zoology in 1953 and a Higher Diploma in Librarianship (cum laude) in 1958. Her dissertation on prostigmatic mites associated with plants in South Africa was completed in 1959, which earned her a DSc in Zoology.

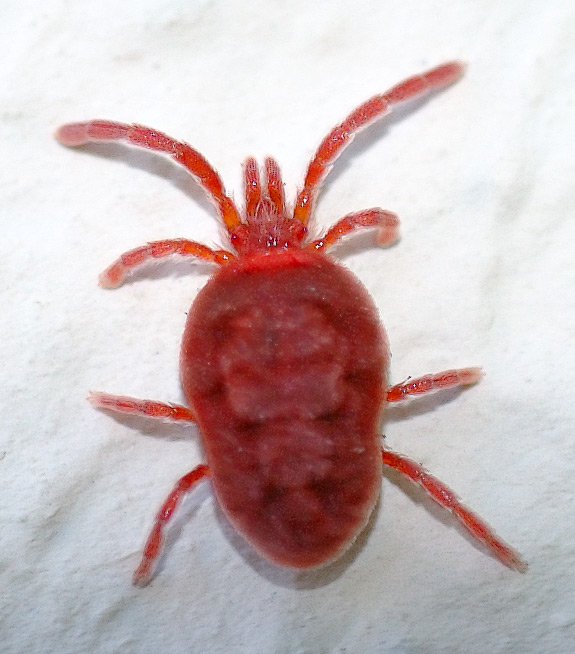
Trombidium holosericeum, a red mite

== Career ==
Meyer started working at the Plant Protection Research Institute (PPRI) of the South African Agricultural Research Council (ARC), based in Pretoria. In 1964 she received a bursary from the Canadian Research Council and over the next year she visited several acarologists in Canada, the United States of America and Europe.

In 1964 she was appointed manager of the Economic Zoology (Arachnida and Nematology) subdivision at the ARC and in 1970 she became Assistant-Director of the PPRI. In 1989 she was one of the first researchers to be promoted to Specialist Scientist and in 1994, shortly before her retirement, she was appointed Senior Specialist Scientist.

Despite being retired, Meyer continued to work as an associate researcher at the PPRI. Meyer supervised 6 MSc students and 7 PhD students during her career and acted as examiner for a further 14 students.

== Contributions ==
Meyer was instrumental in the development of acarology in Southern Africa, leading to better international understanding of some of the most economically and agriculturally important agricultural pests that belong to the Spider mite family, Tetranychidae and the flat mites Tenuipalpidae. She described more than 700 new species and 25 new genera of mites, including the genera Capedulia, Coleacarus and Krugeria.

In 1959 Meyer established the National Collection of Acari, which is now one of the largest mite collections in the Southern Hemisphere with more than 120,000 specimens, representing more than 47 families, 200 genera, and 1200 species, more than half of which had been collected during her time at the PPRI.

Meyer developed several techniques for the collection of mites and made important contributions to their control on various plants, including citrus, cotton, deciduous fruit, grapes, berries, vegetables, tobacco and other field crops, flowers and ornamental plants. She was involved in the dissemination of information on the control of mites and was actively involved in the registration of new miticides and in advising chemical companies on their spraying trials as well as evaluating the results thereof.

Meyer made special efforts to promote the biological control of mites using spiders, insects and predatory mites. These predatory mites were collected from several Acacia species.

Meyer collaborated with researchers from Costa Rica, Israel and Portugal and helped countries across the world with identification. She also advised on economically important mites on different crops to countries in southern Africa including Angola, Malawi and Zimbabwe.

== Recognition ==
Meyer was chief editor of the editorial board of the International Journal of Acarology (IJA) until 1997. In 1998 the IJA launched the M K P Meyer fellowship in recognition of her contributions to acarology. The IJA again awarded her for the second time, in appreciation of her contributions to acarology in 2002.

== Selected publications ==
Meyer published more than 100 scientific papers including seven memoirs and two handbooks on mites of crops. She developed a checklist that covers the 60 economically important mite pest species in Southern Africa.

Amongst other works, Meyer co-contributed to a chapter on Acari in the Biogeography and Ecology of Southern Africa series:

- Smith Meyer, Magdalena K. P.; Loots, G. C. (1978). "Acari". Biogeography and Ecology of Southern Africa. Monographiae Biologicae. Vol. 31. Dordrecht: Springer Netherlands. pp. 703–718. doi:10.1007/978-94-009-9951-0_19. ISBN 978-94-009-9953-4. ISSN 0077-0639.

In 1983 she initiated the first biodiversity survey of mites. From the data collected in the survey she published four papers on the mite fauna of the South African National Parks. She was also senior author of the first checklist of Acari of the Ethiopian region and published articles on mite faunas of Cameroon, the Cape Verde Islands, Costa Rica, Israel, Zimbabwe and Yemen.

- Ueckermann, E.A.; Van Harten, A. & Meyer (Smith) M.K.P. "The mites and ticks (Acari) of Yemen: an annotated check-list." in Fauna of Arabia.
