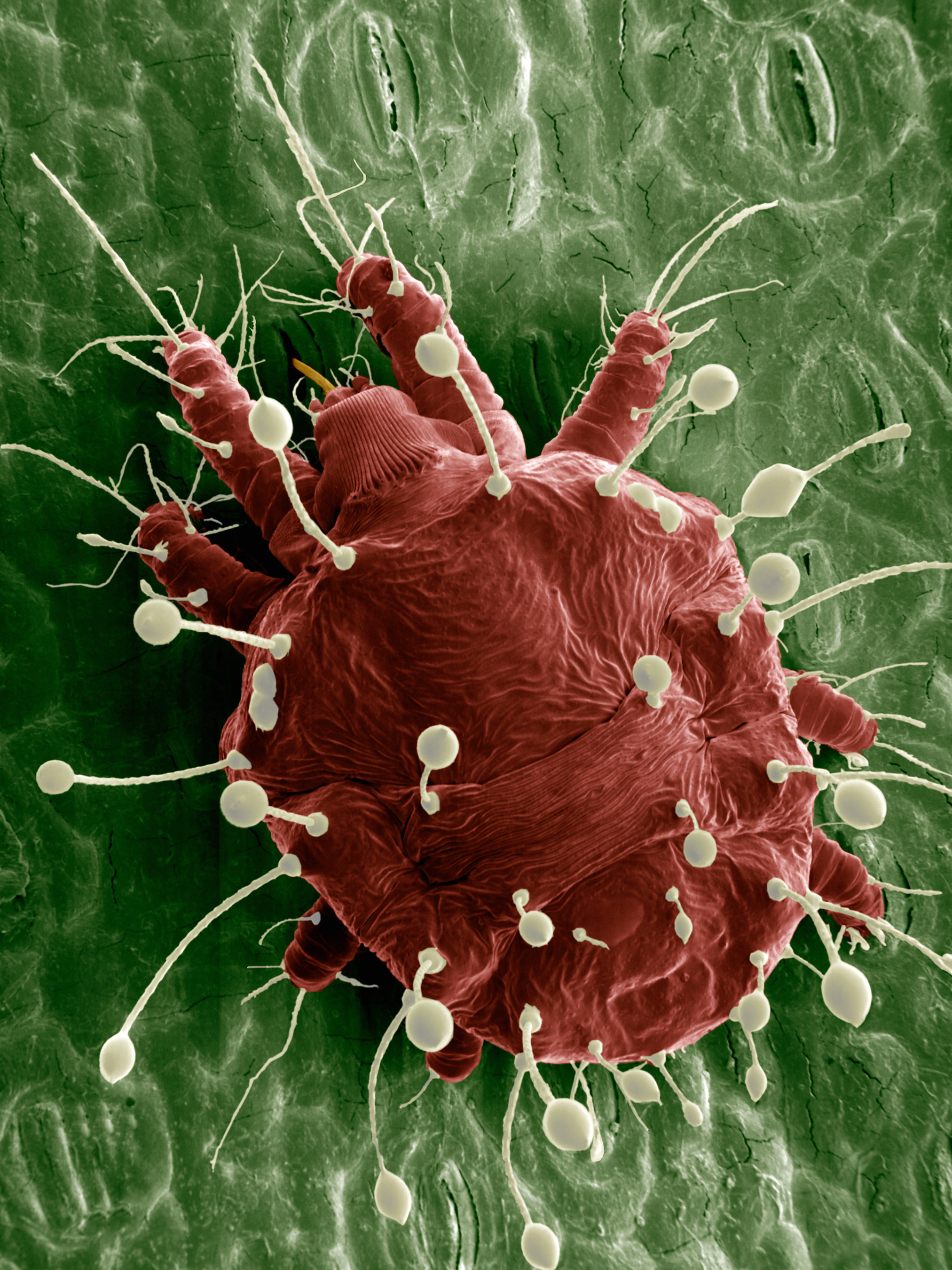
- Adult Raoiella indica, an SEM image with false-color added

Scientific classification
- Kingdom: Animalia
- Phylum: Arthropoda
- Subphylum: Chelicerata
- Class: Arachnida
- Order: Trombidiformes
- Family: Tenuipalpidae
- Genus: Raoiella
- Species: R. indica

Binomial name
- Raoiella indica Hirst, 1924

= Raoiella indica =

Species of mite

Raoiella indica, commonly known as the red palm mite, is a species of mite belonging to the family Tenuipalpidae. A pest of several species of palm in the Middle East and South East Asia, it is now becoming established throughout the Caribbean. The invasion of this species is the biggest mite explosion ever observed in the Americas.

== Distribution ==
This species is indigenous to Egypt, India, Iran, Israel, Mauritius, Oman, Pakistan, Philippines, Réunion, Saudi Arabia, Sri Lanka, Sudan, Thailand and the United Arab Emirates.

It is considered an invasive species in Dominican Republic, Guadeloupe, Puerto Rico, Saint Martin, Trinidad and Tobago, the US Virgin Islands, Grenada, (Note: The source says Granada, which is a city in Spain, and implausible in context. It is most likely a typographical error for Grenada, an island-country in the Caribbean.) Haiti and Jamaica.

In 2007, the red palm mite was discovered in Florida. As of April, 2009, this pest has been found at almost 400 sites in five counties there.

== Description ==
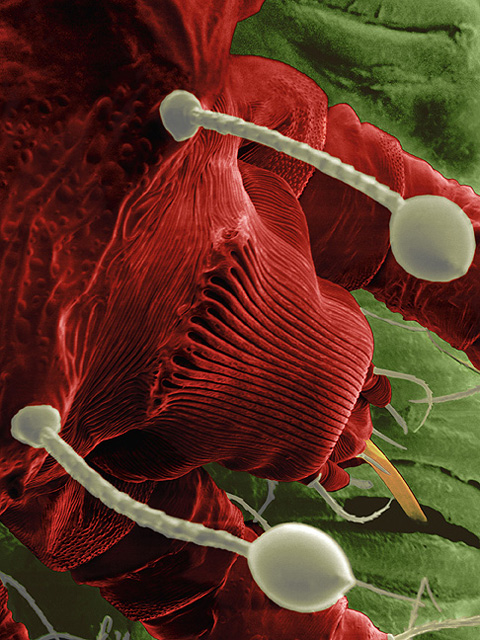
Detail of head

This species can be distinguished from most other mites by its colour, flat body, long spatulate setae, and droplets on the dorsal body setae. There is also a noticeable absence of the webbing associated with numerous other spider mites.

The red palm mite has a long, bright red, spatulate body. During all stages of life, this species is red, with adult females often showing black patches on their backs after feeding.

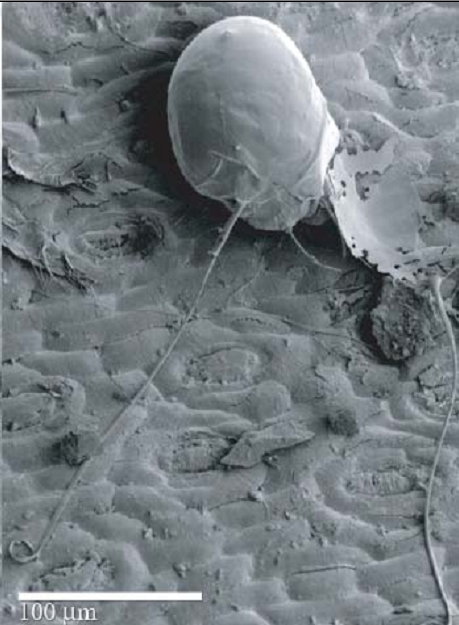
Red palm mite egg

Red palm mite eggs are 0.12 mm long and 0.09 wide. The eggs are smooth and can be found in groups attached to the underside of leaves.

Larvae are 0.18–.020 mm in length and only have three pairs of legs. Nymphs are 0.18–0.25 mm long.

Adults are approximately 0.32 mm long. Females are larger than males and have a triangular body.

== Life cycle ==
The egg stage ranges from 6 to 9 days. Development from egg to adult ranges from 23 to 28 days for females, and 20 to 22 days for males. The red palm mite lives for about 26 days.

== Hosts ==
This mite has been found on 32 different palm species. In the Caribbean, this species also infests banana plants, heliconias and gingers.

Known hosts of the red palm mite in the Caribbean and Florida as of 12–05–2009
Family	Location	Species	Common name
Palmae	Caribbean	Acoelorraphe wrightii , (Griseb.& H.A. Wendl.)	Everglades palm, paurotis palm
Palmae	Florida	Adonidia merrilli, (Becc.) Becc. Veitchia H.A. Wendl.)	Manila palm, Christmas palm
Palmae	Caribbean	Areca catechu	betel nut palm
Palmae	Caribbean	Areca, spp.	
Palmae	Florida	Aiphanes caryotifolia, (H.B.K.) H.A. Wendl.	Coyure palm, ruffle palm, spine palm
Palmae	Caribbean	Aiphanes, spp. Willd.	Multiple crown palm, ruffle palm
Palmae	Florida	Archontophoenix alexandrae, (F. Muell.)	Alexander palm, king palm
Palmae	Caribbean	Bactris plumeriana, Mart.	coco macaco, prickly pole
Palmae	Florida	Beccariophoenix madagascariensis, Jum. & H. Perrier	giant windowpane palm
Palmae	Caribbean	Bismarckia nobilis, Hildebr. & H.A. Wendl.	Bismarck palm
Palmae	Florida	Butia capitata, (Mart) Becc.	pindo palm, jelly palm
Palmae	Caribbean	Caryota mitis, Lour.	fishtail palm
Palmae	Caribbean	Chamaedorea, spp. Willd.	chamaedorea palm
Palmae	Florida	Coccothrinax miraguama, (H.B.K.) Becc.	Miraguama palm
Palmae	Florida	Cocos nucifera, L.	coconut palm
Palmae	Florida	Corypha umbraculifera, L.	Talipot palm
Palmae	Caribbean	Dictyosperma album, (Bory) H.A. Wendl. & Drude ex Scheff.	princess palm, hurricane palm
Palmae	Caribbean	Dypsis decaryi, (Jum.) Beentje & J. Dransf.	triangle palm
Palmae	Caribbean	Dypsis lutescens, (H.A. Wendl.) Beentje & J.Dransf.	areca palm, golden cane palm, butterfly palm
Palmae	Caribbean	Elaeis guineensis, Jacq.	African oil palm
Palmae	Caribbean	Licuala grandis, H.A. Wendl.	licuala palm, ruffled fan palm
Palmae	Florida	Livistona, chinensis (Jacq.) R. Br. ex Mart.	Chinese fan palm
Palmae	Florida	Phoenix canariensis, Hort. ex Chabaud	Canary Islands date palm
Palmae	Florida	Phoenix dactylifera, L.	date palm
Palmae	Florida	Phoenix reclinata, Jacq.	Senegal date palm
Palmae	Florida	Phoenix roebelenii, O’Brien	pygmy date palm, roebelenii palm
Palmae	Florida	Pritchardia pacifica, B.C. Seem. & H.A. Wendl.	Fiji fan palm
Palmae	Florida	Pseudophoenix sargentii, H.A. Wendl. ex Sarg.	buccaneer palm, Sargent's cherry palm
Palmae	Caribbean	Pseudophoenix vinifera, (Mart.) Becc.	cacheo, katié, wine palm
Palmae	Florida	Ptychosperma elegans, (R. Br.) Blume	solitaire palm, Alexander palm
Palmae	Florida	Ptychosperma macarthurii, (H.A. Wendl.) Nichols	Macarthur palm
Palmae	Caribbean	Rhapis excelsa, (Thunb.) A. Henry	lady palm, bamboo palm
Palmae	Caribbean	Roystonea borinquena, O.F. Cook	Puerto Rico royal palm
Palmae	Caribbean	Roystonea regia, (HBK) O.F. Cook	Florida royal palm
Palmae	Florida	Schippia concolor, Burret	silver pimento palm
Palmae	Florida	Syagrus romanzoffiana, (Cham.) Glassman	queen palm
Palmae	Caribbean	Syagrus schizophylla, (Mart.) Glassman	arikury palm
Palmae	Florida	Thrinax radiata, Lodd. ex J.A. & J.H. Schultes	Florida thatch palm
Palmae	Florida	Veitchia, spp. H.A. Wendl.	Manila palm
Palmae	Caribbean	Washingtonia filifera, (Lind. ex André) H.A. Wendl.	fan palm
Palmae	Florida	Washingtonia robusta, H.A. Wendl.	Mexican fan palm
Palmae	Florida	Wodyetia bifurcata, A.K. Irvine	foxtail palm
Musaceae	Caribbean	Heliconia bihai, (L.) L.	Macaw flower
Musaceae	Caribbean	Heliconia caribaea, Lam.	wild plantain, Balisier
Musaceae	Caribbean	Heliconia psittacorum, L. f.	parrot flower
Musaceae	Caribbean	Heliconia rostrata, Ruiz & Pavon	lobster claw heliconia
Musaceae	Florida	Heliconia, spp.	
Musaceae	Caribbean	Musa acuminata, Colla	edible banana, plantain
Musaceae	Caribbean	Musa balbisiana, Colla	wild banana
Musaceae	Caribbean	Musa coccinea Andrews	red-flowering banana
Musaceae	Caribbean	Musa corniculata, Rumph.	red banana
Musaceae	Florida	Musa, spp.	banana, plantain
Musaceae	Caribbean	Musa acuminata × balbisiana, L.	edible banana, plantain
Musaceae	Caribbean	Ravenala madagascariensis, Sonn.	traveler's tree
Musaceae	Caribbean	Strelitzia reginae, Aiton	bird of paradise, crane flower
Pandanaceae	Caribbean	Pandanus utilis, Bory	screw pine
Zingiberaceae	Caribbean	Alpinia purpurata, (Vieill.) K. Schum.	red ginger, jungle king/queen
Zingiberaceae	Florida	Alpinia zerumbet, (Pers.) B.L. Burtt & R.M. Sm.	shell ginger, pink porcelain lily
Zingiberaceae	Caribbean	Etlingera elatior, (Jack.) R.M. Sm.	red torch ginger

== Survey, detection and damage ==
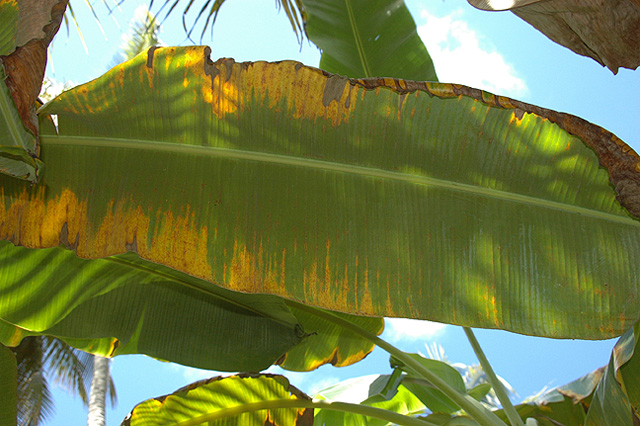
Banana leaves damaged by red palm mites

The red palm mite forms colonies on the undersides of leaves. There, they feed on the contents of the cells of the leaves. This feeding can cause localized yellowing of the leaves.

Adults are usually visible to the naked eye.

== Dispersal ==
Like most other plant feeding mites, this species disperses on the wind. Tropical storms and hurricanes can distribute this mite over wide areas.

== Management ==
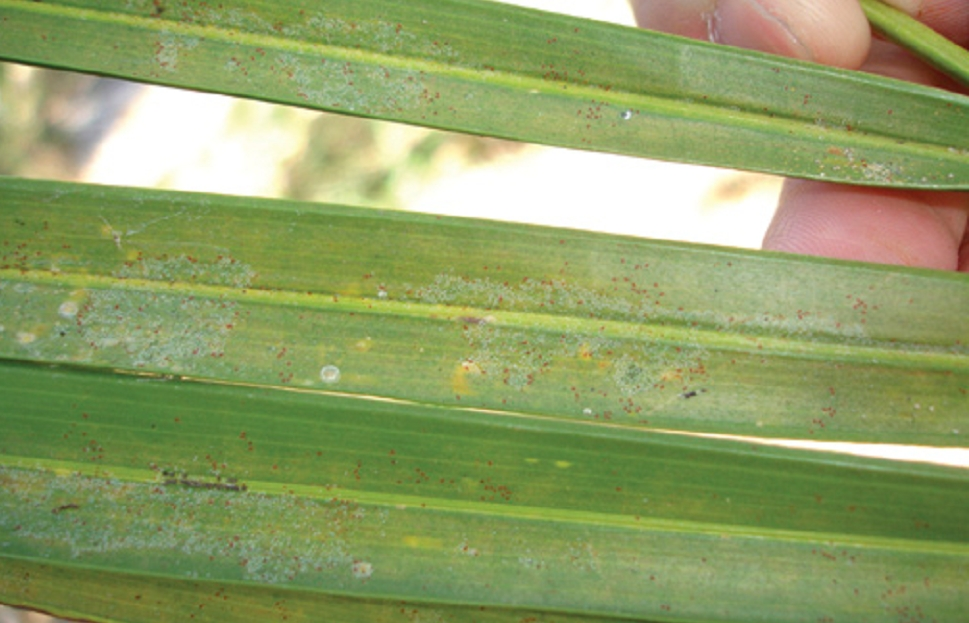
red palm mite damage to palm leaf

Chemical control is considered impractical due to the large size of most palms. Some biological control agents have proven useful in the Eastern Hemisphere, including predatory mites, beetles, lacewings and other mite predators.

== See also ==
- Invasive species
- Parasite
