= Acaricis urigersoni =

Scientific classification
- Kingdom: Animalia
- Phylum: Arthropoda
- Subphylum: Chelicerata
- Class: Arachnida
- Order: Trombidiformes
- Family: Tenuipalpidae
- Genus: Acaricis
- Species: A. urigersoni

Binomial name
- Acaricis urigersoni Xu & Zhang, 2013

Species of mite

Acaricis urigersoni is a species of mite.

== Distribution ==
The species is found in New Zealand.
