= Gahniacarus =

Scientific classification
- Kingdom: Animalia
- Phylum: Arthropoda
- Subphylum: Chelicerata
- Class: Arachnida
- Order: Trombidiformes
- Family: Tenuipalpidae
- Genus: Gahniacarus; Beard & Ochoa, 2011

Genus of mites

Gahniacarus is a genus of flat mites in the family Tenuipalpidae, containing the following species:

- Gahniacarus gersonus Beard & Ochoa, 2011
- Gahniacarus tuberculatus Beard & Ochoa, 2011
