= Orchid fleck virus =

Virus classification
- (unranked): Virus
- Realm: Riboviria
- Kingdom: Orthornavirae
- Phylum: Negarnaviricota
- Class: Monjiviricetes
- Order: Mononegavirales
- Family: Rhabdoviridae
- Genus: Dichorhavirus
- Species: Dichorhavirus orchidaceae

Synonyms
- Orchid fleck dichorhavirus

Species of virus

Orchid fleck virus (OFV), is a rhabdovirus that is transmitted by the false spider mite, Brevipalpus californicus. OFV causes necrotic and chlorotic lesions on the leaves of many genera in the family Orchidaceae.

== Introduction ==
Orchid fleck virus, despite its presence worldwide, only affects a small spectrum of human life. Orchids are not used for food but rather serve mainly as ornamental decoration. Therefore, only about 2 to 3 scientific reports are written about OFV each year. The whole genome of OFV has been sequenced and its six main protein products have been sequenced as well.

== Virion morphology ==
OFV was first described as bacilliform but depending on the method of preparation, OFV can appear bullet-shaped or bacilliform. On average, OFV is 40 nm in diameter and between 100 and 150 nm long. Each viral particles is organized into a tight 25 turn helix, with a pitch of about 4.5 nm.

== Genomics ==
OFV contains two ssRNA molecules, RNA1 and RNA2, of 6413 and 6001 base pairs, respectively. GenBank contains the whole sequenced genome of OFV. RNA1 (GenBank AB244417) codes for five proteins whereas RNA2 (GenBank AB244418) only codes for one. Both strands possess open reading frames (ORF), which are read in the negative sense.

RNA1

- ORF1: Nucleocapsid (N) protein
- ORF2: Phosphoprotein (P)
- ORF3: Proteins involved in viral cell-to-cell movement
- ORF4: Matrix (M) protein
- ORF5: Glycoprotein (G)

RNA2

- ORF6: Polymerase (L) protein (RNA-dependent RNA polymerase)

== Pathophysiology ==
Chlorotic and necrotic flecks, spots, and/or ringspots, as well as yellow flecks or spots are all symptoms of an OFV infection. Studies have also shown that OFV may prevent the propagation of other viruses in an already OFV-infected plant.

=== Vector ===
The false spider mite, B. californicus serves as the major vector for OFV. Brevipalpus mites go through four distinct, active life stages, each separated by nonmotile chrysalis stages. The protonymph, deutonymph, and adult stages can infect their host plants with OFV, whereas the larval stage is not infectious. Even after three weeks of incubation of an OFV-positive mite on an OFV-resistant plant, B. californicus proved to still be infectious, showing that OFV is persistent.

=== Hosts ===
OFV is able to naturally infect around 50 different species in 31 genera, all belonging to the family Orchidaceae. 25 other species from 11 non-orchid families have been infected through sap transmission or artificial viral inoculation.

=== Life cycle ===
Studies have not shown whether or not OFV actually replicates within B. californicus but electron microscopy has revealed an intricate viral life cycle within the host cells.

Viral ssRNA is replicated and transcribed into mRNA in the host cell's nucleus. Viral mRNA is then exported out of the nucleus into the cytoplasm where it is translated into viral protein by the host's ribosomes. The viral proteins then reenter the nucleus where they aggregate into a viroplasm. There, the various viral structural proteins assemble with both strands of ssRNA to form complete OFV particles. These particles often cluster in between the inner and outer nuclear membranes, causing visible projections which often evaginate into cytoplasmic vesicles. Electron microscopy has revealed clusters of viral particles positioned perpendicular to the inner nuclear membrane, the endoplasmic reticulum, as well as the aforementioned cytoplasmic vesicles, forming distinctive “spoked wheel” structures.

=== Effects on fitness ===
Infected orchids don't bloom as well as healthy ones, affecting efficacy of pollination and fertilization. Also, the orchids that do bloom look lifeless making them less attractive on the cut flower market.

== Epidemiology ==
Cases of orchid fleck virus or OF-like viruses have been reported in Australia, Brazil, China, Columbia, Costa Rica, Denmark, Germany, Japan, Korea, South Africa, and the United States, i.e. every continent except for Antarctica.

Due to the fact that viruses depend on their host cell for replication, OFV cannot be cultured independently. However, two non-orchid indicator hosts (plants used in research that show characteristic symptoms of specific viral infections) C. quinoa and T. expansa are commonly used for viral inoculation and isolation.

There are no known pathogens of OFV itself but its vector, B. californicus has a symbiotic relationship with bacteria of the genus Cardinium. The symbiont is the cause of the mites' thelytokous method of reproduction (where females are produced from unfertilized eggs) and the explanation for the absence of male B. californicus mites.

=== Diagnosis ===
Thin tissue samples from plants with visible symptoms of OFV can undergo:

- Electron microscopy to visualize virions and complete viral particles
- Serological analysis to identify and isolate specific viral proteins
- Reverse Transcription-Polymerase Chain Reaction to identify viral RNA

=== Prevention ===
Methods for preventing the spread of OFV among separate plants:

- Ensure seedlings are virus-free
- Improve quarantine measures
- Eliminate sources of infection (mites or other infected plants)
- Ensure proper environment for cultivation
- Work towards developing OFV-resistant plants through genetic engineering

== History ==
The earliest recorded work concerning Orchid Fleck Virus was published in Japan in 1969. OFV was reported as concentrations of short, rod-like particles in chlorotic lesions on the leaves of Cymbidium orchids.

== Human relevance ==
Orchids are extremely important to the agricultural economy of many Southeast Asian countries. For example, the Singapore orchid is Singapore's national flower. According to the Orchid Society, the world market for orchids is worth more than $1 billion with Japan and the United States leading the way in 2010. In the US in 2005 produced around $144 million worth of orchids.
