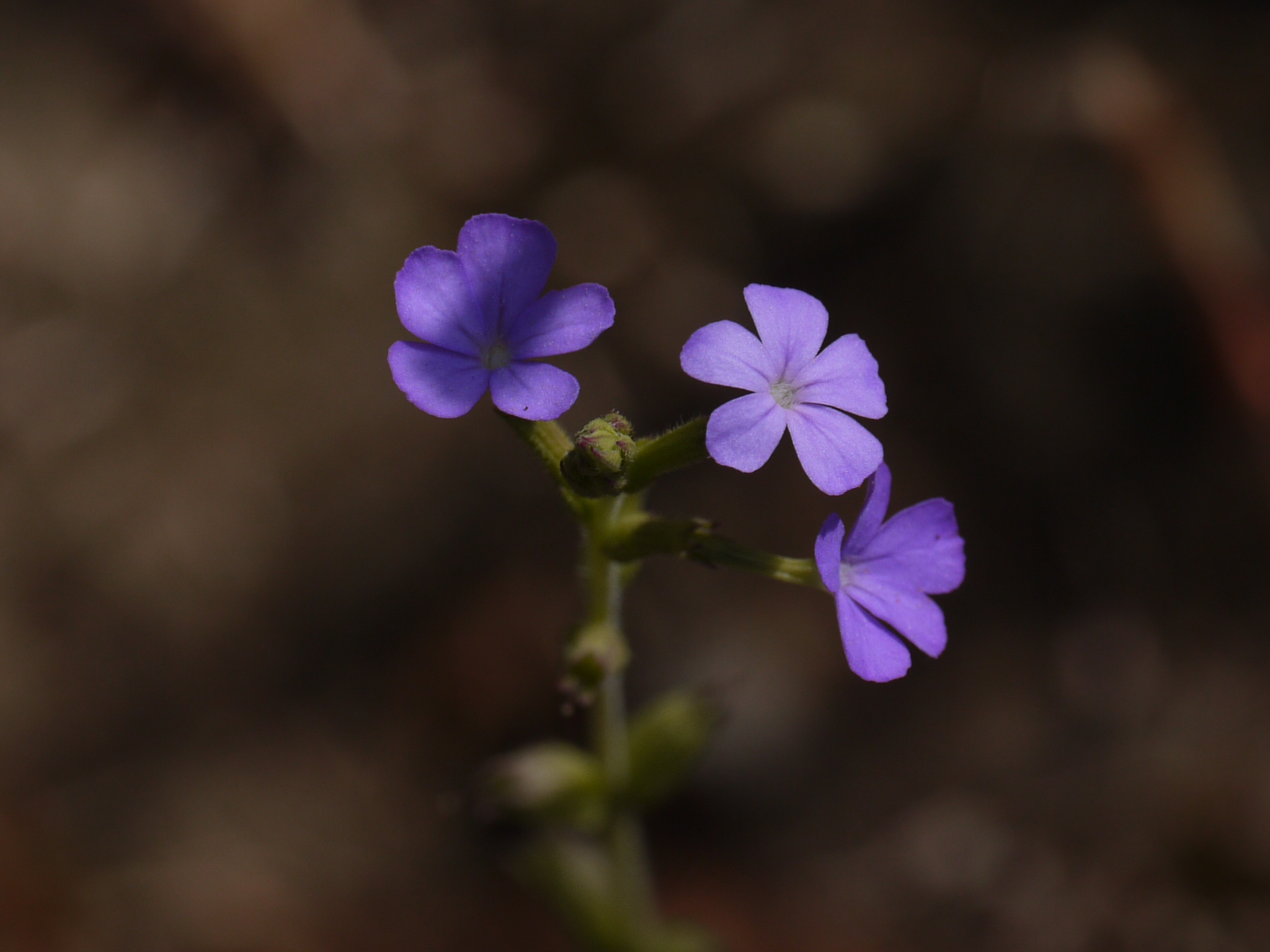
- Buchnera hispida

Scientific classification
- Kingdom: Plantae
- Clade: Tracheophytes
- Clade: Angiosperms
- Clade: Eudicots
- Clade: Asterids
- Order: Lamiales
- Family: Orobanchaceae
- Tribe: Buchnereae
- Genus: Buchnera; L.

= Buchnera (plant) =

Genus of plants

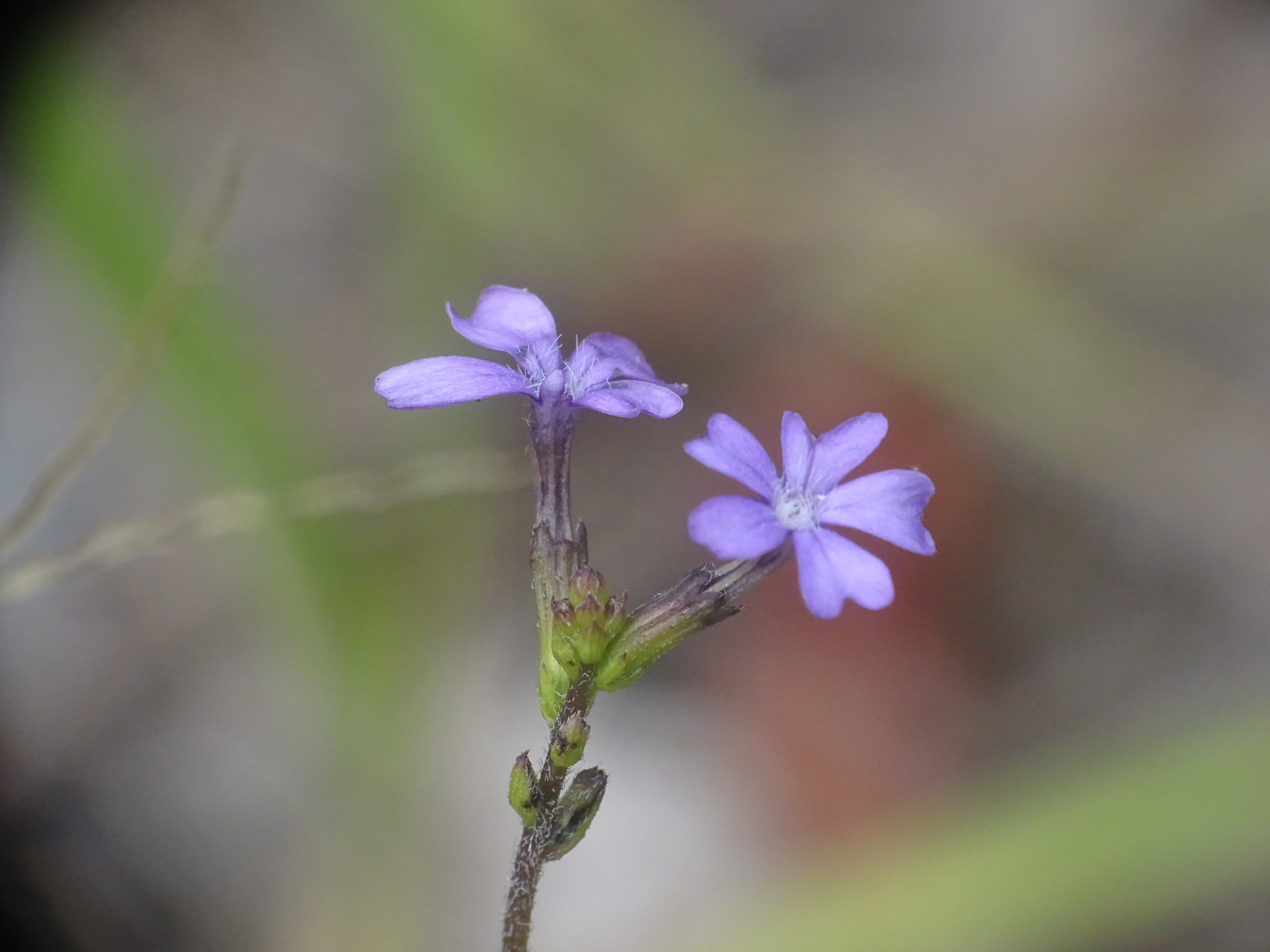
Buchnera floridana

Buchnera is a genus of flowering plants belonging to the family Orobanchaceae. Its native range is Northern and Tropical America, Tropical and Southern Africa, Madagascar, Arabian Peninsula Tropical Asia, Australia.

Species:

- Buchnera affinis De Wild.
- Buchnera albiflora Skan
- Buchnera americana L.
- Buchnera amethystina Cham. & Schltdl.
- Buchnera andongensis Hiern
- Buchnera androsacea Merxm.
- Buchnera angustissima Bonati
- Buchnera arenicola R.E.Fr.
- Buchnera asperata R.Br.
- Buchnera attenuata Skan
- Buchnera bampsiana Mielcarek
- Buchnera bangweolensis R.E.Fr.
- Buchnera baumii Engl. & Gilg
- Buchnera benthamiana Skan
- Buchnera bequaertii De Wild.
- Buchnera bowalensis A.Chev.
- Buchnera bragaana Engl.
- Buchnera buchneroides (S.Moore) Brenan
- Buchnera bukamensis De Wild.
- Buchnera cambodiana Bonati
- Buchnera candida S.Moore
- Buchnera capitata Burm.f.
- Buchnera carajasensis Scatigna & N.Mota
- Buchnera chimanimaniensis Philcox
- Buchnera chisumpae Philcox
- Buchnera ciliata Pennell
- Buchnera ciliolata Engl.
- Buchnera congoensis S.Moore
- Buchnera convallicola S.Moore
- Buchnera cruciata Buch.-Ham. ex D.Don
- Buchnera cryptocephala (Baker) Philcox
- Buchnera decandollei Govaerts
- Buchnera descampsii De Wild. & Ledoux
- Buchnera dilungensis Mielcarek
- Buchnera disticha Kunth
- Buchnera dundensis Cavaco
- Buchnera dura Benth.
- Buchnera ebracteolata Philcox
- Buchnera ensifolia Engl.
- Buchnera erinoides Jaroscz
- Buchnera exserta Fawc.
- Buchnera filicaulis O.Schwarz
- Buchnera flexuosa Philcox
- Buchnera floridana Gand.
- Buchnera foliosa Skan
- Buchnera garuensis Pilg.
- Buchnera geminiflora Philcox
- Buchnera gossweileri S.Moore
- Buchnera gracilis R.Br.
- Buchnera granitica S.Moore
- Buchnera henriquesii Engl.
- Buchnera hispida Buch.-Ham. ex D.Don
- Buchnera hockii De Wild.
- Buchnera humilis Skan
- Buchnera humpatensis Hiern
- Buchnera inflata (De Wild.) Skan
- Buchnera jacoborum Fern.Alonso
- Buchnera juncea Cham. & Schltdl.
- Buchnera kassneri S.Moore
- Buchnera keilii Mildbr.
- Buchnera kingaensis Engl.
- Buchnera lastii Engl.
- Buchnera lavandulacea Cham. & Schltdl.
- Buchnera laxiflora Philcox
- Buchnera ledermannii Pilg.
- Buchnera leptostachya Benth.
- Buchnera libenii Mielcarek
- Buchnera linearis R.Br.
- Buchnera lippioides Vatke ex Engl.
- Buchnera lisowskiana Mielcarek
- Buchnera longespicata Schinz
- Buchnera longifolia Kunth
- Buchnera lundensis Cavaco
- Buchnera metallorum P.A.Duvign. & Van Bockstal
- Buchnera minutiflora Engl.
- Buchnera multicaulis Engl.
- Buchnera namuliensis Skan
- Buchnera nervosa Philcox
- Buchnera nigricans (Benth.) Skan
- Buchnera nitida Skan
- Buchnera nuttii Skan
- Buchnera nyassica Gilli
- Buchnera obliqua Benth.
- Buchnera orgyalis S.Moore
- Buchnera pallescens Engl.
- Buchnera palustris (Aubl.) Spreng.
- Buchnera paucidentata Engl. ex Skan
- Buchnera peduncularis Brenan
- Buchnera philcoxii Mielcarek
- Buchnera poggei Engl.
- Buchnera prorepens Engl. & Gilg
- Buchnera pulcherrima R.E.Fr.
- Buchnera pusilla Kunth
- Buchnera pusilliflora S.Moore
- Buchnera quadrifaria Baker
- Buchnera quangensis Engl.
- Buchnera ramosissima R.Br.
- Buchnera randii S.Moore
- Buchnera rariflora Pennell
- Buchnera reducta Hiern
- Buchnera reissiana Büttner ex Engl.
- Buchnera remotiflora Schinz
- Buchnera retrorsa Philcox
- Buchnera robynsii Mielcarek
- Buchnera rosea Kunth
- Buchnera rubriflora P.A.Duvign. & Van Bockstal
- Buchnera rungwensis Engl.
- Buchnera ruwenzoriensis Skan
- Buchnera saigonensis Bonati
- Buchnera scabridula E.A.Bruce
- Buchnera schliebenii Melch.
- Buchnera schultesii R.Bernal
- Buchnera simplex (Thunb.) Druce
- Buchnera speciosa Skan
- Buchnera splendens Engl.
- Buchnera spruceana Philcox
- Buchnera stachytarphetoides Mildbr. & Melch.
- Buchnera strictissima Engl. & Gilg
- Buchnera subcapitata Engl.
- Buchnera subglabra Philcox
- Buchnera symoensiana Mielcarek
- Buchnera tacianae V.C.Souza
- Buchnera tenella R.Br.
- Buchnera tenuifolia Philcox
- Buchnera tenuissima Philcox
- Buchnera ternifolia Kunth
- Buchnera tetragona R.Br.
- Buchnera tetrasticha Wall. ex Benth.
- Buchnera timorensis Fawc.
- Buchnera tomentosa Blume
- Buchnera trilobata Skan
- Buchnera urticifolia R.Br.
- Buchnera usuiensis Oliv.
- Buchnera vandenberghenii Mielcarek
- Buchnera verbenoides Klotzsch
- Buchnera verdickii Skan
- Buchnera virgata Kunth
- Buchnera weberbaueri Diels
- Buchnera welwitschii Engl.
- Buchnera wildii Philcox
