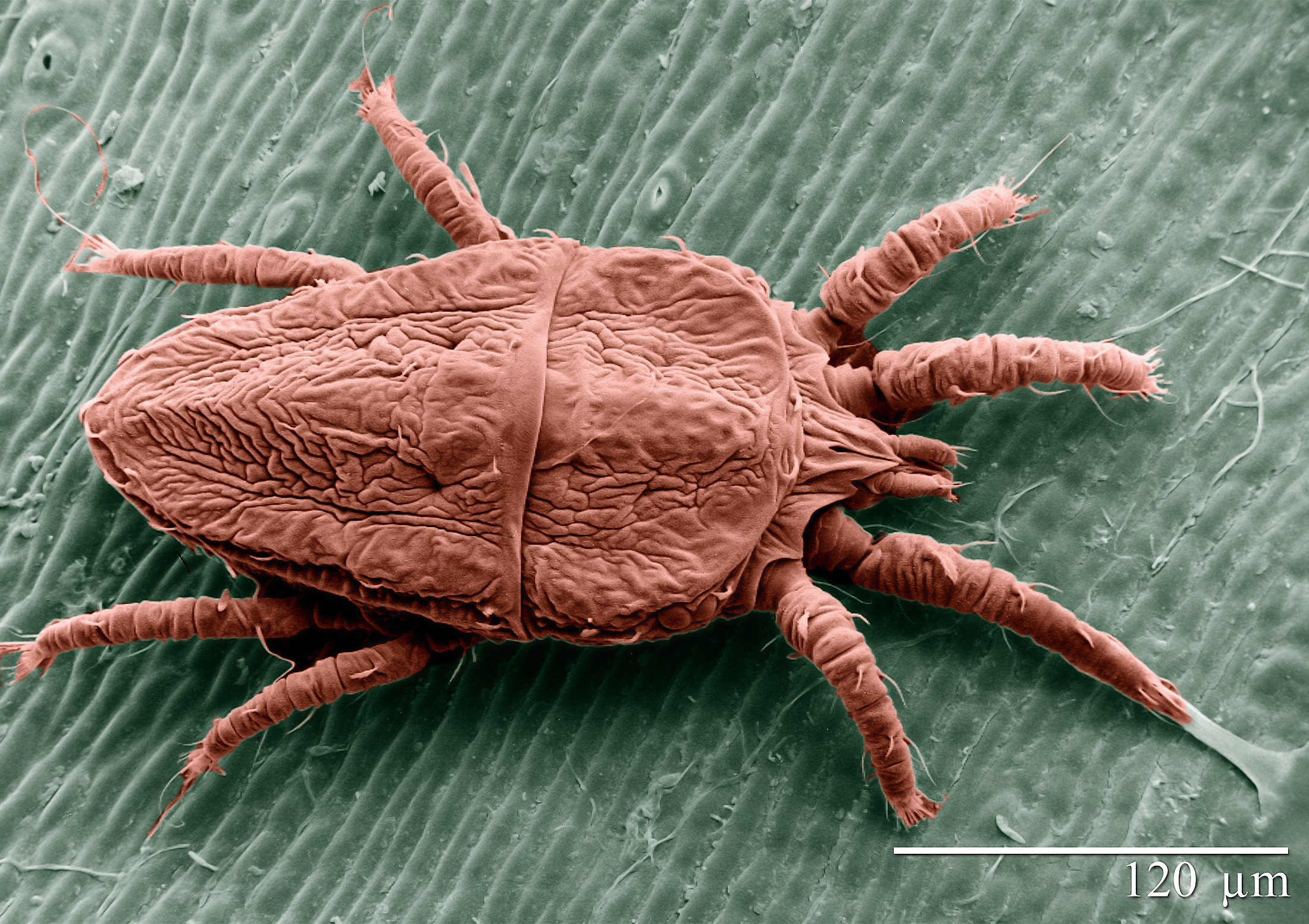

Scientific classification
- Domain: Eukaryota
- Kingdom: Animalia
- Phylum: Arthropoda
- Subphylum: Chelicerata
- Class: Arachnida
- Order: Trombidiformes
- Family: Tenuipalpidae
- Genus: Brevipalpus
- Species: B. phoenicis

Binomial name
- Brevipalpus phoenicis (Geijskes, 1936)

Synonyms
- Brevipalpus deleoni Pritchard & Baker, 1958; Brevipalpus mcbridei Baker, 1949; Brevipalpus papayensis Baker, 1949; Brevipalpus phoenicoides Gonzalez, 1975; Brevipalpus yothersi Baker, 1949; Tenuipalpus phoenicis Geijskes, 1939

= Brevipalpus phoenicis =

Species of mite

Brevipalpus phoenicis, also known as the false spider mite, red and black flat mite, and in Australia as the passionvine mite, is a species of mite in the family Tenuipalpidae. This species occurs globally, and is a serious pest to such crops as citrus, tea, papaya, guava and coffee, and can heavily damage numerous other crops. They are unique in having haploid females, a condition caused by a bacterium that change haploid males into females.

== Description ==
=== Adults ===
Adult specimens can grow to 280 μm (0.011 in) long (including the rostrum) and 150 μm (0.0059 in) wide. They are flat, oval, and have a dark green to red-orange colour. The adult males are more wedge-shaped than females. This species has two pairs of legs that extend forward and two extending back. It has two sensory rods on tarsus II that distinguish it from another mite species that is known to occur on the same plants, the privet mite, (Brevipalpus obovatus Donn.). A black, H-shaped mark occurs on females when raised in temperatures of 68 °F to 77 °F, although this marking is not present at 86 °F.

Tarsus

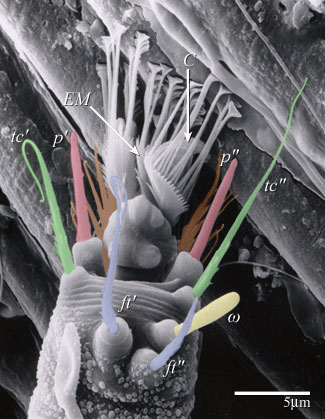

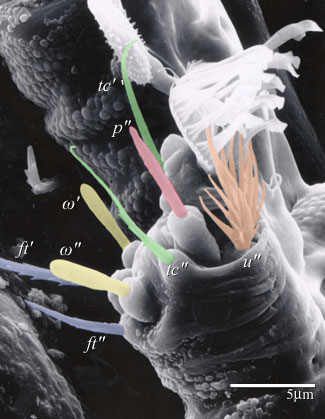
Legend: Empodium (EM) Claw (C) Leg setae-prorals (p) Tectals (tc) Festigials (ft) Unguinals (u) Solenidion (w)

=== Larvae ===
Larvae are about 140 μm (0.0055 in) long, have six legs, and are bright orange-red when newly emerged, later becoming opaque-orange. The protonymphs and deutonymphs are somewhat transparent, with some of their inner organs appearing a diffuse green colour, with black or yellow patches. Like the adults, they are eight-legged.

=== Eggs ===
Eggs can be seen with the unaided eye, as clusters of reddish-orange.

== Distribution ==
Brevipalpus phoenicis occurs globally, mostly in the tropics. It is known to occur in:

- Argentina
- Australia
- Brazil
- Guyana
- Cuba
- Egypt
- Netherlands
- India
- Jamaica
- Kenya
- Malaya
- Mauritius
- Mexico
- Spain
- Taiwan

=== United States ===
This species has become established in numerous southern states, throughout the mainland from Florida to California, and also in Hawaii.

== Life cycle ==
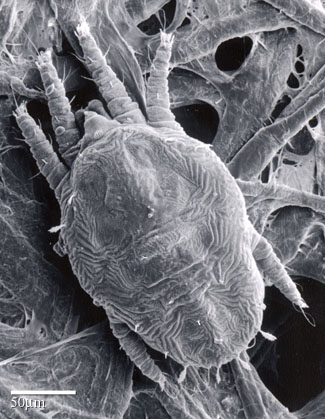
Larva

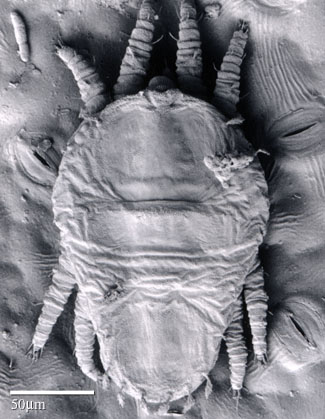
Protonymph

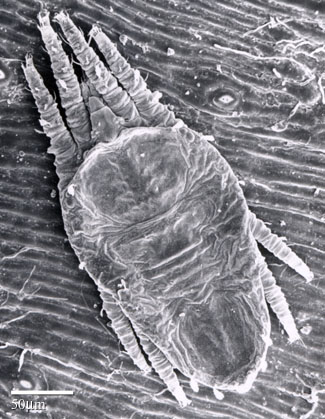
Deutonymph

Brevipalpus phoenicis lays approximately 50 to 60 eggs during adulthood. These eggs have a fragile stipe that projects from them, and may break if handled. The eggs hatch 8 to 16 days after being laid.

Females deposit eggs singly, commonly sharing a single location with other females. Usually 4 to 8 clusters of eggs are present, normally deposited in cracks or the hollow cavities in leaves created when the internal mesophyll has been destroyed. One day before the eggs hatch, they turn opaque white and the red eyes of the larvae within become visible.

In warm to temperate regions, 4 to 6 generations of this mite can occur each year. In tropical regions, at least 10 generations can occur. Ideal conditions for this species are a temperature range of 25–30 °C (77–86 °F) with high relative humidity.

Adult females live for a maximum of 5 to 6 weeks. The maximum life expectancy for this species is 47 days at 68 °F, with a minimum of 7.5 days at 86 °F in regions of relative humidity of 85% to 90%.

Populations of Brevipalpus phoenicis are almost entirely female. This is because the species is parthenogenetic, with most reproduction occurring from unfertilized eggs that produce only females. Development takes place in three stages—larva, protonymph, and deutonymph. The maturation from egg to adult occurs during 12 to 24 days.

=== Moulting ===
This mite experiences a quiescent period prior to each moulting, during which it does not eat. During this time it remains attached to the host plant by its stylet alone, with its legs held straight.

== Hosts ==
This species is known to have at least 65 hosts, and the USDA reports that there may be up to 1,000. In the state of Florida, this mite is known to infest Aphelandra, gardenia, grapefruit, hibiscus, holly, ligustrum, lemon, lime, orange, pecan and viburnum.

== Damage ==
This species damages fruit by injecting the cells with toxic saliva. They do this to be able to digest the contents. They puncture numerous cells in close proximity to one another, causing visible chlorotic spots around the area. Later, these spots merge to become brown patches. This can stop the plant's growth and result in deformations. This may cause the skin of the fruit to rupture, and shoots to lose leaves and occasionally die back.

On papaya, the mites begin by feeding on the trunk of the tree. As the population becomes more dense, they migrate to the leaves and fruit. Characteristic evidence of feeding sites is drying of the surrounding areas, with brown colour appearing and the area becoming callous and suberized.

Damage to citrus is more severe. When cholorotic spots are great in number, production of the host plants may be severely reduced. Characteristic galls at the nodes may be observed, and the buds may be unable to sprout. Shoots may be grossly misshapen, and very few leaves may develop. This can result in the death of the entire tree.

Apart from the physical damage this species can cause, it is also a vector of both Citrus leprosis disease and the coffee ringspot virus.

== Control ==
Early in the 20th century, Florida farmers used sulfur as a way to control this pest. However, this is toxic to other, beneficial arthropods.

There are at least four natural predators of this species, but are generally not useful economically, as they attack Brevipalpus phoenicis only after the population has increased to very high numbers and severe crop damage has already been done.

Currently, as there is no alternative available, pesticides are used.

== See also ==
- Invasive species
- Parasite
