= Dichorhavirus =

Virus classification
- (unranked): Virus
- Realm: Riboviria
- Kingdom: Orthornavirae
- Phylum: Negarnaviricota
- Class: Monjiviricetes
- Order: Mononegavirales
- Family: Rhabdoviridae
- Subfamily: Betarhabdovirinae
- Genus: Dichorhavirus

Genus of viruses

Dichorhavirus is a genus of negative sense, single-stranded RNA viruses of plants within the family Rhabdoviridae. Dichorhaviruses have segmented genomes and their short bacilliform virions are not enveloped. Dichorhaviruses are transmitted by mites.

== Taxonomy ==
The genus contains the following species, listed by scientific name and followed by the exemplar virus of the species:

- Dichorhavirus australis, Citrus bright spot virus
- Dichorhavirus chilense, Vinca chlorotic spot virus
- Dichorhavirus citri, Citrus chlorotic spot virus
- Dichorhavirus clerodendri, clerodendrum chlorotic spot virus
- Dichorhavirus coffeae, Coffee ringspot virus
- Dichorhavirus leprosis, Citrus leprosis virus N
- Dichorhavirus orchidaceae, Orchid fleck virus
- Dichorhavirus piracicabense, Clerodendrum leaf spot virus
