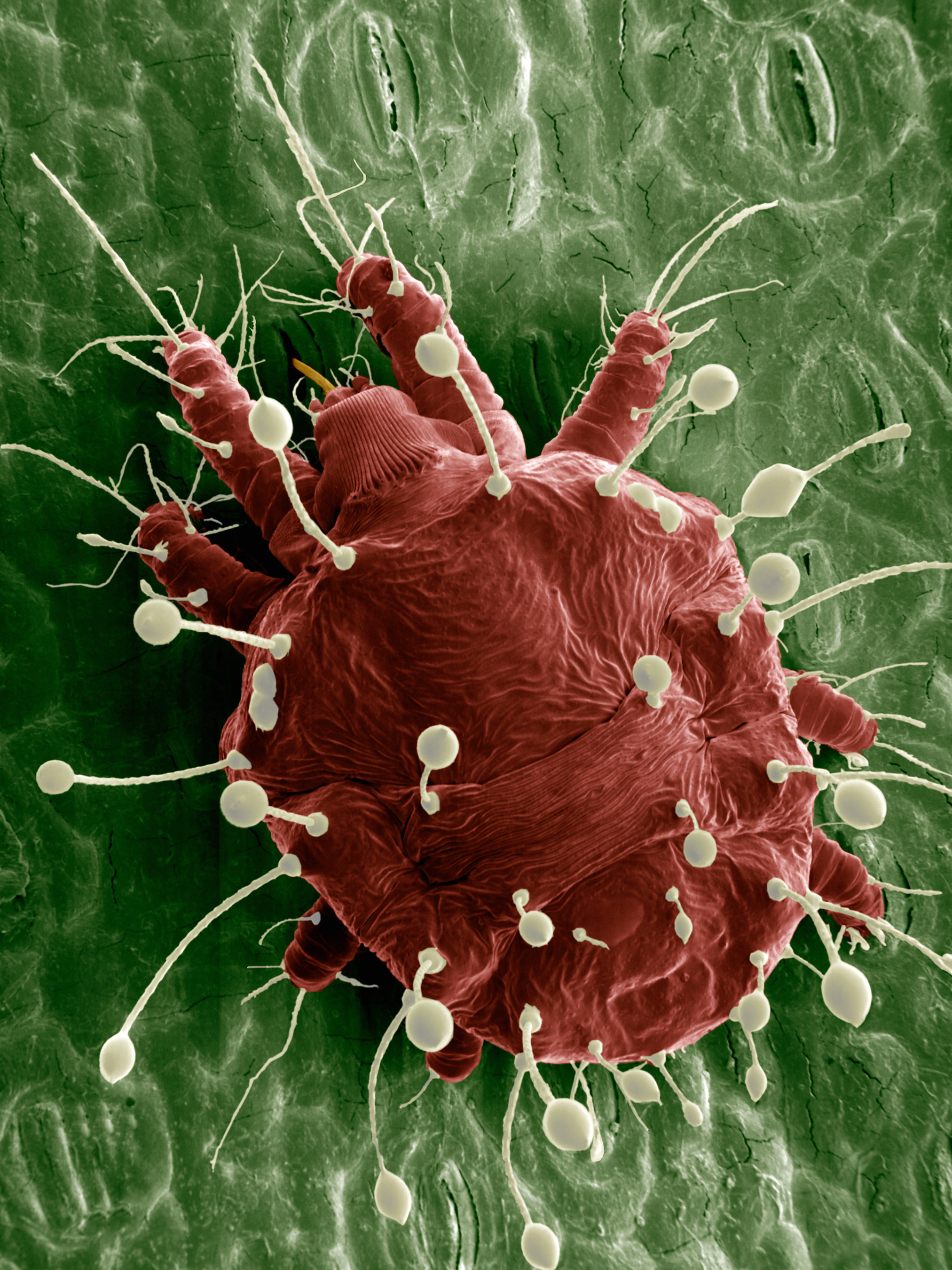
- Raoiella indica, an SEM image with false color

Scientific classification
- Kingdom: Animalia
- Phylum: Arthropoda
- Subphylum: Chelicerata
- Class: Arachnida
- Order: Trombidiformes
- Family: Tenuipalpidae
- Genus: Raoiella; Hirst, 1924

Type species
- Raoiella indica Hirst, 1924

= Raoiella =

Genus of mites

Raoiella is a genus of mite belonging to the family Tenuipalpidae.

== Behaviour ==
Raoiella mites are herbivorous and feed on plants from various families. They feed by inserting their stylets through plant stomata, thus bypassing the plant's mechanical defenses.

== Species ==
- Raoiella indica Hirst, 1924, the red palm mite
- Raoiella australica Womersley, 1940
- Raoiella macfarlanei Pritchard & Baker, 1958
- Raoiella pandanae Mohanasundaram, 1989 (Tamil-Nadu)
- Raoiella phoenica Smith-Meyer, 1979 (Sudan)
- Raoiella shimapana Smith-Meyer, 1979 (Transvaal)
