= Cyperacarus =

Scientific classification
- Kingdom: Animalia
- Phylum: Arthropoda
- Subphylum: Chelicerata
- Class: Arachnida
- Order: Trombidiformes
- Family: Tenuipalpidae
- Genus: Cyperacarus; Beard & Ochoa, 2011

Genus of mites

Cyperacarus is a genus of flat mites in the family Tenuipalpidae, containing the following species:

- Cyperacarus foliatus Beard & Ochoa, 2011
- Cyperacarus naomae Beard & Ochoa, 2011
