= Gert Potgieter (tenor) =

- Born: Gerhardus Petrus Potgieter; 14 November 1929
- Origin: South Africa
- Died: 2 July 1977 (aged 47)
- Genres: Light music Opera
- Occupation: Opera singer
- Years active: 1960–1977
- Label: Gallo

Gerhardus Petrus "Gert" Potgieter (14 November 1929 – 2 July 1977) was a South African opera tenor who had a great influence on Afrikaans culture.

== Early life ==
Born at Aasvoëlkop, a suburb of Johannesburg, on 14 November 1929, he was one of the five children of Hermanus Potgieter, a printer, and his wife Maria Naudé.

He was educated at the Laërskool (Primary School) Louw Geldenhuys and Helpmekaar Kollege, Johannesburg, where he matriculated.

After leaving school he worked at Voortrekkerpers af:Voortrekkerpers, a publishing firm, in Johannesburg until 1960 when he qualified as a printer.

== Singing career ==
From the age of sixteen he took singing lessons with Kosie Boshoff and, after his voice had broken, with Beatrice Lovegrove and Alberto Terassi. When PJ Lemmer, Inspector of Music in the Orange Free State, wanted to stage a performance of the cantata Vasco da Gama in 1949; he chose Potgieter for the tenor role. This was the beginning of his singing career.

Andre Brink and Anton Hartman, head of music at the South African Broadcasting Corporation and the principal conductor of the SABC orchestra (and thus the most influential conductor in the country) gave Potgieter the opportunity of taking part in radio broadcasts and in 1960 he sang with Mimi Coertse and George Fourie in Verdi's opera, Rigoletto. In the same year he was awarded the Mimi Coertse Scholarship for singing. Towards the end of 1960 he enrolled as a student at the Vienna Opera School and took part inter alia in a performance of Gluck's Iphigénie en Tauride.

On his return to South Africa in 1962, he went back to the printing industry as a proof-reader and machine compositor. From 1966, he devoted himself to full-time singing.

He soon became known as a singer of light music and a tenor in operas. His popularity was confirmed by the several Sarie Awards he received for his records. Sarie Awards are made by the South African Recording Industry.

His greatest operatic success was in the leading role in Peter Grimes, an opera by Benjamin Britten . He also sang arias from Don Giovanni by Mozart, Cavalleria Rusticana by Mascagni, La Boheme by Puccini and from the Afrikaans opera In die Droogte by John Joubert.

His repertoire also included extracts from the oratorios of Handel and Mendelssohn, Britten's War Requiem, and the radiophonic opera Asterion by the Dutch composer Henk Badings based on the lyrics of NP van Wyk Louw .

His powerful physique and acting ability earned him film contracts. During 1969-70 he played the leading role in the film Lied in My Hart (Song in my Heart). In Forgotten Song of Summer only his acting was used. Various recordings of his singing are available commercially and the South African Broadcasting Corporation made a number of transcription recordings.

== Family life ==
He married Mona Dreyer of Boshof, Orange Free State, in 1952. The marriage was childless.

== Death ==
He died on 2 July 1977 in a motorcar accident at Tarlton, Transvaal.

His sudden death was a great shock to his many fans. He had a friendly and charming disposition. His death left a void, particularly in the Afrikaans music world. Shortly before he died a programme about him, entitled PG Gesels Met was broadcast on the Afrikaans service of the SABC.
