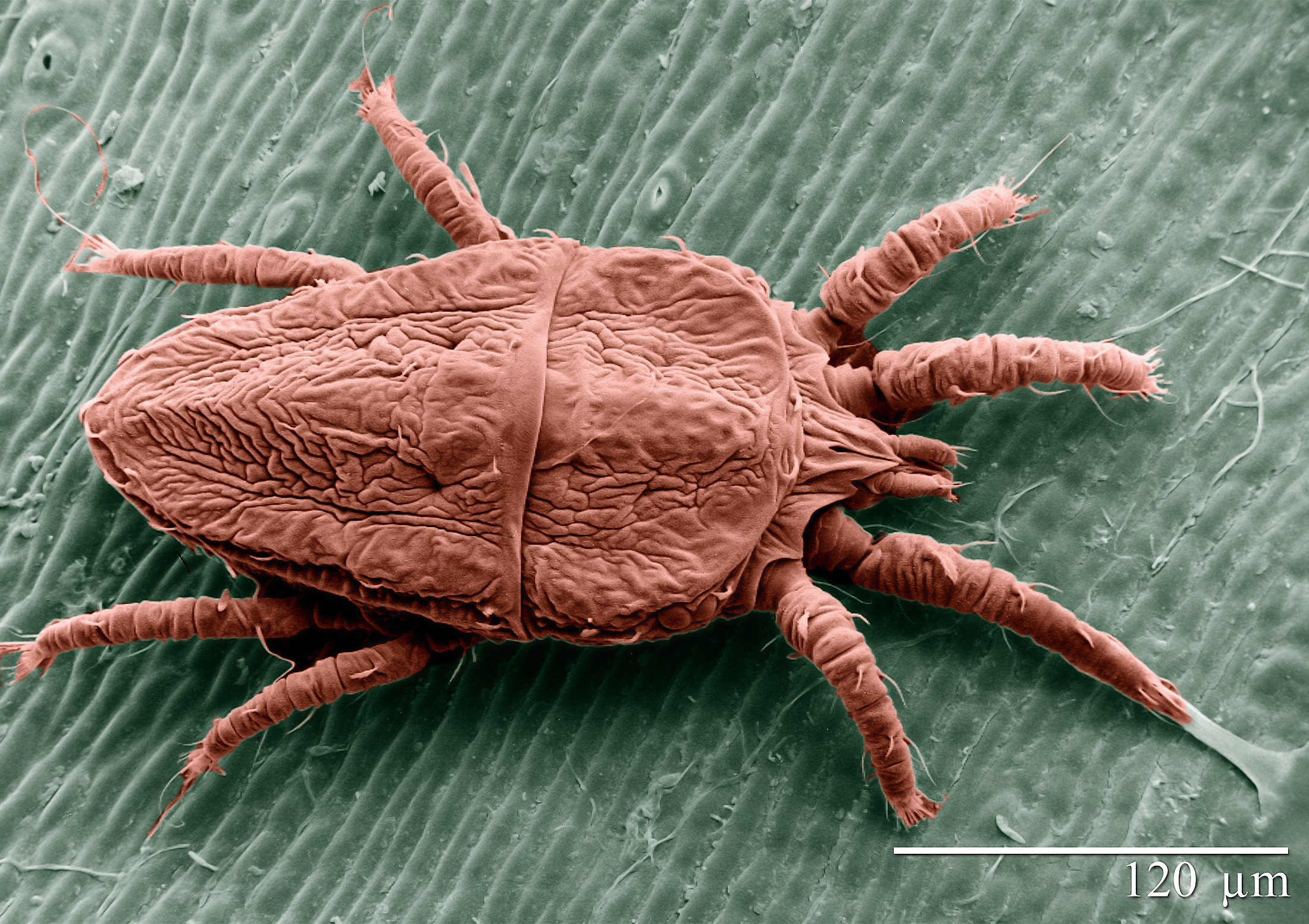
- Brevipalpus phoenicis

Scientific classification
- Kingdom: Animalia
- Phylum: Arthropoda
- Subphylum: Chelicerata
- Class: Arachnida
- Order: Trombidiformes
- Family: Tenuipalpidae
- Genus: Brevipalpus; Donnadieu, 1875

Synonyms
- Amissus Chaudri, Akbar & Rasool, 1974; Brachypalpus Mitrofanov, 1973; Flexipalpus Oudemans, 1938; Hystripalpus Mitrofanov, 1973; Pritchardipalpus Mitrofanov, 1973; Tauripalpoides Pegazzano, 1975; Tauripalpus Livshits & Mitrofanov, 1973

= Brevipalpus =

Genus of mites

Brevipalpus is a genus of mites in the family Tenuipalpidae, the flat mites. The genus includes several species that are among the most important economic pests in the flat mite family.

Some Brevipalpus species are made up mostly of female individuals that reproduce via thelytoky, producing offspring without fertilization. Male individuals occur but often become feminized by Cardinium bacteria that colonize their bodies.

Between each developmental stage, the juvenile rests as a chrysalis on a plant. Brevipalpus mites damage their host plants by inserting their relatively long mouthparts into the plant tissue and injecting saliva during feeding. The saliva is toxic to the plant. Damage on grapefruit, for example, takes the form of circular, discolored lesions on the fruit which darken as they become necrotic. On pistachio, Brevipalpus damage appears as scabby blotches on the leaf petioles, stems, and nuts. Furthermore, several of these mites are vectors for a variety of serious plant viruses.

Familiar species include:

- Brevipalpus californicus, a mite known as a vector for the orchid fleck virus, which causes spots and rings on orchid leaves. The mite has a wide range of host plants. It has been known to form galls on bitter orange.
- Brevipalpus chilensis, which is native to Chile, but has the potential to invade other regions as an agricultural pest of several crops, including grapes and citrus.
- Brevipalpus lewisi, which is known from the Palearctic realm, Australia, and the southwestern United States. It is a pest on pistachio, citrus, pomegranate, walnuts, grapes, and ornamental plants.
- Brevipalpus obovatus, which is a pest of many plants, including the ornamentals Hibiscus rosa-sinensis and Brunfelsia uniflora.
- Brevipalpus phoenicis, a pest of the tea plant, especially in Indonesia. It feeds on the leaves and in large numbers can reduce yields. It has also been observed on tangerine. This mite is a vector for Cilevirus, a plant virus that causes the disease citrus leprosis. Manifestations of the disease on a citrus tree include chlorotic lesions, girdling, fruit drop, defoliation, and the death of the tree. Of the major types of citrus, the orange is most vulnerable to the virus. The mite is also a vector of passion fruit green spot virus and coffee ringspot virus, and ringspots of Cestrum and Solanum plants.
