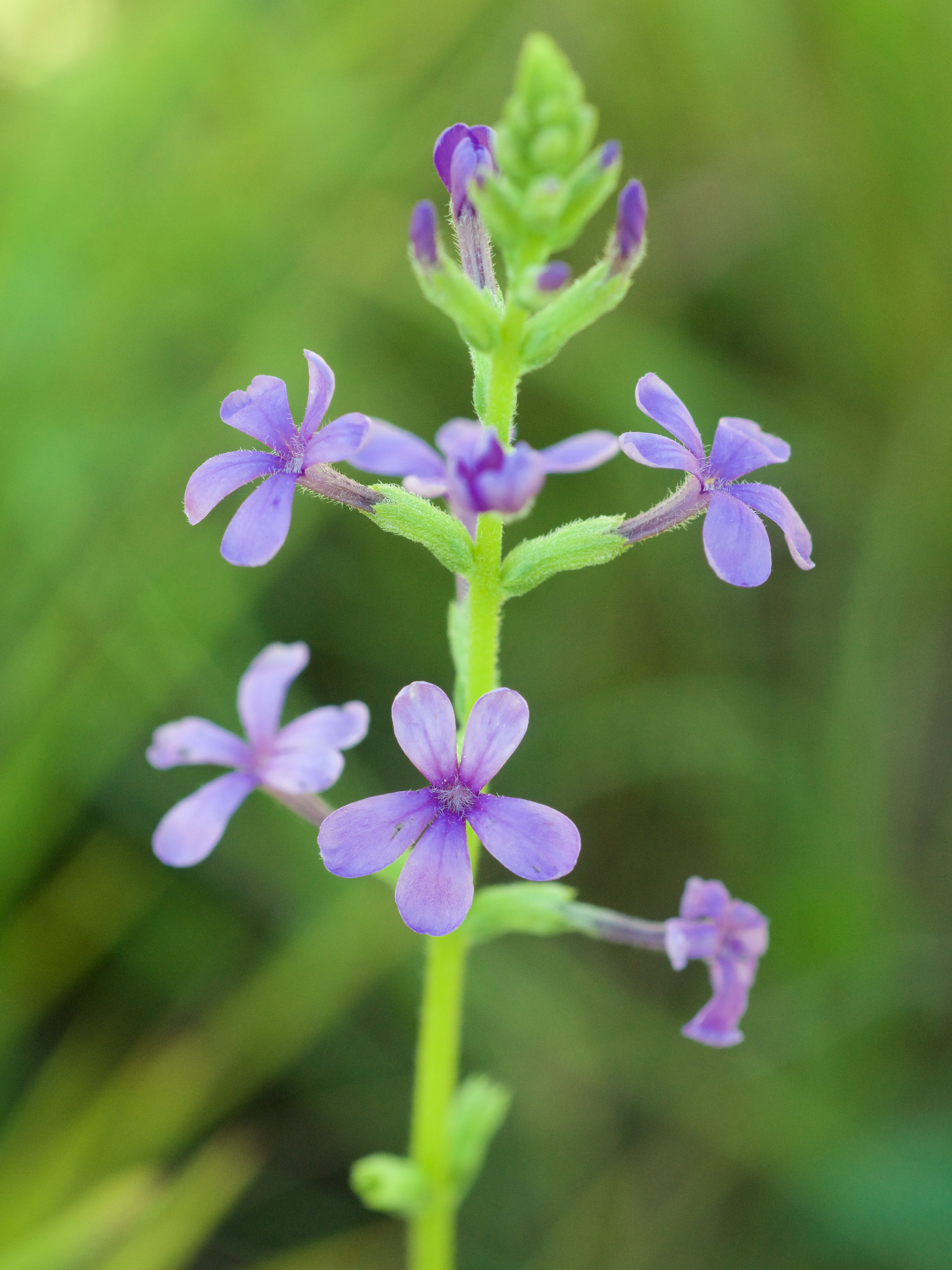

Conservation status
- Apparently Secure (NatureServe)

Scientific classification
- Kingdom: Plantae
- Clade: Tracheophytes
- Clade: Angiosperms
- Clade: Eudicots
- Clade: Asterids
- Order: Lamiales
- Family: Orobanchaceae
- Genus: Buchnera
- Species: B. americana

Binomial name
- Buchnera americana L.

= Buchnera americana =

Species of flowering plant

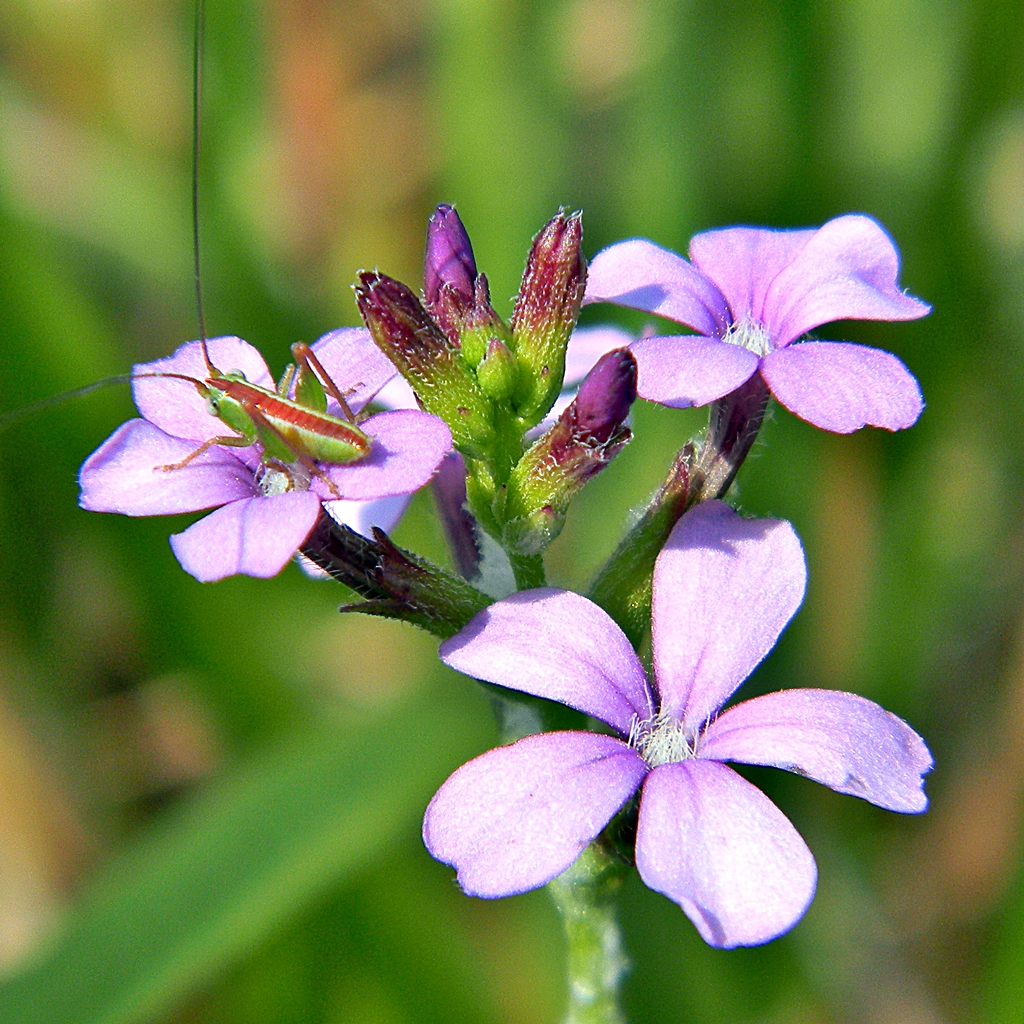
Buchnera americana

Buchnera americana, commonly known as American bluehearts or bupleurum, is a locally endangered herbaceous perennial plant of the broomrape family Orobanchaceae. Found widely across the eastern United States, it also occurs in one location in the Canadian province of Ontario.

== Description ==
Buchnera americana is a perennial flowering plant with underground rhizomes and an above-ground stem. The stem of the plant is usually covered with trichomes (small hair-like projections), and can grow 40 to 80 cm (16 to 31 in) tall. The leaves are opposed, meaning that they grow in pairs, sprouting directly across from each other. The bilaterally symmetrical flowers are purple or white, featuring five petals that form a narrow tube and then suddenly bend outward at right angles. The fruits are dark purple and form in capsules 7 mm (0.28 in) in length. The plant blooms year round, but the flowers are at their peak between June and September. During the remaining months of the year, the petals darken and dry up.

== Distribution and habitat ==
Bluehearts are found in 12 states, ranging from Ohio to Florida. They are most common in Missouri and Tennessee, where they are abundant in moist environments. The plant also occurs in a small area of south-western Ontario 10 km (6.2 mi) from Lake Huron.

Buchnera americana is mostly found along the edges of wet depressions, in limestone glades, prairies, moist sandy soils, and open woods. It sometimes forms a hemiparasitic relationship with a tree (any of several species) by attaching itself to the root system.

== Conservation ==
In Canada, Buchnera americana is only found in "a 10 km (6.2 mi) stretch of the shoreline of Lake Huron in South-western Ontario". Only six populations exist, and they are considered Endangered provincially and nationally.

In the United States, bluehearts are found in 11 states, from Ohio and Indiana to Georgia and Missouri. They are state ranked from S1 to S5 according to their degree of occurrence: S1 is extremely rare and S5 is secure. In Georgia and parts of Virginia bluehearts are listed as S1; they are listed as S2 in Ohio, Illinois and Kentucky and parts of Virginia; they are listed as S3 in Tennessee; they are listed as S4 in Alabama, Kansas and Missouri.

In Ontario their natural interdunal habitats are threatened by development for housing, cottages and recreational areas, such as parks where the flowers are stepped on or picked. In the United States, bluehearts live in prairie habitats, where fire is a necessary disturbance for seed germination and growth of other plants. Since burning needs to occur in a rotational 3–4 year cycle in Indiana, Illinois, Missouri and Ohio, bluehearts are greatly affected by habitat loss in these areas of the United States.

== Ecology ==
Bluehearts are hemiparasitic, meaning they are able to grow independently without a host but grow more strongly with a host. They attach to their host plant by parasitic roots called haustoria. During stressful conditions (such as drought), bluehearts may heighten their parasitic effects to the point where a large group of them may damage small trees. Common host trees of bluehearts are white oak (Quercus alba), eastern white pine (Pinus strobus), green ash (Fraxinus pennsylvanica), and cottonwood (Populus deltoides). Caterpillars of the common buckeye (Junonia coenia) feed on the blueheart.

Bluehearts grow in a range of soil types, from clay soils, to acidic sandy soils, dry sandy loam, moist black sandy peat, and seasonally damp areas. They prefer open, sunny conditions

== Uses ==
Buchnera americana has no known medicinal uses. In the garden, this plant is highly attractive to bees, butterflies, and birds.
