= Cilevirus =

Virus classification
- (unranked): Virus
- Realm: Riboviria
- Kingdom: Orthornavirae
- Phylum: Kitrinoviricota
- Class: Alsuviricetes
- Order: Martellivirales
- Family: Kitaviridae
- Genus: Cilevirus

Genus of viruses

Cilevirus is a genus of viruses in the family Kitaviridae. Plants serve as natural hosts. The genus contains eight species.

== Structure ==
Viruses in Cilevirus are non-enveloped, with bacilliform geometries. These viruses are about 50 nm wide and 150 nm long. Genomes are linear and segmented, bipartite, around 28.75kb in length. The genome is bipartite with two segments of 8745 nucleotide (RNA 1) and 4986 nucleotides (RNA 2) in length. The 5' terminals of both segments have a cap structure and have poly adenosine tails in their 3'-terminals. RNA 1 contains two open reading frames (ORFs) which encode 286 and 29 kilodalton (kDa) proteins. The 286 kDa protein is a polyprotein involved in virus replication and has four conserved domains: methyltransferase, protease, helicase and an RNA dependent RNA polymerase. RNA 2 encodes four ORFs which correspond to 15, 61, 32 and 24 kDa proteins. The 32 kDa protein is involved in cell to cell movement of the virus but the functions of the other proteins are unknown.

Genus	Structure	Symmetry	Capsid	Genomic arrangement	Genomic segmentation
Cilevirus	Bacilliform		Non-enveloped	Linear	Bipartite

== Life cycle ==
Viral replication is cytoplasmic. Entry into the host cell is achieved by penetration into the host cell. Replication follows the positive stranded RNA virus replication model. Positive stranded rna virus transcription is the method of transcription. The virus exits the host cell by tubule-guided viral movement. Plants serve as the natural host. The virus is transmitted via a vector (mites of the genus brevipalpus). Transmission routes are vector.

Genus	Host details	Tissue tropism	Entry details	Release details	Replication site	Assembly site	Transmission
Cilevirus	Plants	None	Penetration	Viral Movement	Cytoplasm	Cytoplasm	Vector

== Taxonomy ==
The genus contains the following species, listed by scientific name and followed by the exemplar virus of the species:

- Cilevirus australis, Ligustrum leprosis virus
- Cilevirus colombiaense, Citrus leprosis virus C2
- Cilevirus leprosis, Citrus leprosis virus C
- Cilevirus ligustri, Ligustrum chlorotic spot virus
- Cilevirus oahuense, Hibiscus yellow blotch virus
- Cilevirus passiflorae, Passion fruit green spot virus
- Cilevirus pistaciae, Pistachio virus Y
- Cilevirus solani, Solanun violifolium ringspot virus

== History ==
This genus was created in 2006 by Locali-Fabris et al in 2006.
