= Louise Prinsloo =

South African author

- Born: July 4, 1946 (age 80); Johannesburg, South Africa
- Occupation: Author

Louise Prinsloo (born 4 July 1946 is a South African author and radio scriptwriter.

== Education ==
Louise Prinsloo was born on 4 July 1946, Johannesburg and matriculated in 1964 at Helpmekaar Hoër Meisieskool. She received a Teacher's Diploma in 1965 at the Pretoria College of Education and a licentiate in Drama in 1974 at the Drama Academy of the late Aletta Gericke.

== Career ==
She has read books for children and women on Afrikaans Radio programmes and played several roles in Afrikaans Radio Youth dramas. Her written work includes a children's series for Radio Pulpit, a drama for adults for Radio Pulpit, TV scripts for children's programmes (SABC 1 and SABC 3), and radio dramas for the SABC. Louise founded the Laerskool Lynnwood Young Writer's Association in 1994.

Her first children's book, Lizette en die Silwer Beker appeared in 1983 and was the first of three books in the Lizette series.

Miempie (Miemie, English translation) was published in 1990 and tells the story of a little girl living near Table Mountain in Cape Town.

Her most popular work includes the Gedaantes en Geraamtes ghost story series about three friends and their adventures. The series consists of ten books, and have since been published in omnibus form. The first book in the series, Geheim van Groukatlaagte, won the ATKV prize for children's literature.

== Personal life ==
She lives in Pretoria and is married to Daan Prinsloo. They have three daughters. Louise works as an administrative secretary at Laerskool Lynnwood in Pretoria.
