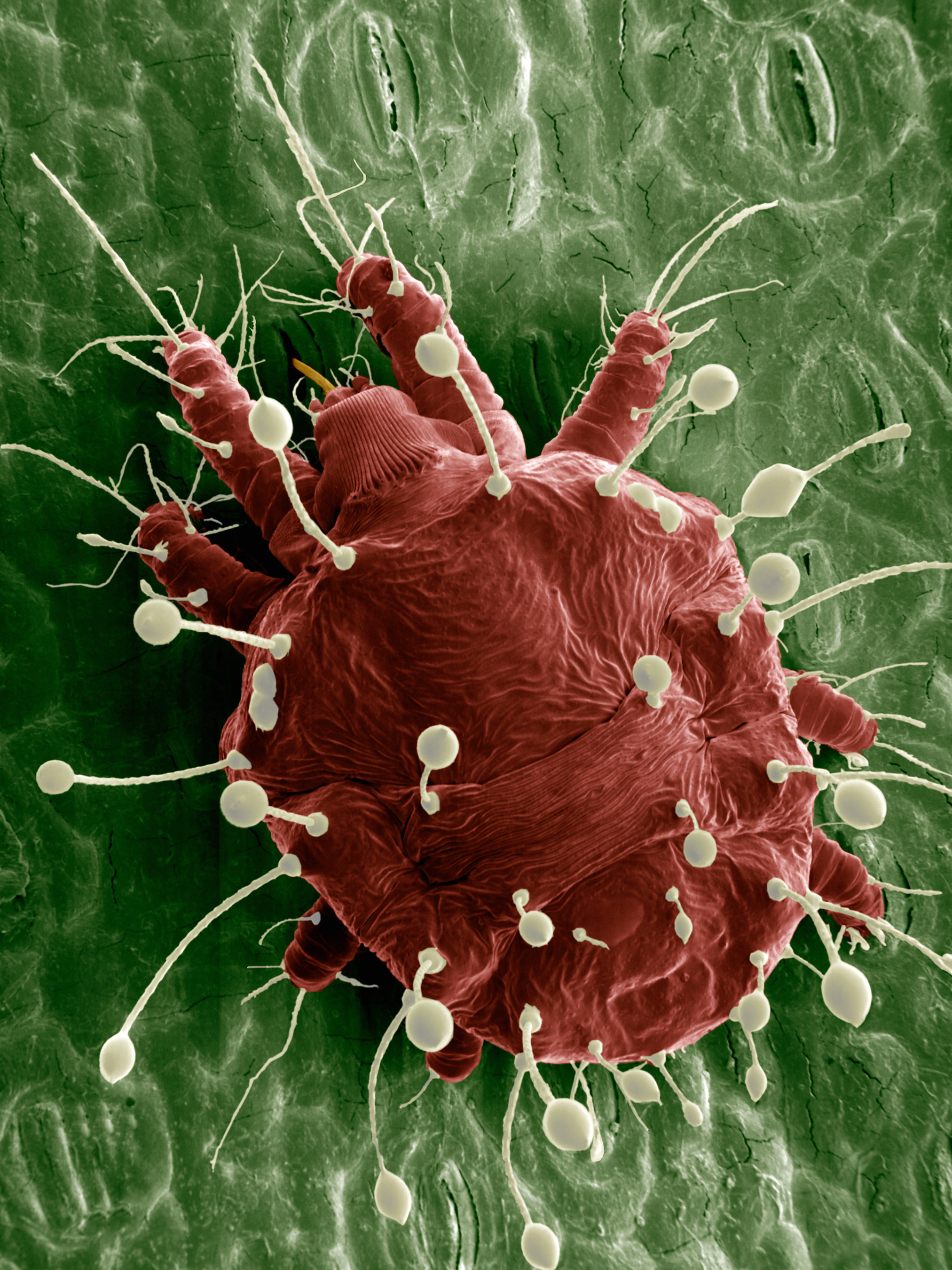
- Raoiella indica, an SEM image with false color

Scientific classification
- Kingdom: Animalia
- Phylum: Arthropoda
- Subphylum: Chelicerata
- Class: Arachnida
- Order: Trombidiformes
- Suborder: Prostigmata
- Infraorder: Eleutherengona
- Superfamily: Tetranychoidea
- Family: Tenuipalpidae; Berlese, 1913

Diversity
- > 30 genera, > 780 species

= Tenuipalpidae =

Family of mites

Tenuipalpidae, also called flat mites or false spider mites, are a family of mites, closely related to the Tetranychidae. They are reddish and slow-moving and normally feed near the midrib or veins on the underside of leaves. Several species, among them Raoiella indica, are important crop pests. Other common species include Acaricis urigersoni and the Brevipalpus species B. phoenicis, B. californicus, B. obovatus, and B. lewisi.

== Genera ==
The family includes the following genera:

- Acaricis Beard and Gerson, 2009
- Aegyptobia Sayed, 1950
- Afronychus M. K. P. Smith-Meyer, 1979
- Amblypalpus Mitrofanov & Strunkova, 1978
- Australopalpus Smiley & Gerson, 1995
- Brevipalpus Donnadieu, 1875
- Capedulia M. K. P. Smith-Meyer, 1979
- Cenopalpus Pritchard & Baker, 1958
- Chaudhripalpus Mesa, Welbourn & Evans, 2009
- Coleacarus M. K. P. Smith-Meyer, 1979
- Crossipalpus Smiley, Frost & Gerson, 1996
- Cyperacarus Beard & Ochoa, 2011
- Dolichotetranychus Sayed, 1938
- Gahniacarus Beard & Ochoa, 2011
- Krugeria M. K. P. Smith-Meyer, 1979
- Larvacarus Baker & Pritchard, 1952
- Lisaepalpus Smiley & Gerson, 1995
- Macfarlaniella Baker & Pritchard, 1962
- Magdalenapalpus Mesa, Welbourn & Evans, 2009
- Meyeraepalpus Smiley, Frost & Gerson, 1996
- Obdulia Pritchard & Baker, 1958
- Obuloides Baker & Tuttle, 1975
- Palpipalpus Beard & Seeman, 2014
- Pentamerismus McGregor, 1949
- Philippipalpus Corpuz-Raros, 1978
- Phyllotetranychus Sayed, 1938
- Phytoptipalpus Trägårdh, 1904
- Priscapalpus de Leon, 1961
- Prolixus Beard, Fan & Walter, xxxx
- Pseudoleptus Bruyant, 1911
- Raoiella Hirst, 1924
- Raoiellana Baker & Tuttle, 1972
- Tegopalpus Womersley, 1940
- Tenuilichus M. Mohanasundaram, 1988
- Tenuipalpus Donnadieu, 1875
- Terminalichus Anwarullah & Khan, 1974
- Ultratenuipalpus Mitrofanov, 1973
- Urigersonus Mesa, Ochoa & Evans, 2009
