= T. elegans =

T. elegans may refer to:

- Tenuipalpus elegans, a mite species
- Thalasseus elegans, the elegant tern, a seabird species found on the Pacific coasts of the southern United States and Mexico and winters south to Peru, Ecuador and Chile
- Theocolax elegans, a parasitoid wasp species
- Tibouchina elegans, an ornamental plant species native to Brazil
- Tritoniopsis elegans, synonym: Tritonia elegans, a marine dendronotid nudibranch species
- Tutelina elegans, a jumping spider
- Tynanthus elegans, a flowering plant species
- Typhlops elegans, a snake species found on the island of Príncipe, São Tomé and Príncipe

== Synonyms ==
- Thyca elegans, a synonym for Capulus elegans, a sea snail species
- Trimeresurus elegans, a synonym for Protobothrops elegans, a venomous pitviper species found in Japan
