= T. similis =

T. similis may refer to:

- Tabanus similis, a biting horsefly species in the genus Tabanus
- Tarachodes similis, a praying mantis species
- Trialeurodes similis, a whitefly species
- Trichopsomyia similis, a hoverfly species in the genus Trichopsomyia
- Troglohyphantes similis, the Kočevje subterranean spider, a spider species endemic to Slovenia
- Tutelina similis, a jumping spider species in the genus Tutelina
