= Thiodina nicoleti =

Scientific classification
- Kingdom: Animalia
- Phylum: Arthropoda
- Subphylum: Chelicerata
- Class: Arachnida
- Order: Araneae
- Infraorder: Araneomorphae
- Family: Salticidae
- Genus: Thiodina
- Species: T. nicoleti

Binomial name
- Thiodina nicoleti Roewer, 1951 (replacement name)

Synonyms
- Attus elegans Nicolet, 1849; invalid, preoccupied by Hentz, 1846; Thiodina elegans (Nicolet, 1849); invalid

Species of spider

Thiodina nicoleti is a species of spider in the family Salticidae, found in Chile. The species was first described by Hercule Nicolet in 1849, as Attus elegans. Eugène Simon transferred it to the genus Thiodina in 1901 using this specific name. However, it was later discovered that Nicholas Hentz had previously described a different species as Attus elegans (now Tutelina elegans), and in 1951 Carl Friedrich Roewer published the replacement name Thiodina nicoleti.
