= Parathiodina =

Scientific classification
- Kingdom: Animalia
- Phylum: Arthropoda
- Subphylum: Chelicerata
- Class: Arachnida
- Order: Araneae
- Infraorder: Araneomorphae
- Family: Salticidae
- Genus: Parathiodina; Bryant, 1943
- Species: P. compta

Binomial name
- Parathiodina compta Bryant, 1943

Genus of spiders

Parathiodina is a monotypic genus of jumping spiders containing the single species, Parathiodina compta. It was first described by E. B. Bryant in 1943, and is only found on Hispaniola. The name is a combination of the Ancient Greek "para" (παρά), meaning "alongside", and the salticid genus Thiodina.
