= Bignonia elegans =

Bignonia elegans may refer to:

- Bignonia elegans Cham., a synonym for Tynanthus elegans
- Bignonia elegans Vell., a synonym for Fridericia elegans
