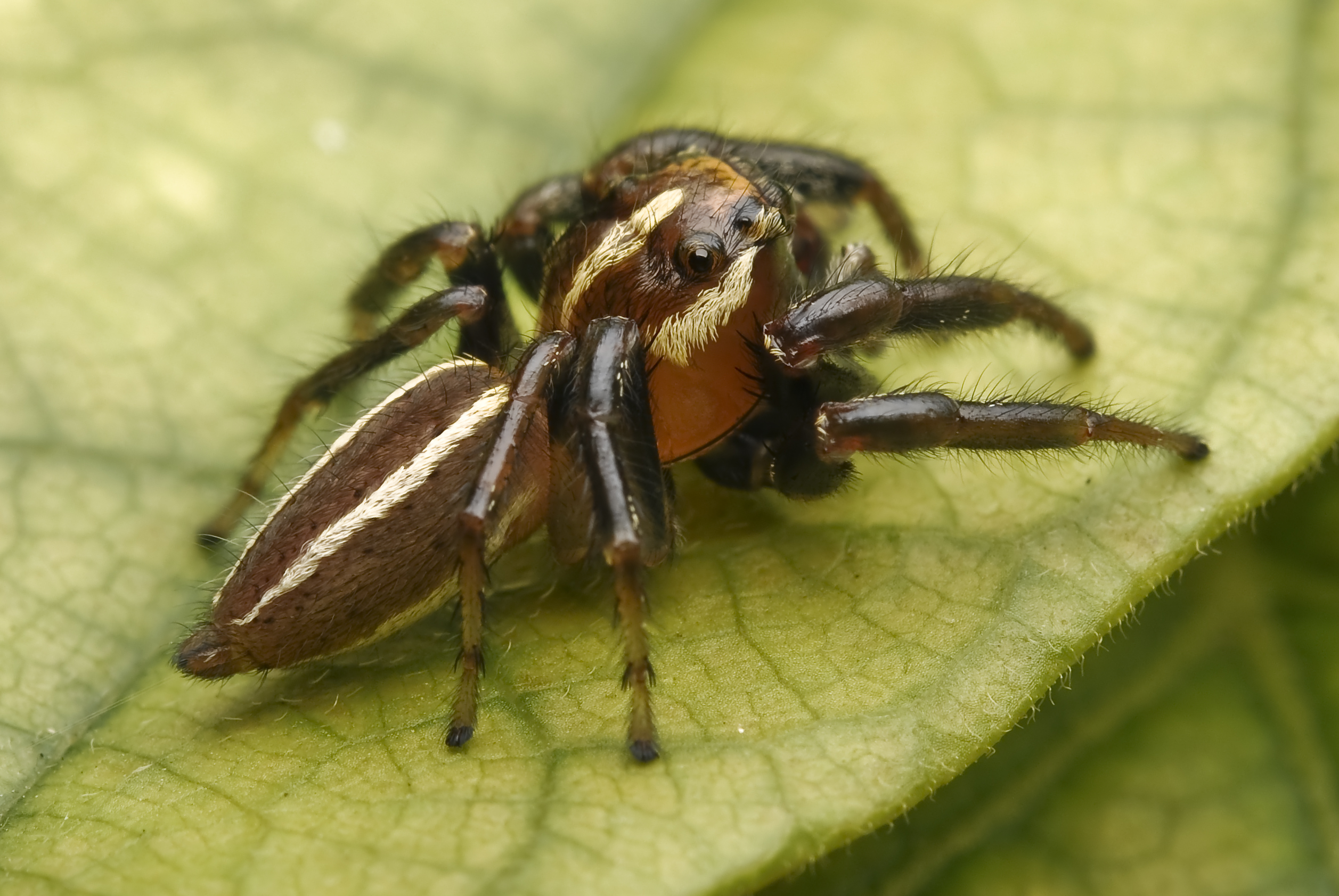
- Male
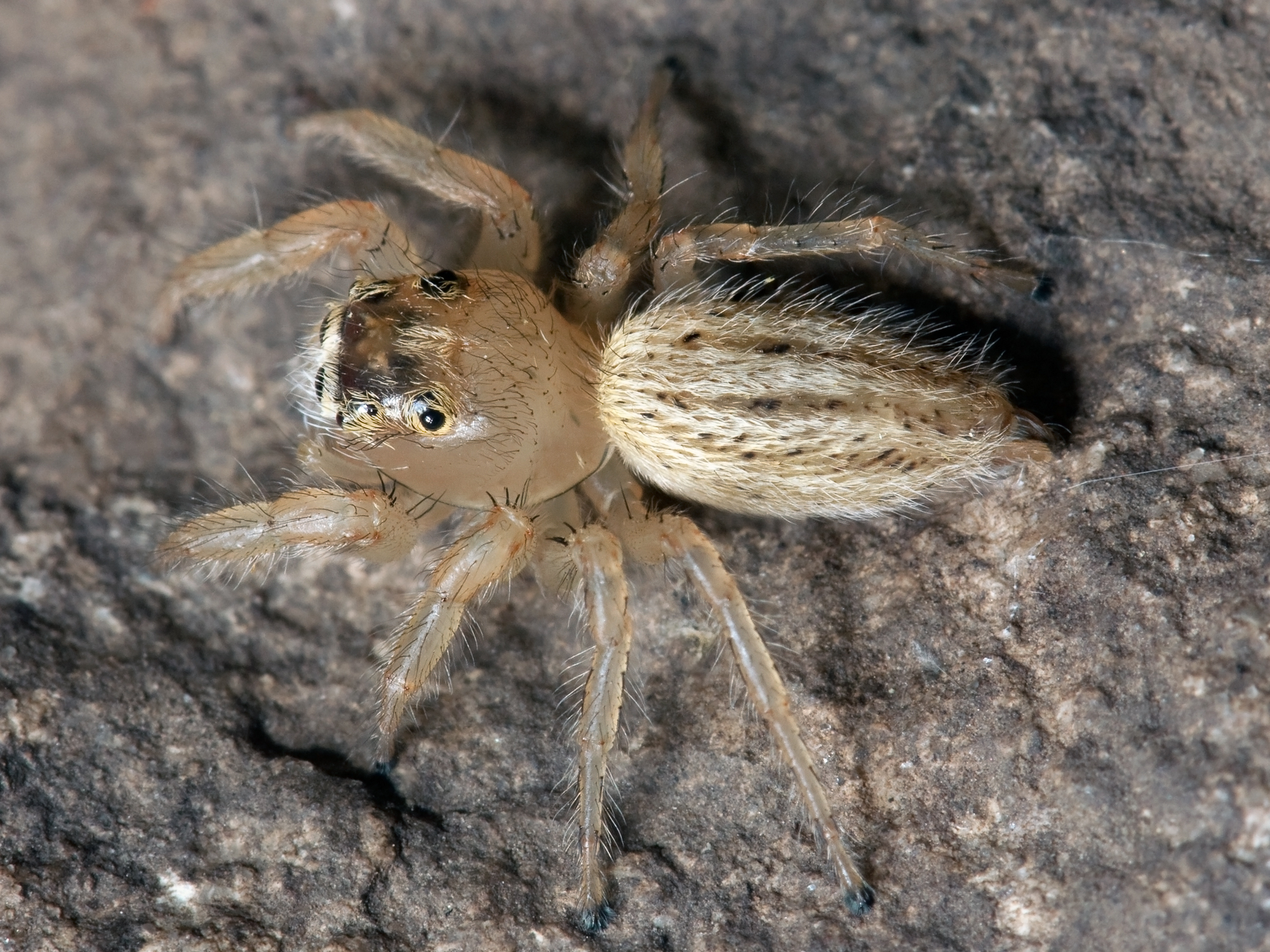
- Female

Scientific classification
- Kingdom: Animalia
- Phylum: Arthropoda
- Subphylum: Chelicerata
- Class: Arachnida
- Order: Araneae
- Infraorder: Araneomorphae
- Family: Salticidae
- Genus: Colonus
- Species: C. puerperus

Binomial name
- Colonus puerperus (Hentz, 1846)

Synonyms
- Attus puerperus Hentz, 1846; Thiodina puerpera Peckham & Peckham, 1909

= Colonus puerperus =

Species of spider

Colonus puerperus is a species of jumping spider found in the eastern United States and Mexico. Its range stretches along the Gulf Coast from Florida to Texas, and north to Kansas, Illinois, and Pennsylvania. It has also been found in northern Mexico. It is usually found in grassy areas during the warmer months of the year. Adult females are between 7 and 11 mm (0.3–0.4 in) in length. Adult males are between 5 and 7 mm (0.2–0.3 in).

The species name is from Latin puerperus, "just having born a child" (from puer, child, and pario, give birth).

This species is among the furthest jumping, if not the furthest jumping, species of jumping spiders. The maximum horizontal jump distance of a 6.2 mm male was measured at 23 cm, meaning that C. puerperus is capable of jumping up to 38 times its body length.
