= Theocolax elegans =

Scientific classification
- Domain: Eukaryota
- Kingdom: Animalia
- Phylum: Arthropoda
- Class: Insecta
- Order: Hymenoptera
- Family: Cerocephalidae
- Genus: Theocolax
- Species: T. elegans

Binomial name
- Theocolax elegans (Westwood, 1874)

Synonyms
- Choetospila elegans Westwood, 1874

Species of wasp

Theocolax elegans is a parasitic wasp species in the genus Theocolax. It is a parasite of immature stages of stored grain pest insects such as Sitophilus granarius or Rhyzopertha dominica
