= Tutelina formicaria =

Scientific classification
- Kingdom: Animalia
- Phylum: Arthropoda
- Subphylum: Chelicerata
- Class: Arachnida
- Order: Araneae
- Infraorder: Araneomorphae
- Family: Salticidae
- Genus: Tutelina
- Species: T. formicaria

Binomial name
- Tutelina formicaria (Emerton, 1891)

Species of spider

Tutelina formicaria is a species of jumping spider in the family Salticidae. It is found in the United States. It was first described by James Henry Emerton in 1891.
