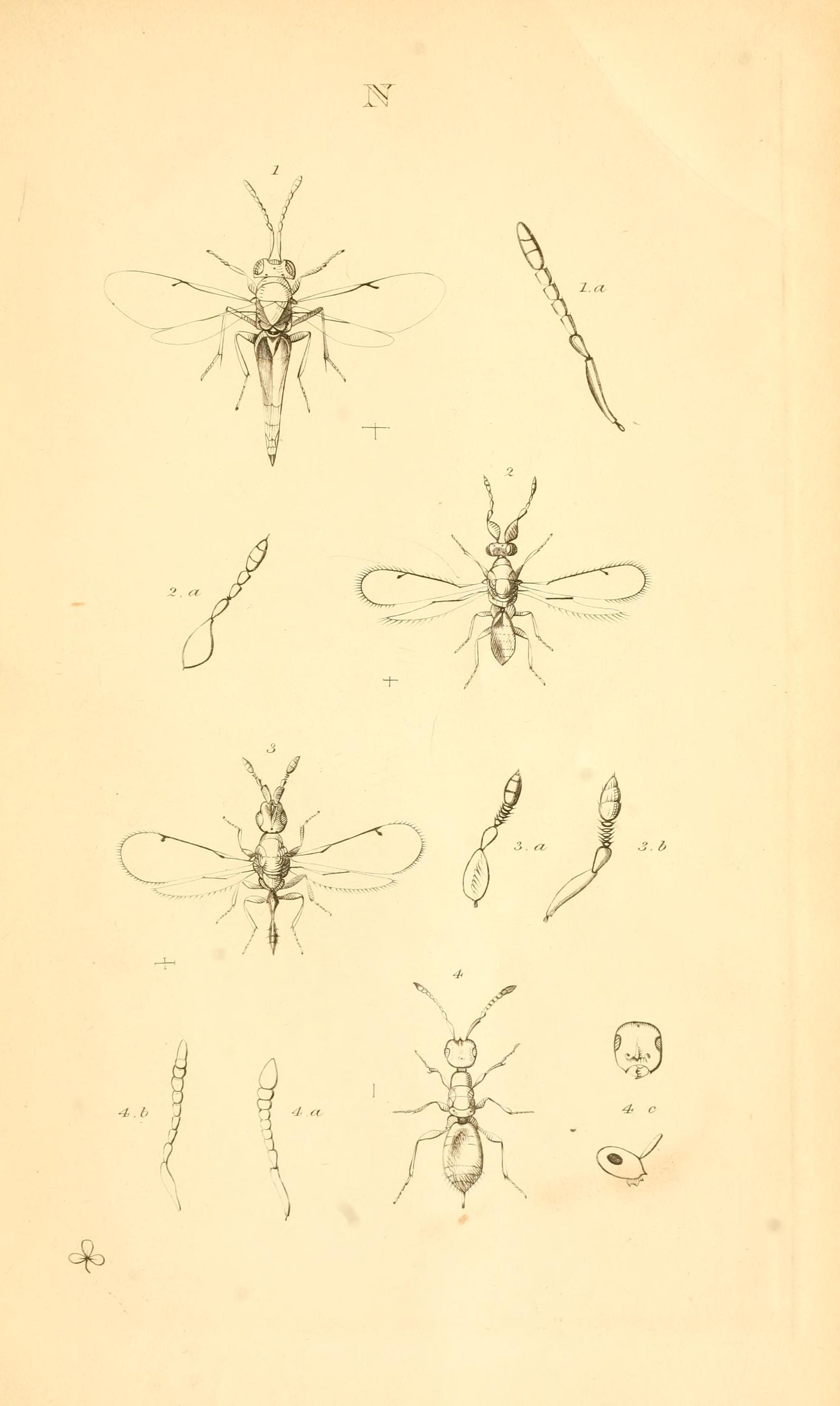
- 4. Cerocephala formiciformis Entomol. Mag. 2 149 a Antenna b male c head (Cerocephala formiciformis (Westwood, 1832) Synonym of Theocolax formiciformis Westwood, 1832)

Scientific classification
- Domain: Eukaryota
- Kingdom: Animalia
- Phylum: Arthropoda
- Class: Insecta
- Order: Hymenoptera
- Family: Cerocephalidae
- Genus: Theocolax; Westwood, 1832

Synonyms
- Laesthia Haliday, 1833; Choetospila Westwood, 1874; Spalangiomorpha Girault, 1913

= Theocolax =

Genus of wasps

Theocolax is a parasitic wasp genus in the family Cerocephalidae.

== Species list ==
- Theocolax americanus McEwen 2015
- Theocolax bakeri (Crawford, 1915)
- Theocolax elegans (Westwood, 1874)
- Theocolax formiciformis (Westwood, 1832)
- Theocolax frater (Girault, 1913)
- Theocolax ingens Xiao & Huang, 2001
- Theocolax oblongus (Delucchi 1956)
- Theocolax phloeosini Yang, 1989
- Theocolax radhakrishnani Sureshan & Narendran, 2005
