= Tynanthus polyanthus =

Scientific classification
- Kingdom: Plantae
- Clade: Embryophytes
- Clade: Tracheophytes
- Clade: Spermatophytes
- Clade: Angiosperms
- Clade: Eudicots
- Clade: Asterids
- Order: Lamiales
- Family: Bignoniaceae
- Genus: Tynanthus
- Species: T. polyanthus

Binomial name
- Tynanthus polyanthus (Bureau ex Baill.) Sandwith

Synonyms
- Bignonia caryophyllea Bello; Bignonia laxiflora Poepp. ex Bureau & K.Schum.; Bignonia myriantha Poepp. ex Bureau & K.Schum. nom. illeg.; Schizopsis polyantha Bureau ex Baill.; Tynanthus caryophylleus (Bello) Alain; Tynanthus laxiflorus Miers; Tynanthus myrianthus Bureau & K.Schum.

Species of flowering plant

Tynanthus polyanthus, the bejuco de clavo is a flowering plant species in the genus Tynanthus.
