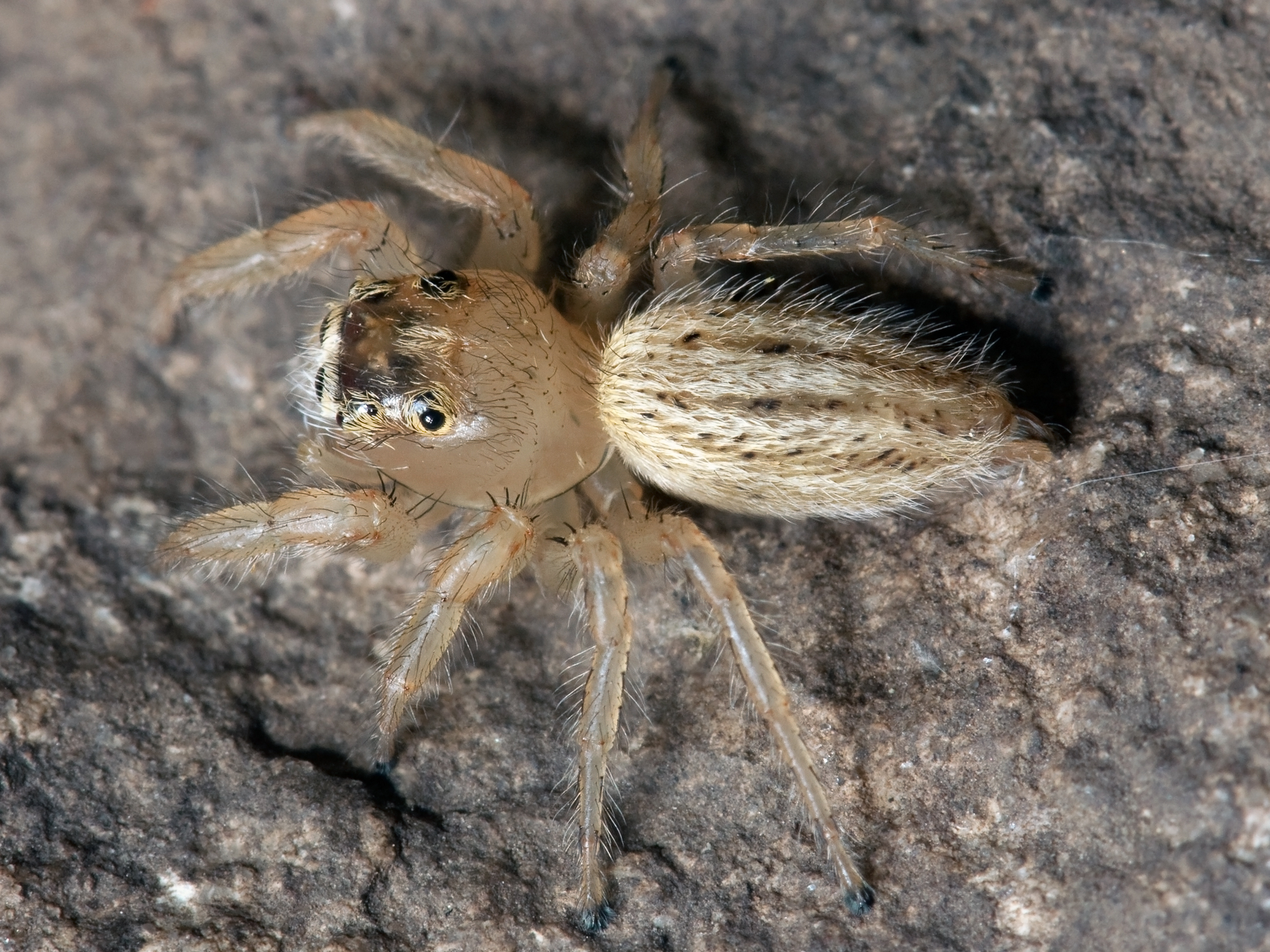
- Female Colonus puerperus

Scientific classification
- Kingdom: Animalia
- Phylum: Arthropoda
- Subphylum: Chelicerata
- Class: Arachnida
- Order: Araneae
- Infraorder: Araneomorphae
- Family: Salticidae
- Subfamily: Salticinae
- Genus: Colonus; F.O.P.-Cambridge, 1901

Type species
- Attus sylvanus Hentz, 1846

Species
- See text.

Diversity
- 14 species

= Colonus (spider) =

Genus of spiders

Colonus is a genus of spiders in the jumping spider family, Salticidae. Colonus species are endemic to North and South America, ranging from New York to Argentina. All members of the genus have two pairs of bulbous spines on the ventral side of the first tibiae. The function of these spines is unknown. Colonus was declared a junior synonym of Thiodina by Eugène Simon in 1903, but this was reversed by Bustamante, Maddison, and Ruiz in 2015.

== Species ==
As of November 2015, the World Spider Catalog accepted 14 species of Colonus:

- Colonus branicki (Taczanowski, 1871) – Venezuela, Guyana, French Guiana
- Colonus candidus (Mello-Leitão, 1922) – Brazil
- Colonus germaini (Simon, 1900) – Brazil, Argentina
- Colonus hesperus (Richman & Vetter, 2004) – southwestern United States, Mexico
- Colonus melanogaster (Mello-Leitão, 1917) – Brazil
- Colonus pallidus (C. L. Koch, 1846) – Colombia to Argentina
- Colonus pseustes (Chamberlin & Ivie, 1936) – Panama, French Guiana
- Colonus puerperus (Hentz, 1846) – eastern United States, Mexico
- Colonus punctulatus (Mello-Leitão, 1917) – Brazil
- Colonus rishwani (Makhan, 2006) – Suriname
- Colonus robustus (Mello-Leitão, 1945) – Argentina
- Colonus sylvanus (Hentz, 1846) – United States to Panama
- Colonus vaccula (Simon, 1900) – Peru, Brazil
- Colonus vellardi (Soares & Camargo, 1948) – Brazil
