= Tynanthus guatemalensis =

Scientific classification
- Kingdom: Plantae
- Clade: Tracheophytes
- Clade: Angiosperms
- Clade: Eudicots
- Clade: Asterids
- Order: Lamiales
- Family: Bignoniaceae
- Genus: Tynanthus
- Species: T. guatemalensis

Binomial name
- Tynanthus guatemalensis Donn.Sm.

Species of flowering plant

Tynanthus guatemalensis, commonly known as chib' iyal (Q'eqchi Maya) or ch'ajá xuu' (Yucatec Maya), is a flowering plant species in the genus Tynanthus. It contains the chemical eugenol, the chemical responsible for the cinnamon aroma in the cinnamon plant. However, T. guatemalensis is not closely related to the cinnamon plant.

== Distribution ==
Tynanthus guatemalensis is a tropical plant found in Belize, Guatemala, and Mexico.

== Uses ==
=== Tea ===
Tynanthus guatemalensis is popular as a tea with the Maya.

=== Medicine ===
Tynanthus guatemalensis is used as a thirst remedy and an antidiabetic remedy among the Mayans; thirst is a symptom highly associated with diabetes. The plant is also reputed to reduce the effects of hyperglycemia in diabetic patients.

=== Building material ===
The xylem in the stem of Tynanthus guatemalensis makes it a strong material, often used for ropes and scaffolding by the Maya.
