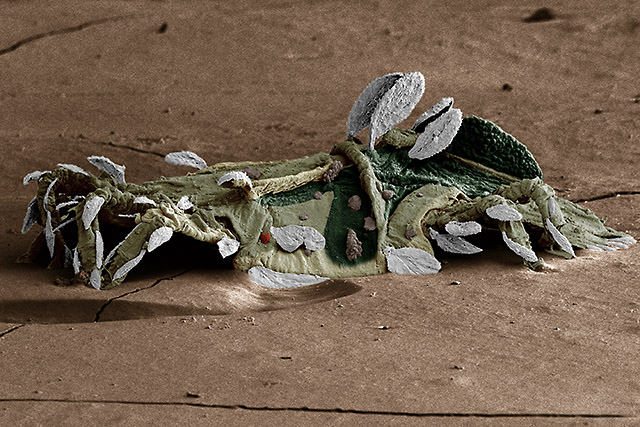
- Electromicrograph of Tenuipalpus spinosaurus

Scientific classification
- Domain: Eukaryota
- Kingdom: Animalia
- Phylum: Arthropoda
- Subphylum: Chelicerata
- Class: Arachnida
- Order: Trombidiformes
- Family: Tenuipalpidae
- Genus: Tenuipalpus; Donnadieu, 1875

Synonyms
- Colopalpus

= Tenuipalpus =

Genus of mites

Tenuipalpus is genus of mites in the family Tenuipalpidae, containing the following species:

- Tenuipalpus aboharensis
- Tenuipalpus abutiloni
- Tenuipalpus acaciae
- Tenuipalpus acacii
- Tenuipalpus acritus
- Tenuipalpus acuminatae
- Tenuipalpus aethiopicus
- Tenuipalpus africanus
- Tenuipalpus albae
- Tenuipalpus alpinus
- Tenuipalpus amatikulensis
- Tenuipalpus amygdalusae
- Tenuipalpus anacardii
- Tenuipalpus angolensis
- Tenuipalpus annonae
- Tenuipalpus anoplomexus
- Tenuipalpus anoplus
- Tenuipalpus antipodus
- Tenuipalpus arbuti
- Tenuipalpus argus
- Tenuipalpus ariauae
- Tenuipalpus athrixiae
- Tenuipalpus attiahi
- Tenuipalpus aurantiacus
- Tenuipalpus auriculatae
- Tenuipalpus austrocedri
- Tenuipalpus baeri
- Tenuipalpus bagdadensis
- Tenuipalpus bakerdeleonorum
- Tenuipalpus bakeri
- Tenuipalpus banahawensis
- Tenuipalpus banksiae
- Tenuipalpus barticanus
- Tenuipalpus bassiae
- Tenuipalpus bellulus
- Tenuipalpus berkheyae
- Tenuipalpus boninensis
- Tenuipalpus boyani
- Tenuipalpus bucidae
- Tenuipalpus burserae
- Tenuipalpus calcarius
- Tenuipalpus caledonicus
- Tenuipalpus capassae
- Tenuipalpus capparis
- Tenuipalpus carlosflechtmanni
- Tenuipalpus carolinensis
- Tenuipalpus caudatus
- Tenuipalpus cedrelae
- Tenuipalpus celtidis
- Tenuipalpus chamaedorea
- Tenuipalpus cheladzeae
- Tenuipalpus chelinus
- Tenuipalpus chiclorum
- Tenuipalpus chinariensis
- Tenuipalpus chiococcae
- Tenuipalpus cissampelosa
- Tenuipalpus citus
- Tenuipalpus clematidos
- Tenuipalpus coccolobicoloides
- Tenuipalpus coccolobicolus
- Tenuipalpus coimbatorensis
- Tenuipalpus comatus
- Tenuipalpus combreti
- Tenuipalpus comptus
- Tenuipalpus costarricensis
- Tenuipalpus couroupita
- Tenuipalpus coyacus
- Tenuipalpus crassulus
- Tenuipalpus crassus
- Tenuipalpus crescentiae
- Tenuipalpus crocopontensis
- Tenuipalpus cupressoides
- Tenuipalpus cyatheae
- Tenuipalpus daneshvari
- Tenuipalpus danxianensis
- Tenuipalpus dasples
- Tenuipalpus decus
- Tenuipalpus dimensus
- Tenuipalpus disparilis
- Tenuipalpus dombeyae
- Tenuipalpus dominguensis
- Tenuipalpus dubinini
- Tenuipalpus dumus
- Tenuipalpus elegans
- Tenuipalpus elongatus
- Tenuipalpus emeticae.
- Tenuipalpus engelbrechti
- Tenuipalpus ephedrae
- Tenuipalpus erasus
- Tenuipalpus eremitus
- Tenuipalpus eriophyoides
- Tenuipalpus eucleae
- Tenuipalpus eugeniae
- Tenuipalpus euonymi
- Tenuipalpus falcatus
- Tenuipalpus faresianus
- Tenuipalpus faveolus
- Tenuipalpus feliciae
- Tenuipalpus ferosus
- Tenuipalpus fici
- Tenuipalpus filicicola
- Tenuipalpus flacourtiae
- Tenuipalpus flechtmanni
- Tenuipalpus frondosus
- Tenuipalpus galpiniae
- Tenuipalpus garciniae
- Tenuipalpus gatoomensis
- Tenuipalpus geigeriae
- Tenuipalpus ghaii
- Tenuipalpus granati
- Tenuipalpus grevilleae
- Tenuipalpus guamensis
- Tenuipalpus guettardae
- Tenuipalpus gumbolimbonis
- Tenuipalpus guptai
- Tenuipalpus haripuriensis
- Tenuipalpus hastaligni
- Tenuipalpus heteropyxis
- Tenuipalpus heveae
- Tenuipalpus hondurensis
- Tenuipalpus hornotinus
- Tenuipalpus hurae
- Tenuipalpus ilocanus
- Tenuipalpus imias
- Tenuipalpus indicus
- Tenuipalpus inophylli
- Tenuipalpus insularis
- Tenuipalpus isabelae
- Tenuipalpus ixorae
- Tenuipalpus jagatkhanaens
- Tenuipalpus jamaicensis
- Tenuipalpus jandialensis
- Tenuipalpus japonicus
- Tenuipalpus jasmini
- Tenuipalpus jawadii
- Tenuipalpus jianfengensis
- Tenuipalpus jonkeri
- Tenuipalpus jordaani
- Tenuipalpus jussiaeae
- Tenuipalpus kamalii
- Tenuipalpus kapoki
- Tenuipalpus karrooi
- Tenuipalpus keiensis
- Tenuipalpus kenos
- Tenuipalpus kesari
- Tenuipalpus knorri
- Tenuipalpus kobachidzei
- Tenuipalpus kraussianae
- Tenuipalpus lalbaghensis
- Tenuipalpus laminasetae
- Tenuipalpus lanceae
- Tenuipalpus latiseta
- Tenuipalpus lawrencei
- Tenuipalpus legatus
- Tenuipalpus leipoldti
- Tenuipalpus leonorae
- Tenuipalpus leucospermi
- Tenuipalpus lineosetosus
- Tenuipalpus lucumae
- Tenuipalpus ludhianaensis
- Tenuipalpus lulinicus
- Tenuipalpus lunatus
- Tenuipalpus lustrabilis
- Tenuipalpus lycioides
- Tenuipalpus lygodii
- Tenuipalpus magalismontani
- Tenuipalpus mahoensis
- Tenuipalpus malligai
- Tenuipalpus mallotae
- Tenuipalpus mandraensis
- Tenuipalpus mansoni
- Tenuipalpus mansoniculus
- Tenuipalpus matthyssei
- Tenuipalpus melhaniae
- Tenuipalpus menglunensis
- Tenuipalpus metis
- Tenuipalpus metopii
- Tenuipalpus micheli
- Tenuipalpus microphylli
- Tenuipalpus mkuziensis
- Tenuipalpus molinai
- Tenuipalpus montanus
- Tenuipalpus mopaneae
- Tenuipalpus moraesi
- Tenuipalpus morianus
- Tenuipalpus mourerae
- Tenuipalpus muguanicus
- Tenuipalpus mustus
- Tenuipalpus myrtus
- Tenuipalpus namaensis
- Tenuipalpus nenaxi
- Tenuipalpus niekerkae
- Tenuipalpus nigerianus
- Tenuipalpus obvelatus
- Tenuipalpus oliveirai
- Tenuipalpus omani
- Tenuipalpus ombrensis
- Tenuipalpus orchidofilo
- Tenuipalpus oribiensis
- Tenuipalpus orilloi
- Tenuipalpus ortus
- Tenuipalpus ovalis
- Tenuipalpus oxalis
- Tenuipalpus pacificus
- Tenuipalpus pagesae
- Tenuipalpus pagina
- Tenuipalpus palosapis
- Tenuipalpus panici
- Tenuipalpus papiothalensis
- Tenuipalpus pareriophyiodes
- Tenuipalpus parsii
- Tenuipalpus pedrus
- Tenuipalpus pernicis
- Tenuipalpus persicae
- Tenuipalpus philippinensis
- Tenuipalpus pieteri
- Tenuipalpus pigrus
- Tenuipalpus pisinnus
- Tenuipalpus placitus
- Tenuipalpus platycaryae
- Tenuipalpus podocarpi
- Tenuipalpus populi
- Tenuipalpus portulacae
- Tenuipalpus proctori
- Tenuipalpus proteae
- Tenuipalpus protectus
- Tenuipalpus protumidus
- Tenuipalpus pruni
- Tenuipalpus prunioides
- Tenuipalpus pseudocedrelae
- Tenuipalpus punicae
- Tenuipalpus punjabensis
- Tenuipalpus pyroides
- Tenuipalpus pyrusae
- Tenuipalpus qingchengensis
- Tenuipalpus rangiorae
- Tenuipalpus raphiae
- Tenuipalpus raptor
- Tenuipalpus rarus
- Tenuipalpus reticulus
- Tenuipalpus rhagicus
- Tenuipalpus rhizophorae
- Tenuipalpus rhusi
- Tenuipalpus rhysus
- Tenuipalpus robustae
- Tenuipalpus rodionovi
- Tenuipalpus rosae
- Tenuipalpus rusapensis
- Tenuipalpus sagittus
- Tenuipalpus salicis
- Tenuipalpus sanblasensis
- Tenuipalpus sandyi
- Tenuipalpus santae
- Tenuipalpus sanyaensis
- Tenuipalpus scitulus
- Tenuipalpus sclerocaryae
- Tenuipalpus senecionis
- Tenuipalpus sharmai
- Tenuipalpus simarubae
- Tenuipalpus simplex
- Tenuipalpus simplychus
- Tenuipalpus smithi
- Tenuipalpus solanensis
- Tenuipalpus sophiae
- Tenuipalpus sparsus
- Tenuipalpus spatulatus
- Tenuipalpus spinosaurus
- Tenuipalpus stativus
- Tenuipalpus stefani
- Tenuipalpus striolatus
- Tenuipalpus tabebuiae
- Tenuipalpus taonicus
- Tenuipalpus tapirirae
- Tenuipalpus tauricus
- Tenuipalpus tectonae
- Tenuipalpus tepicanus
- Tenuipalpus terminaliae
- Tenuipalpus tetrazygiae
- Tenuipalpus toowongi
- Tenuipalpus tortulus
- Tenuipalpus transvaalensis
- Tenuipalpus trichiliae
- Tenuipalpus trifoliatae
- Tenuipalpus trisegmentus
- Tenuipalpus trisetosus
- Tenuipalpus tuttlei
- Tenuipalpus ueckermanni
- Tenuipalpus umarii
- Tenuipalpus unimerus
- Tenuipalpus unonopsonis
- Tenuipalpus uvae
- Tenuipalpus velitor
- Tenuipalpus venustus
- Tenuipalpus vernoniae
- Tenuipalpus vexus
- Tenuipalpus victoriae
- Tenuipalpus vitexi
- Tenuipalpus viticola
- Tenuipalpus vriddagiriensis
- Tenuipalpus waqasii
- Tenuipalpus xerocolus
- Tenuipalpus xylosmae
- Tenuipalpus yarensis
- Tenuipalpus yousefi
- Tenuipalpus zanthus
- Tenuipalpus zeyheri
- Tenuipalpus zhengzhouensis
- Tenuipalpus zhizhilashviliae
- Tenuipalpus zuluensis
