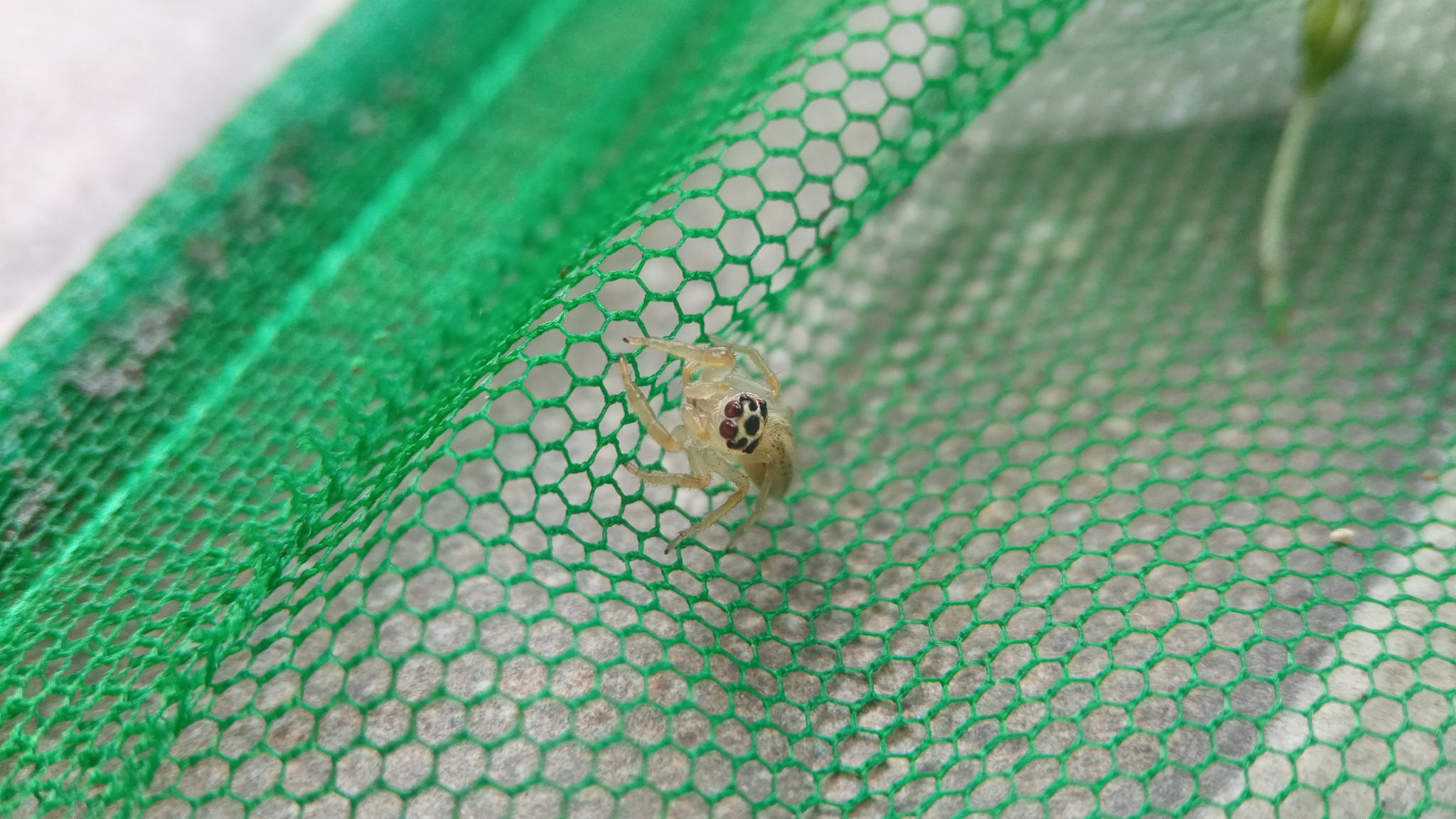
- from Colombia
- male from original description

Scientific classification
- Kingdom: Animalia
- Phylum: Arthropoda
- Subphylum: Chelicerata
- Class: Arachnida
- Order: Araneae
- Infraorder: Araneomorphae
- Family: Salticidae
- Genus: Colonus
- Species: C. pallidus

Binomial name
- Colonus pallidus (C. L. Koch, 1846)

Synonyms
- Alcmena pallida C. L. Koch, 1846; Dendryphantes pallida (C. L. Koch, 1846); Maevia stellifera Holmberg, 1876; Maevia viridis Holmberg, 1876; Thiodina pallida (C. L. Koch, 1846)

= Colonus pallidus =

Species of spider

Colonus pallidus is a species of jumping spider in the family Salticidae. It is found throughout Central and South America.

== Etymology ==
The specific name pallidus is derived from Latin meaning "pale", referring to the spider's coloration.

== Distribution ==
C. pallidus has been recorded from El Salvador, Nicaragua, Colombia, Venezuela, Trinidad and Tobago, Guyana, Suriname, French Guiana, Peru, Brazil, Paraguay, and Argentina.

== Description ==
Colonus pallidus is a small jumping spider with a body length of approximately 3-5 mm.

=== Females ===
Females show some variation in coloration. One form described by Holmberg has a totally black head dorsally, featuring a five-rayed star of almost white color that divides the head into five parts. The opisthosoma displays a double longitudinal row of dark stripes directed obliquely outward and backward.

=== Males ===
Males have a reddish-brown cephalothorax with black eyes positioned in a darker shadow. They display yellowish-white scales, particularly covering the sides, with exposed areas being strongly glossy. The chelicerae are somewhat hidden under the head and dark rust-brown in color. The pedipalps are ochre-yellow with the terminal segment being somewhat darker, and the genitalia are blackish-brown.

The cephalothorax is broad and high, with the thoracic region narrowed posteriorly and strongly roof-shaped. The opisthosoma is thin, long, and cone-shaped at the posterior end.

The opisthosoma is beautifully olive-yellow with two longitudinal stripes extending over the sides that are bright yellowish-white. On the posterior half, there is a row of black dots, with two of these extending further inward. The ventral surface is bright yellow with a whitish coating on both sides and a bright yellowish-white longitudinal stripe.

The legs are yellow, with the femora of the four anterior legs being brown at the tips. The knees and tibiae have a rust-brown coating, while the tarsal tips are finely black.
