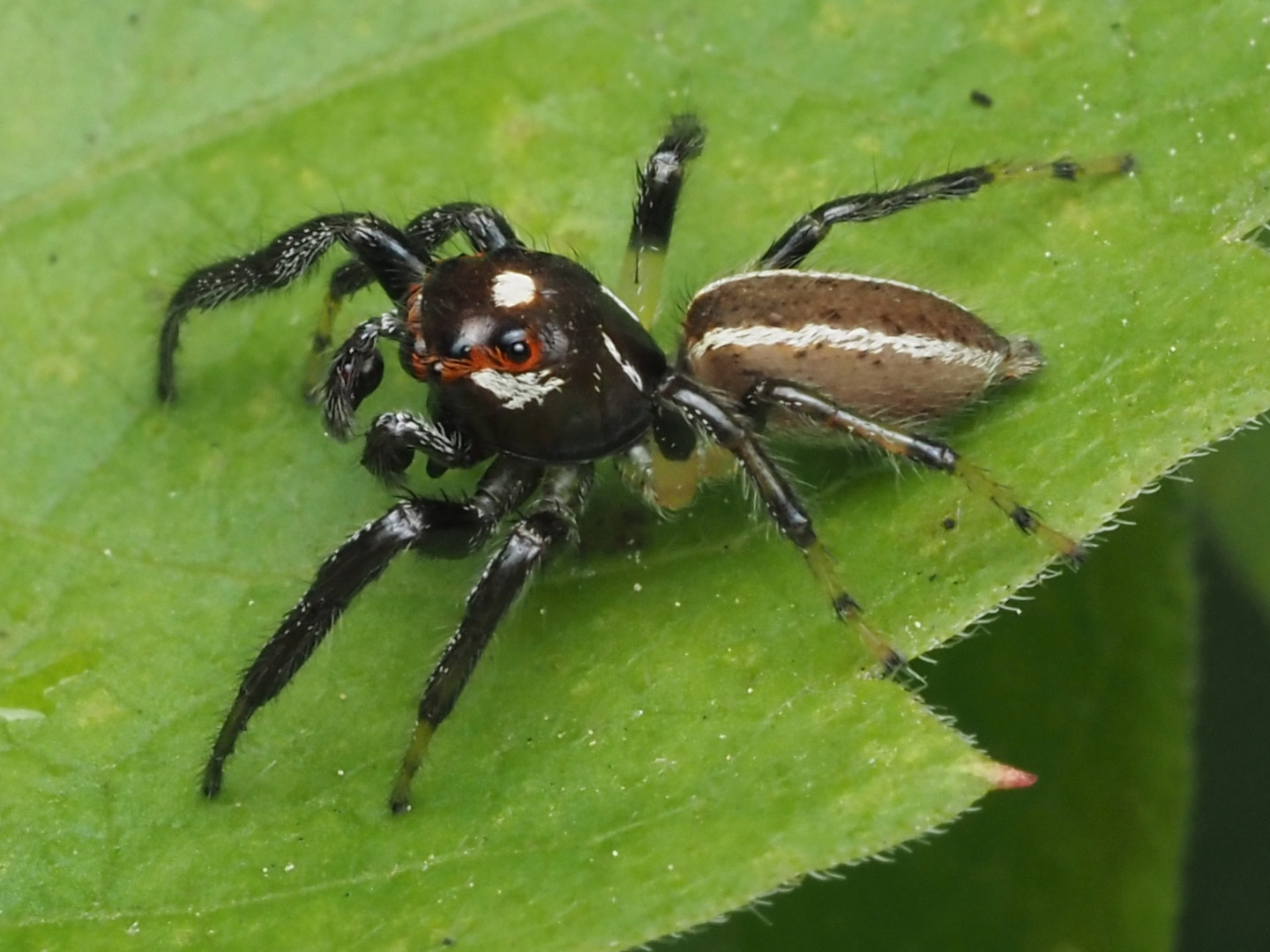
- Male
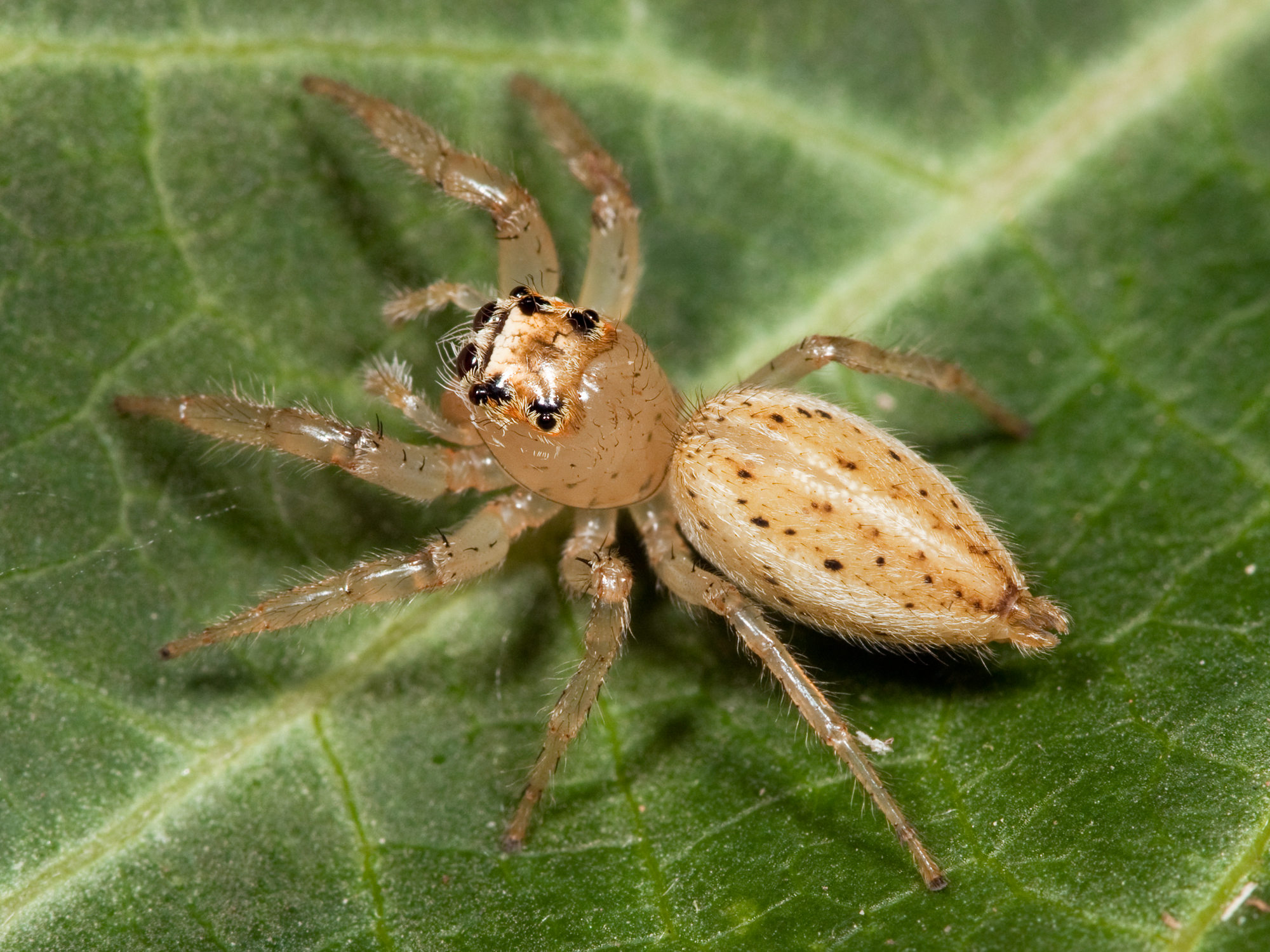
- Female

Scientific classification
- Kingdom: Animalia
- Phylum: Arthropoda
- Subphylum: Chelicerata
- Class: Arachnida
- Order: Araneae
- Infraorder: Araneomorphae
- Family: Salticidae
- Genus: Colonus
- Species: C. sylvanus

Binomial name
- Colonus sylvanus (Hentz, 1846)

= Colonus sylvanus =

Species of spider

Colonus sylvanus, or the sylvan jumping spider, is a species of jumping spider. It is found in a range from the United States to Panama. It was first described by entomologist Nicholas Marcellus Hentz in 1846 based on specimens from South Carolina.
