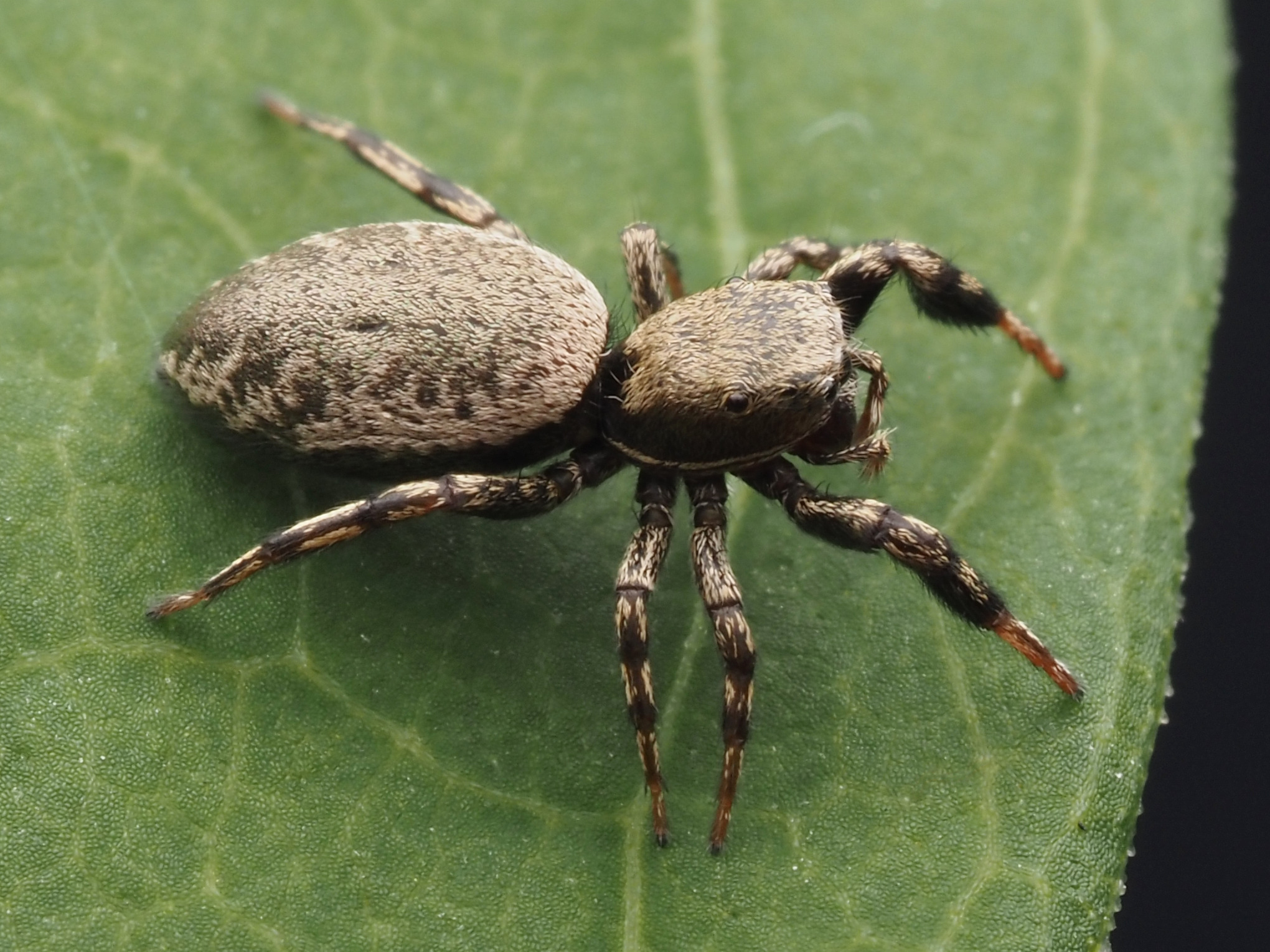
- Female
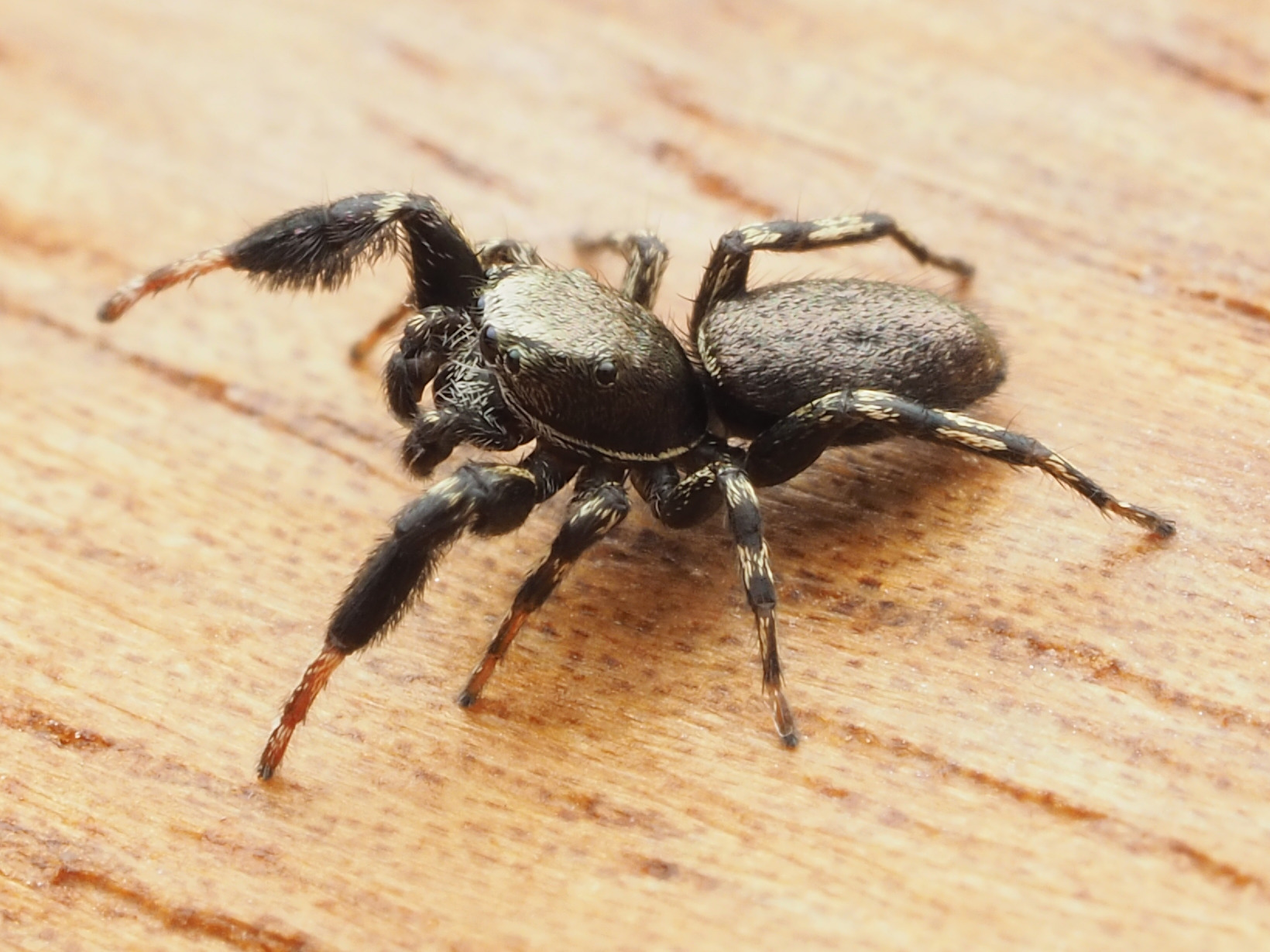
- Male

Scientific classification
- Kingdom: Animalia
- Phylum: Arthropoda
- Subphylum: Chelicerata
- Class: Arachnida
- Order: Araneae
- Infraorder: Araneomorphae
- Family: Salticidae
- Genus: Tutelina
- Species: T. harti

Binomial name
- Tutelina harti (Peckham, 1891)

= Tutelina harti =

Species of spider

Tutelina harti is a species of jumping spider. It is found in the United States and Canada.

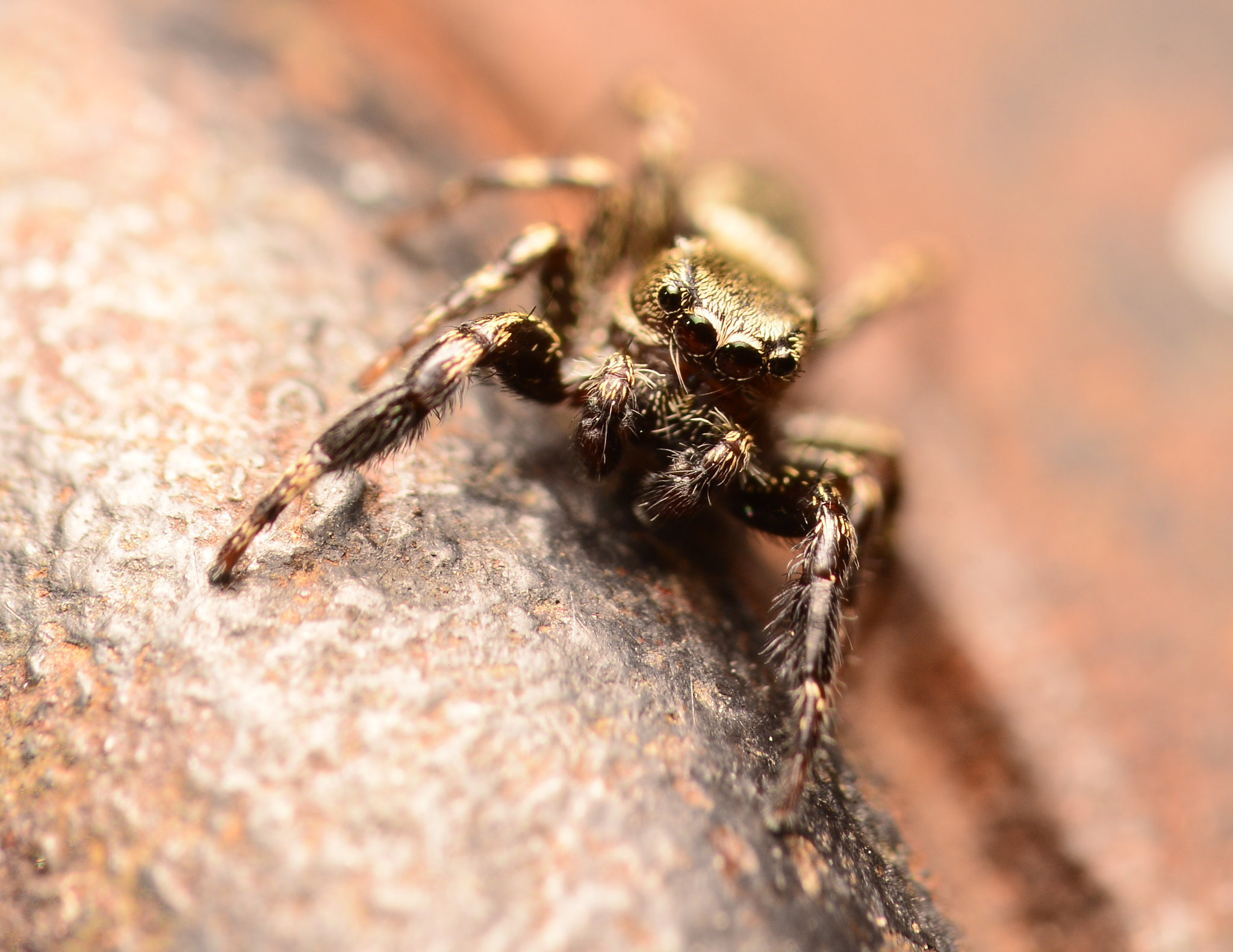
Adult male face

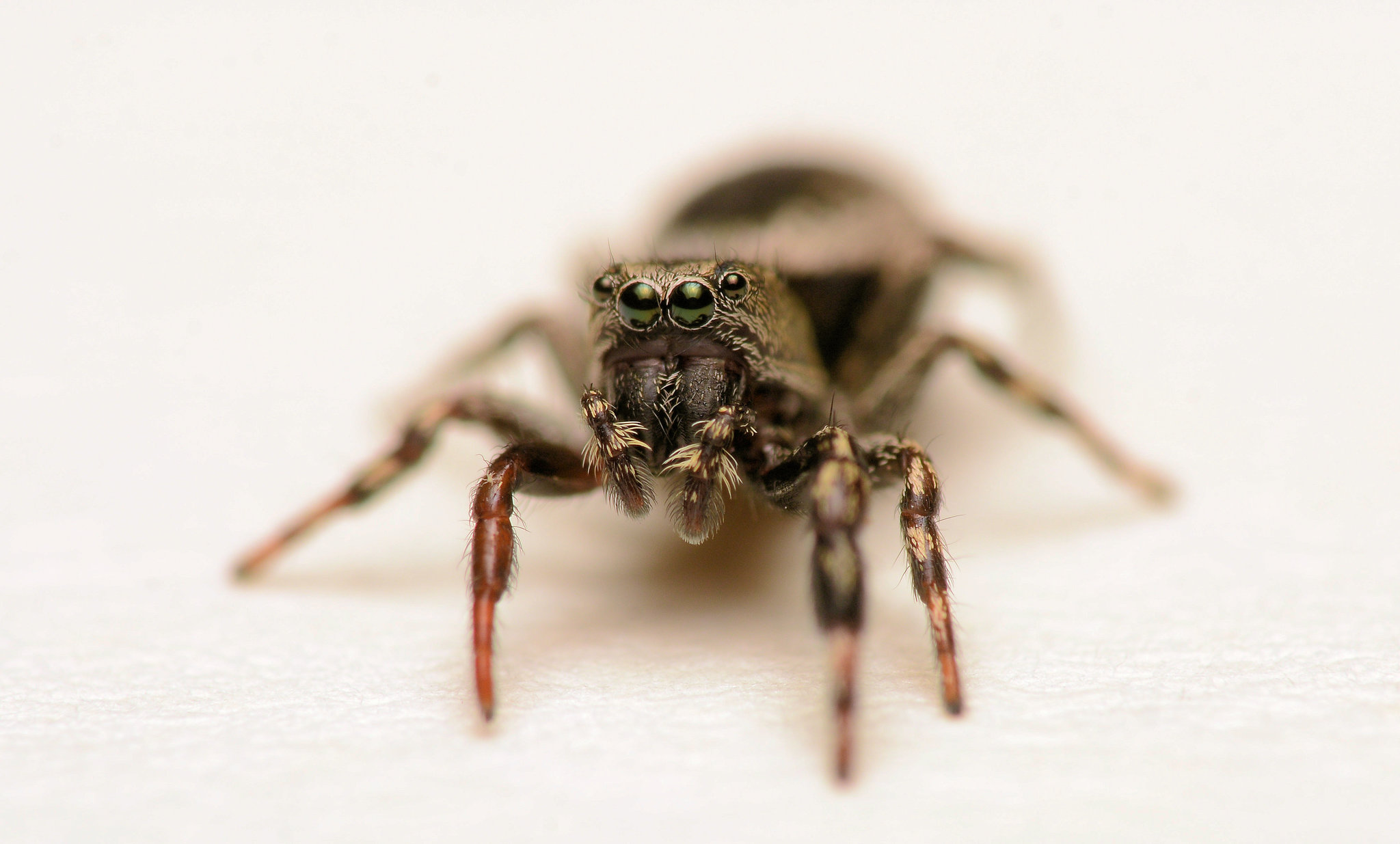
Adult female face

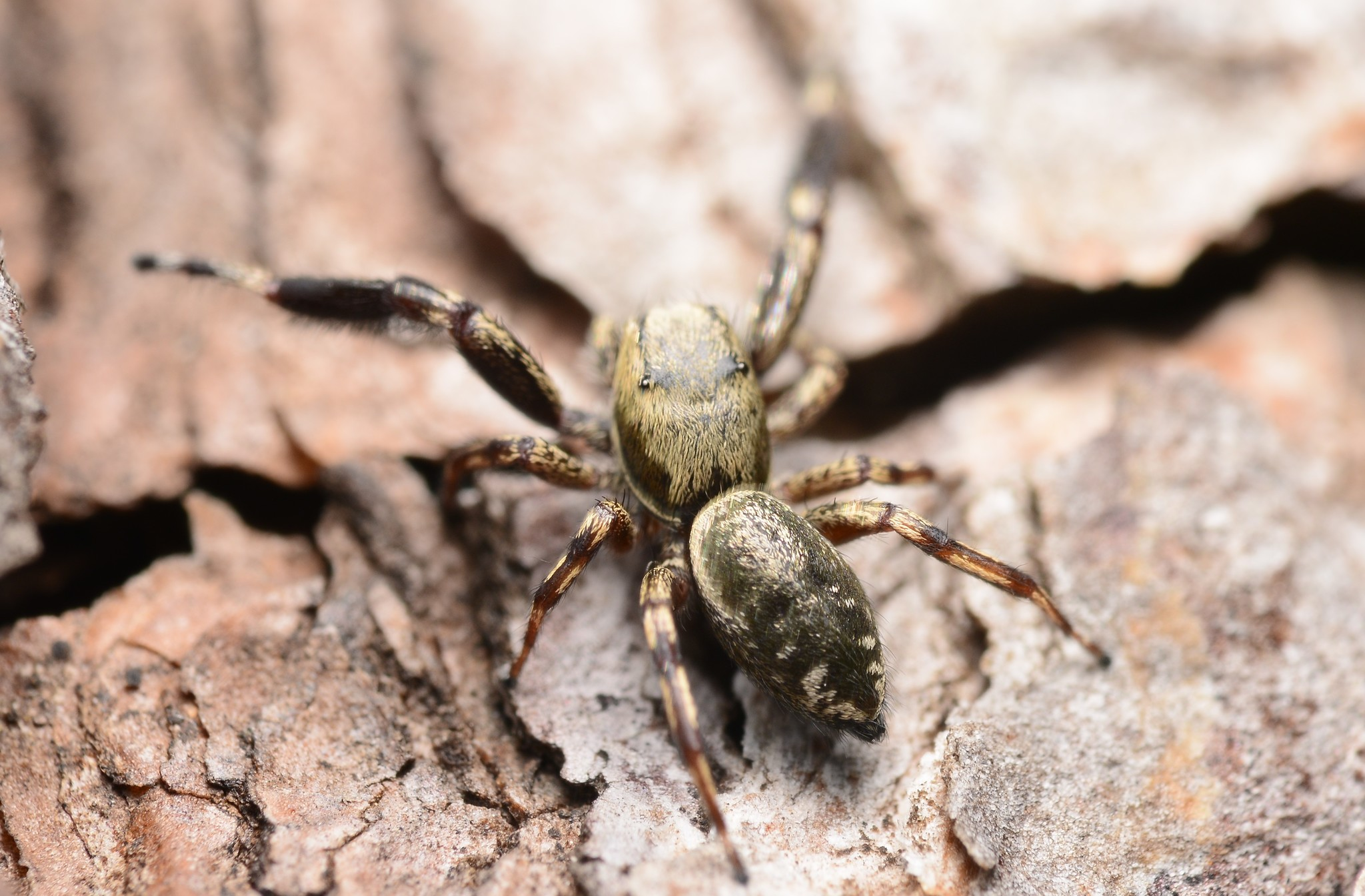
Adult male dorsal

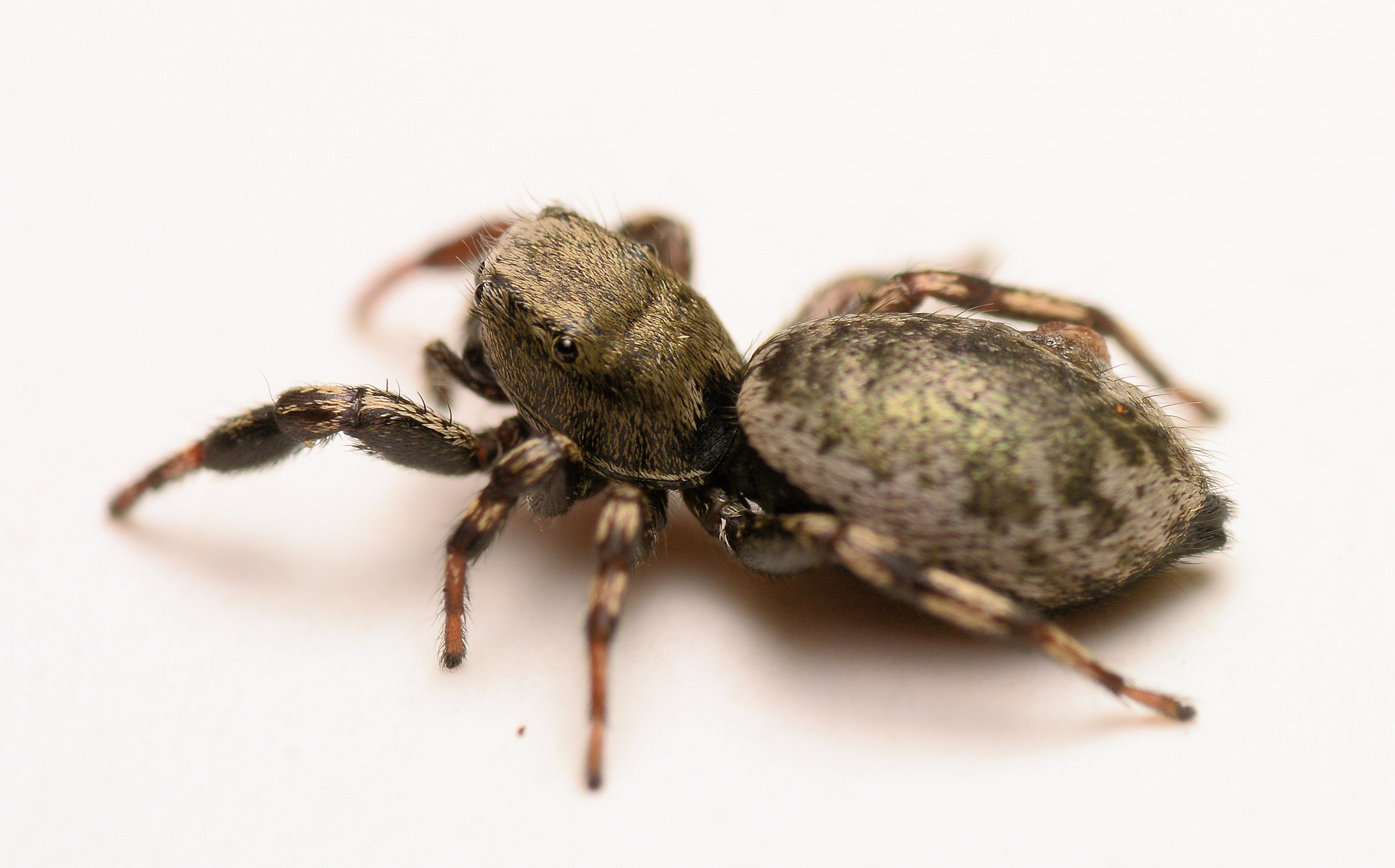
Adult female dorsal
