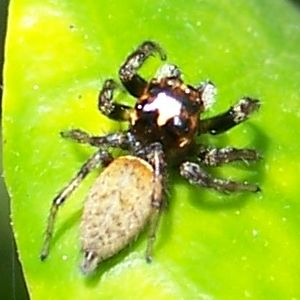
- Male
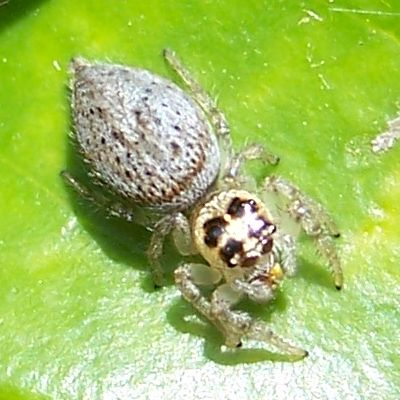
- Female

Scientific classification
- Kingdom: Animalia
- Phylum: Arthropoda
- Subphylum: Chelicerata
- Class: Arachnida
- Order: Araneae
- Infraorder: Araneomorphae
- Family: Salticidae
- Genus: Colonus
- Species: C. hesperus

Binomial name
- Colonus hesperus (Richman & Vetter, 2004)

Synonyms
- Thiodina hespera Richman & Vetter, 2004

= Colonus hesperus =

Species of spider

Colonus hesperus is a species of jumping spider in the family Salticidae. Its range consists of parts of the southwestern United States including California, Arizona, New Mexico, and Texas, with its range further extending to Mexico. The species is active throughout the year, however it has a peak in abundance in April and May. The species was first described by David Richman and Richard Vetter in 2004 based on specimens from San Diego, California.
