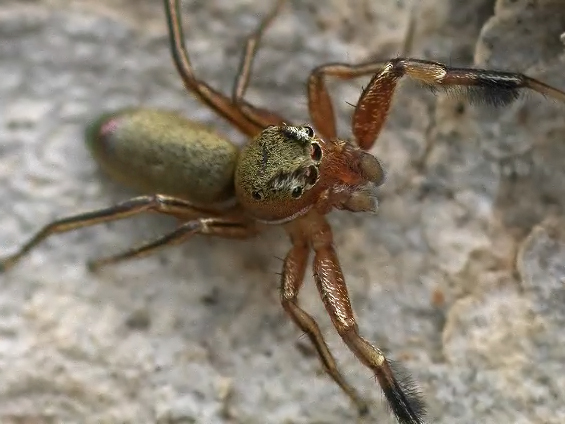
- T. elegans, male

Scientific classification
- Kingdom: Animalia
- Phylum: Arthropoda
- Subphylum: Chelicerata
- Class: Arachnida
- Order: Araneae
- Infraorder: Araneomorphae
- Family: Salticidae
- Subfamily: Salticinae
- Genus: Tutelina; Simon, 1901

Type species
- T. elegans (Hentz, 1846)

Species
- 6, see text

= Tutelina =

Genus of spiders

Tutelina is a genus of jumping spiders that was first described by Eugène Louis Simon in 1901.

== Species ==
As of August 2019 it contains six species, found in Ecuador, Guyana, Canada, and the United States:

- Tutelina elegans (Hentz, 1846) (type) – USA
- Tutelina formicaria (Emerton, 1891) – USA
- Tutelina harti (Emerton, 1891) – USA, Canada
- Tutelina purpurina Mello-Leitão, 1948 – Guyana
- Tutelina rosenbergi Simon, 1901 – Ecuador
- Tutelina similis (Banks, 1895) – USA, Canada
