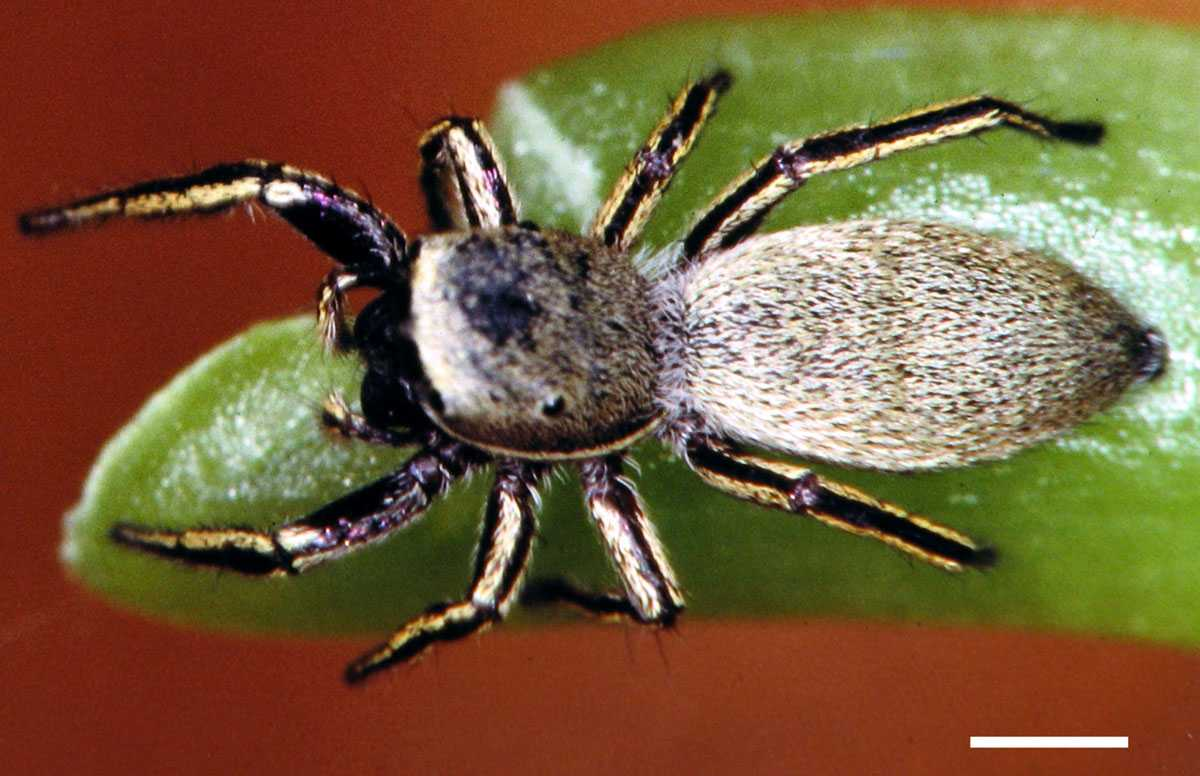
- Female from Minnesota

Scientific classification
- Kingdom: Animalia
- Phylum: Arthropoda
- Subphylum: Chelicerata
- Class: Arachnida
- Order: Araneae
- Infraorder: Araneomorphae
- Family: Salticidae
- Genus: Tutelina
- Species: T. similis

Binomial name
- Tutelina similis (Banks, 1895)

= Tutelina similis =

Species of spider

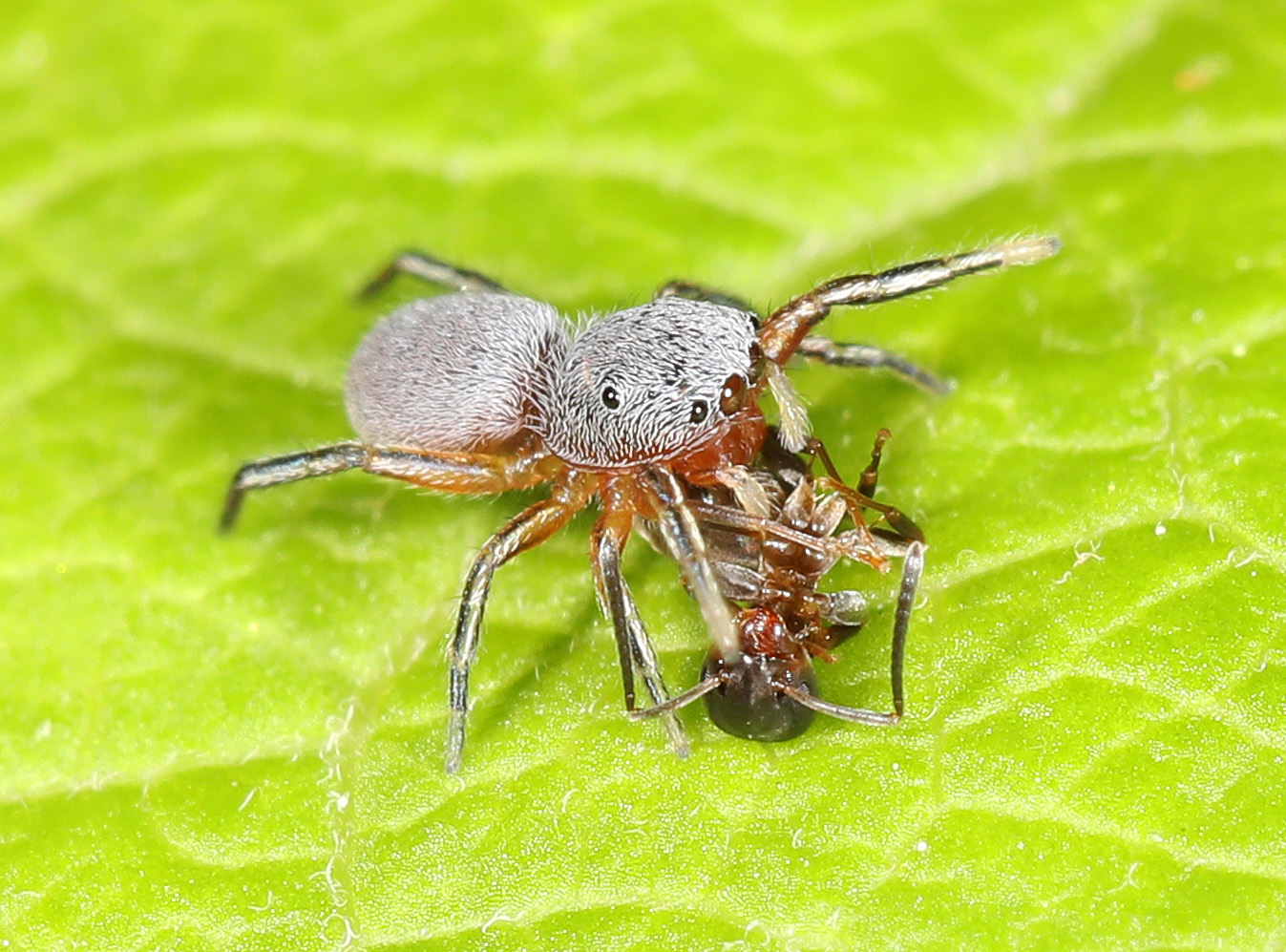
Tutelina similis

Tutelina similis is a species of jumping spider in the family Salticidae. It is found in the United States and Canada.
