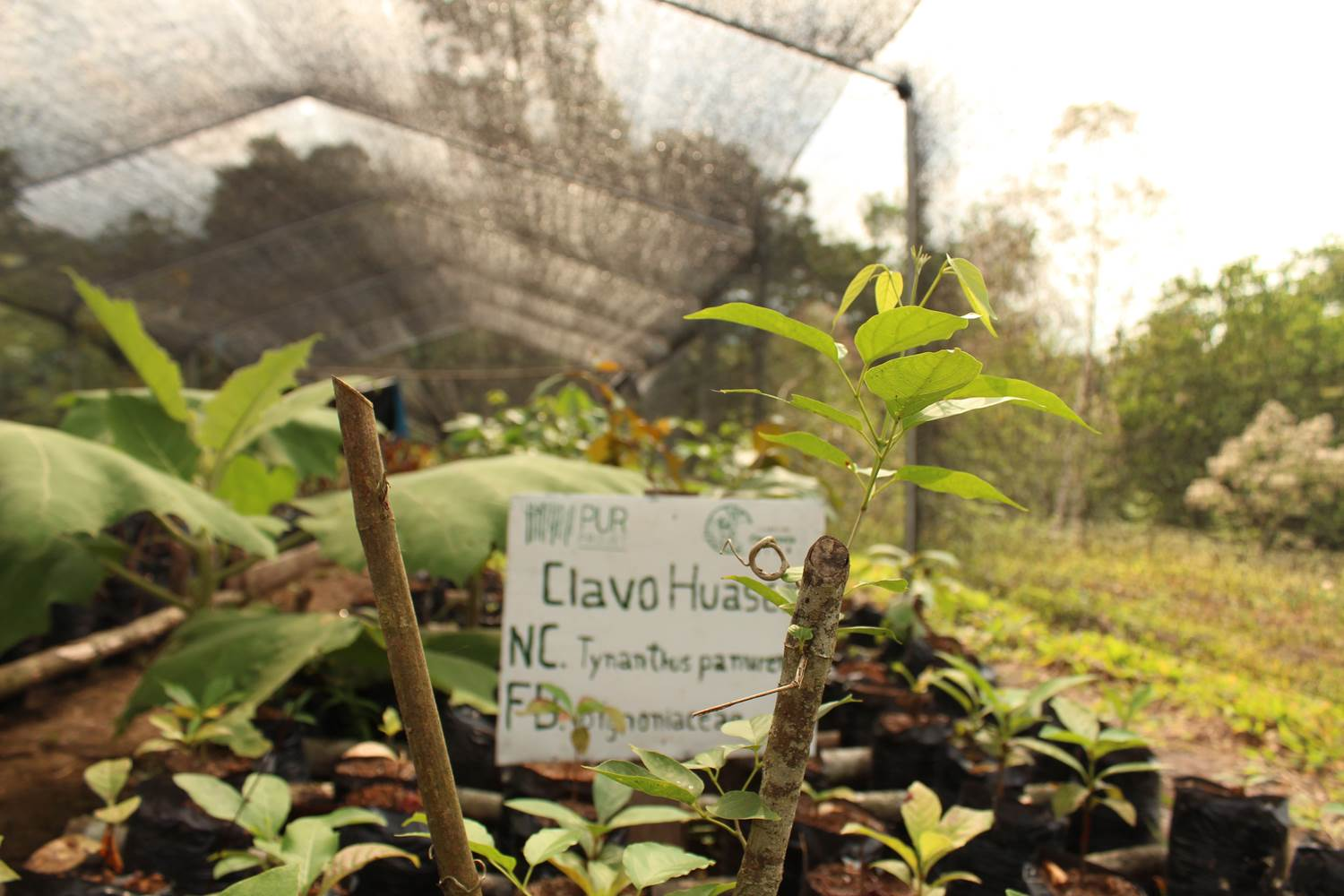

Scientific classification
- Kingdom: Plantae
- Clade: Tracheophytes
- Clade: Angiosperms
- Clade: Eudicots
- Clade: Asterids
- Order: Lamiales
- Family: Bignoniaceae
- Tribe: Bignonieae
- Genus: Tynanthus; Miers

Synonyms
- Heterotypic Synonyms: Schizopsis Bureau; Tynnanthus K.Schum.

= Tynanthus =

Genus of flowering plants

Tynanthus is a genus of woody flowering plants in the family Bignoniaceae.

== Species ==
Accepted species include:

- Tynanthus cognatus (Cham.) Miers
- Tynanthus croatianus A.H.Gentry
- Tynanthus densiflorus M.C.Medeiros & L.G.Lohmann
- Tynanthus espiritosantensis M.C.Medeiros & L.G.Lohmann
- Tynanthus fasciculatus (Vell.) Miers
- Tynanthus goudotianus (Bureau) Bureau
- Tynanthus guatemalensis Donn.Sm.
- Tynanthus labiatus (Cham.) Miers
- Tynanthus macranthus L.O.Williams
- Tynanthus micranthus Corr.Méllo ex K.Schum.
- Tynanthus panurensis (Bureau) Sandwith
- Tynanthus polyanthus (Bureau) Sandwith
- Tynanthus pubescens A.H.Gentry
- Tynanthus sastrei A.H.Gentry
- Tynanthus schumannianus (Kuntze) A.H.Gentry
