= Tenuipalpus elegans =

Scientific classification
- Domain: Eukaryota
- Kingdom: Animalia
- Phylum: Arthropoda
- Subphylum: Chelicerata
- Class: Arachnida
- Order: Trombidiformes
- Family: Tenuipalpidae
- Genus: Tenuipalpus
- Species: T. elegans

Binomial name
- Tenuipalpus elegans (Collyer, 1973)

Synonyms
- Colopalpus elegans

Species of mite

Tenuipalpus elegans is a species of mite in the genus Tenuipalpus.
