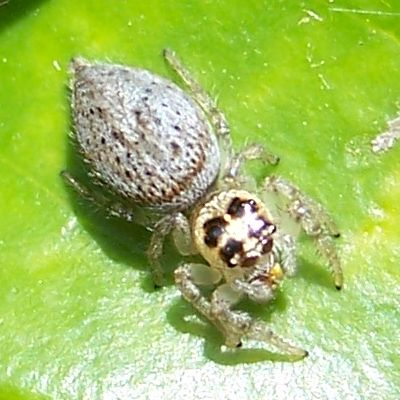

Scientific classification
- Kingdom: Animalia
- Phylum: Arthropoda
- Subphylum: Chelicerata
- Class: Arachnida
- Order: Araneae
- Infraorder: Araneomorphae
- Family: Salticidae
- Subfamily: Salticinae
- Genus: Thiodina; Simon, 1900

Type species
- T. nicoleti Roewer, 1951

Species
- 7, see text

= Thiodina =

Genus of spiders

Thiodina is a genus of jumping spiders that was first described by Eugène Louis Simon in 1900.

== Species ==
Many former Thiodina species were transferred to the genus Colonus. T. inquies and T. irrorata are both considered nomen dubia. As of March 2023 it contains seven species:

- Thiodina camilae Bustamante & Ruiz, 2020 – Dominican Republic
- Thiodina firme Bustamante & Ruiz, 2017 – Brazil
- Thiodina minuta (Galiano, 1977) – Peru
- Thiodina nicoleti Roewer, 1951 (type) – Chile
- Thiodina perian Bustamante & Ruiz, 2017 – Mexico
- Thiodina tefyta Rubio, Baigorria & Stolar, 2023 – Argentina
- Thiodina tyrioni Bustamante & Ruiz, 2020 – USA
