= Tynanthus elegans =

Scientific classification
- Kingdom: Plantae
- Clade: Tracheophytes
- Clade: Angiosperms
- Clade: Eudicots
- Clade: Asterids
- Order: Lamiales
- Family: Bignoniaceae
- Genus: Tynanthus
- Species: T. elegans

Binomial name
- Tynanthus elegans Miers

Synonyms
- Bignonia elegans Cham. 1832; Schizopsis regnelliana Bureau ex Baill.

Species of flowering plant

Tynanthus elegans, the cipó-cravo or cipó-trindade in Portuguese, is a species of flowering plants in the family Bignoniaceae. It is found in Bolivia and Brazil.
