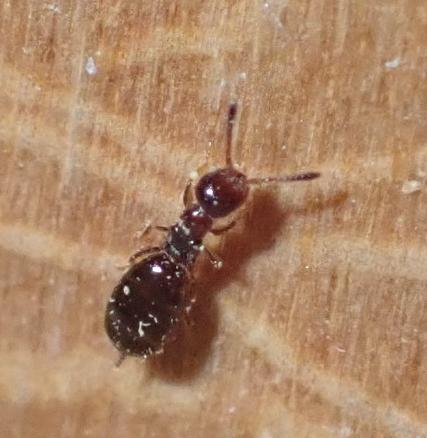
- Theocolax formiciformis female

Scientific classification
- Kingdom: Animalia
- Phylum: Arthropoda
- Class: Insecta
- Order: Hymenoptera
- Superfamily: Chalcidoidea
- Family: Cerocephalidae; Gahan, 1946

Type genus
- Cerocephala Westwood, 1832

Genera
- See text

= Cerocephalidae =

Family of wasps

Cerocephalidae is a small family of chalcid wasps, previously classified as subfamily Cerocephalinae, in the polyphyletic family Pteromalidae. Most species are parasitoids of small wood-boring beetles.

== Genera ==
- Acerocephala
- Cerocephala
- Choetospilisca
- Gahanisca
- Gnathophorisca
- Laesthiola
- Muesebeckisia
- Neocalosoter
- Neosciatheras
- Paracerocephala
- Paralaesthia
- Sciatherellus
- Theocolax

Fossil genera: Dominocephala, Pteropilosa, Tenuicornis.

== Description ==
The antennae have up to 10 flagellomeres (up to 3 clavomeres). There is a prominence between the toruli (bases of the antennae). Eyes are not ventrally divergent, and mandibles have two or more teeth. All legs have five tarsomeres and the protibial spur is stout and curved. The metasoma has a syntergum.

== Gallery ==
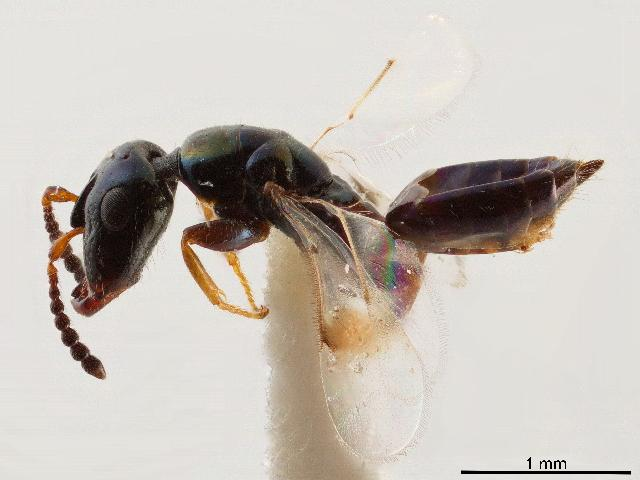
Acerocephala atroviolacea

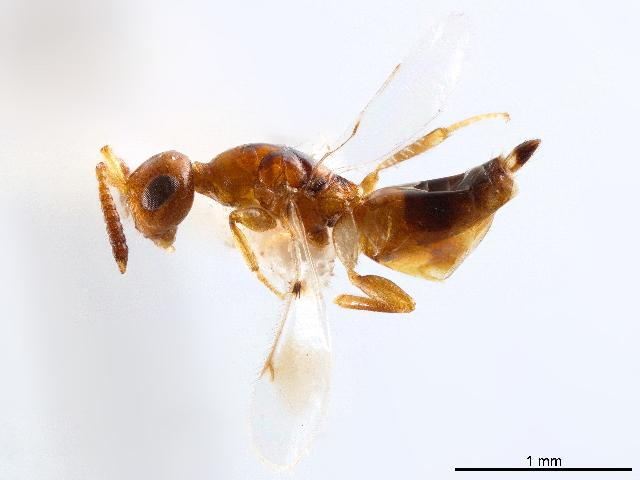
Cerocephala eccoptogastri

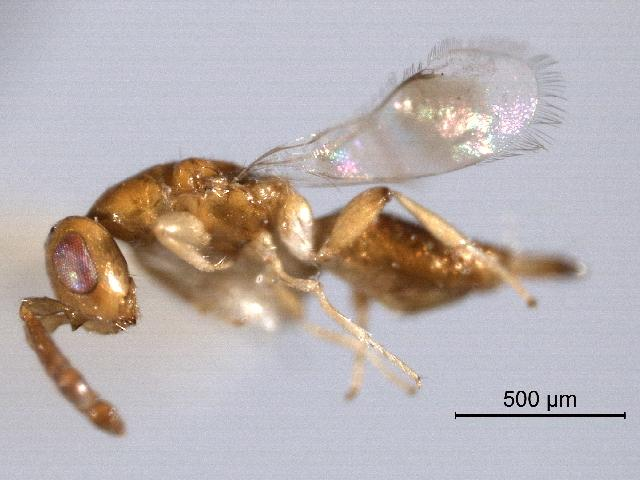
Neocalosoter scolytivora

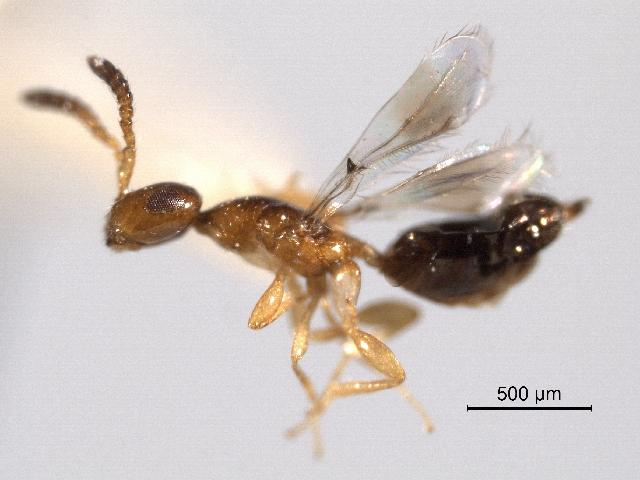
Theocolax elegans
