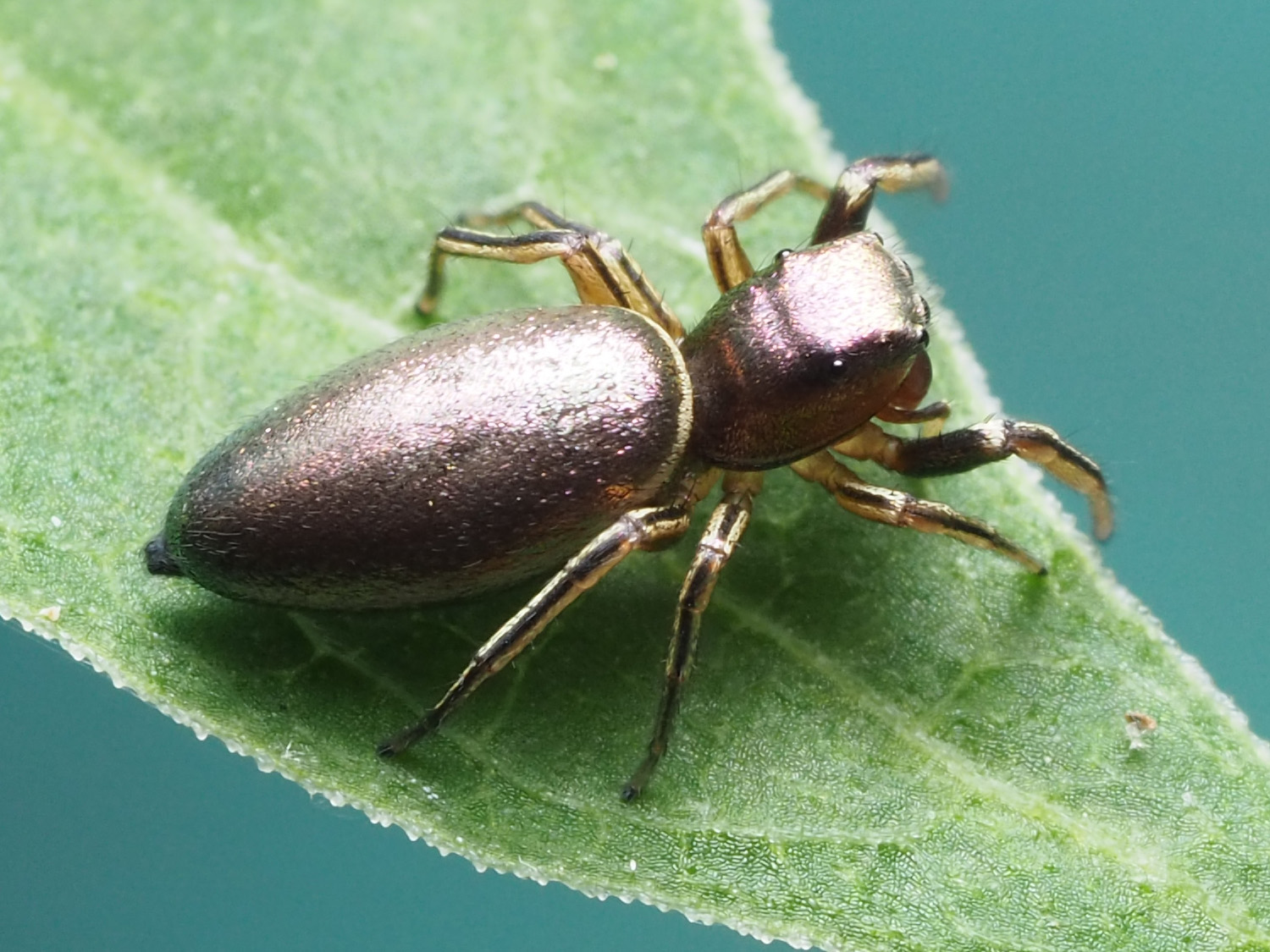
- Female
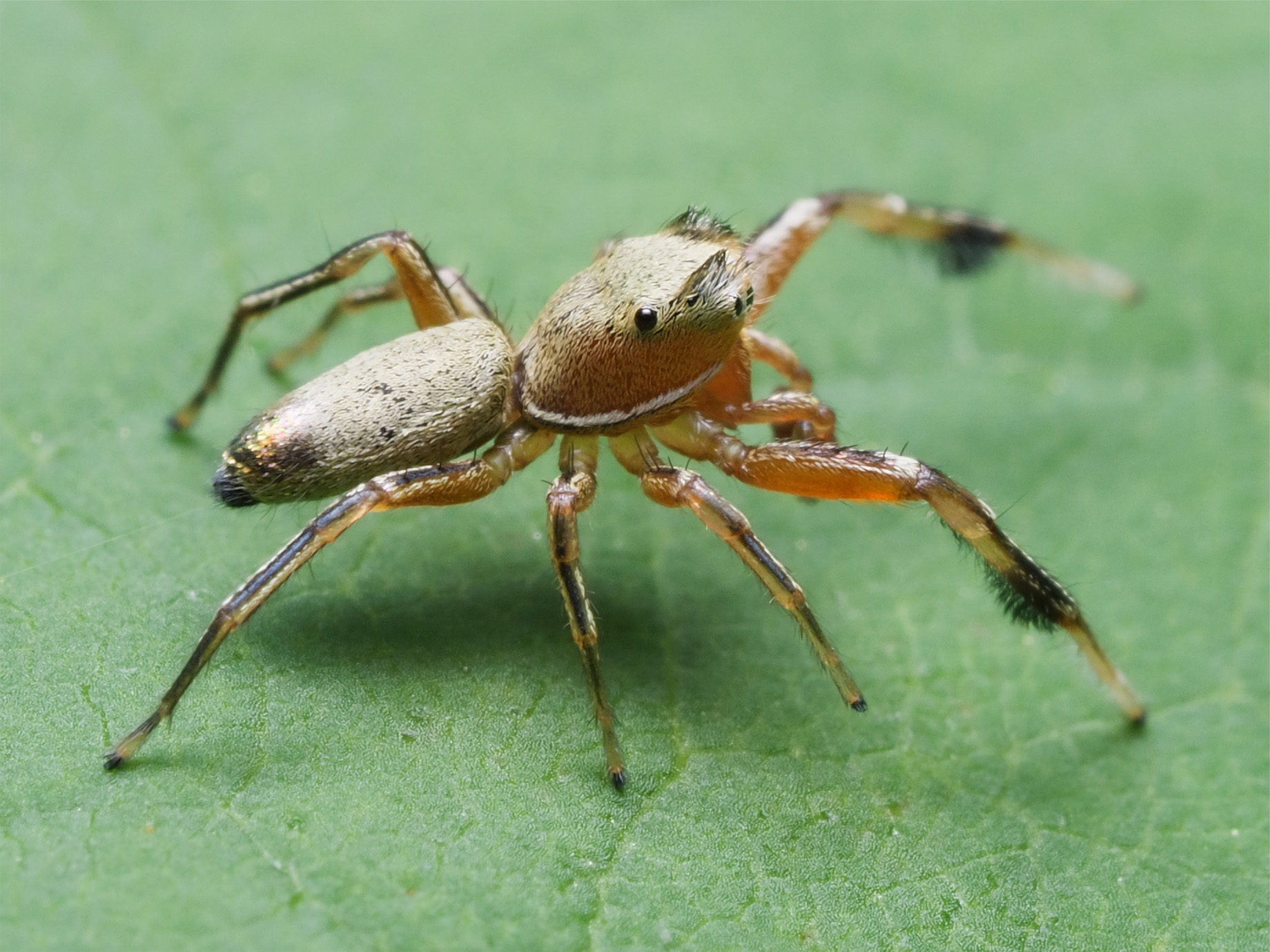
- Male

Scientific classification
- Kingdom: Animalia
- Phylum: Arthropoda
- Subphylum: Chelicerata
- Class: Arachnida
- Order: Araneae
- Infraorder: Araneomorphae
- Family: Salticidae
- Genus: Tutelina
- Species: T. elegans

Binomial name
- Tutelina elegans (Hentz, 1846)

Synonyms
- Attus elegans Hentz, 1846; Attus superciliosus Hentz, 1846; Maevia cristata C. L. Koch, 1846; Maevia aurulenta C. L. Koch, 1846; Attus tibialis Peckham & Peckham, 1883

= Tutelina elegans =

Thin-spined Jumping Spider

Species of jumping spider

Tutelina elegans is a species of jumping spider in the family Salticidae. It is found in Canada and the United States.

== Etymology ==
The species name elegans is Latin, meaning "elegant" or "refined", referring to the attractive metallic appearance of this spider.

== Distribution ==
T. elegans is distributed across North America, being recorded from Canada and the United States.

== Description ==
Tutelina elegans is a small spider, measuring from a sixth to a quarter of an inch (approximately 4-6 mm) in body length.

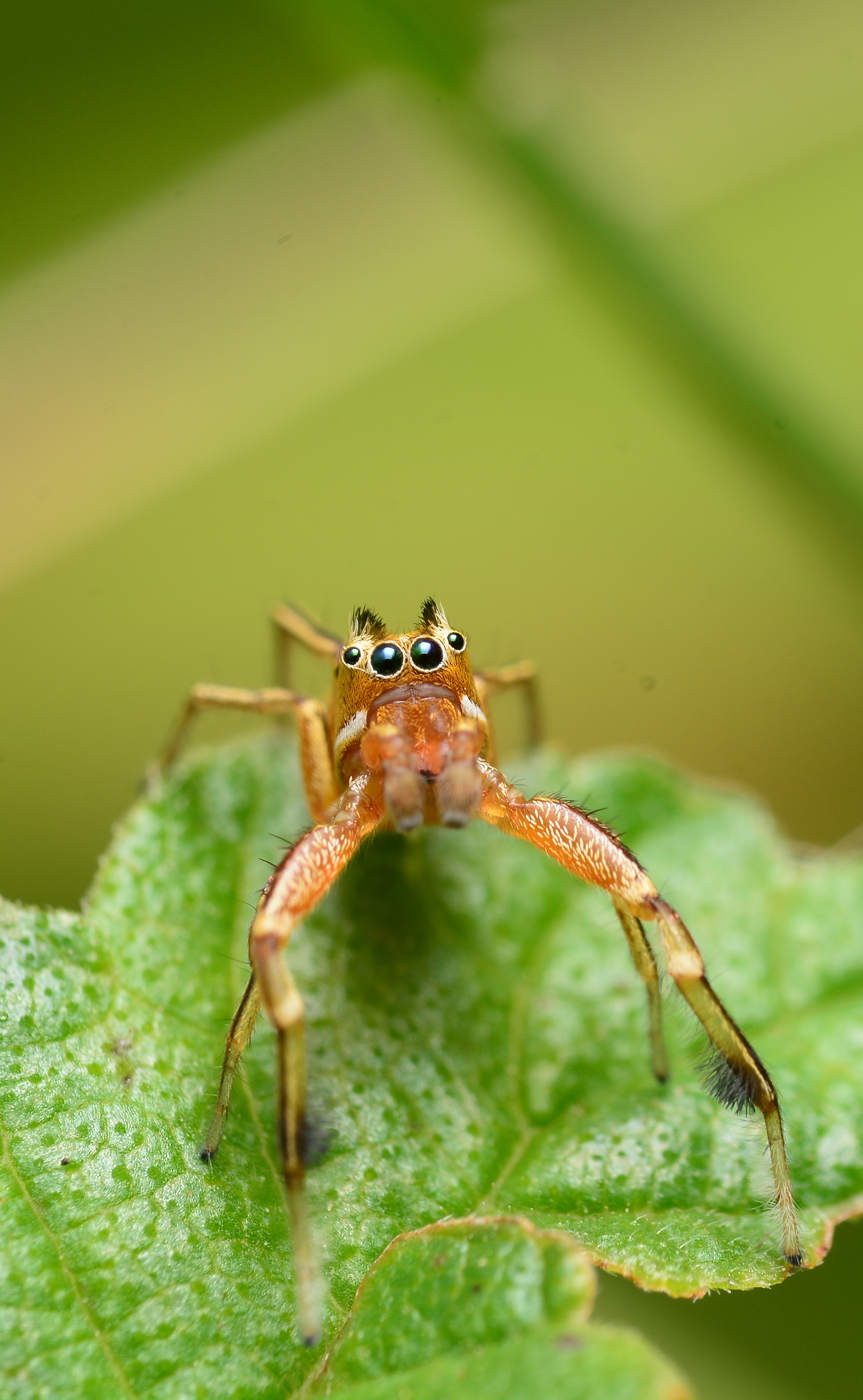
Male face

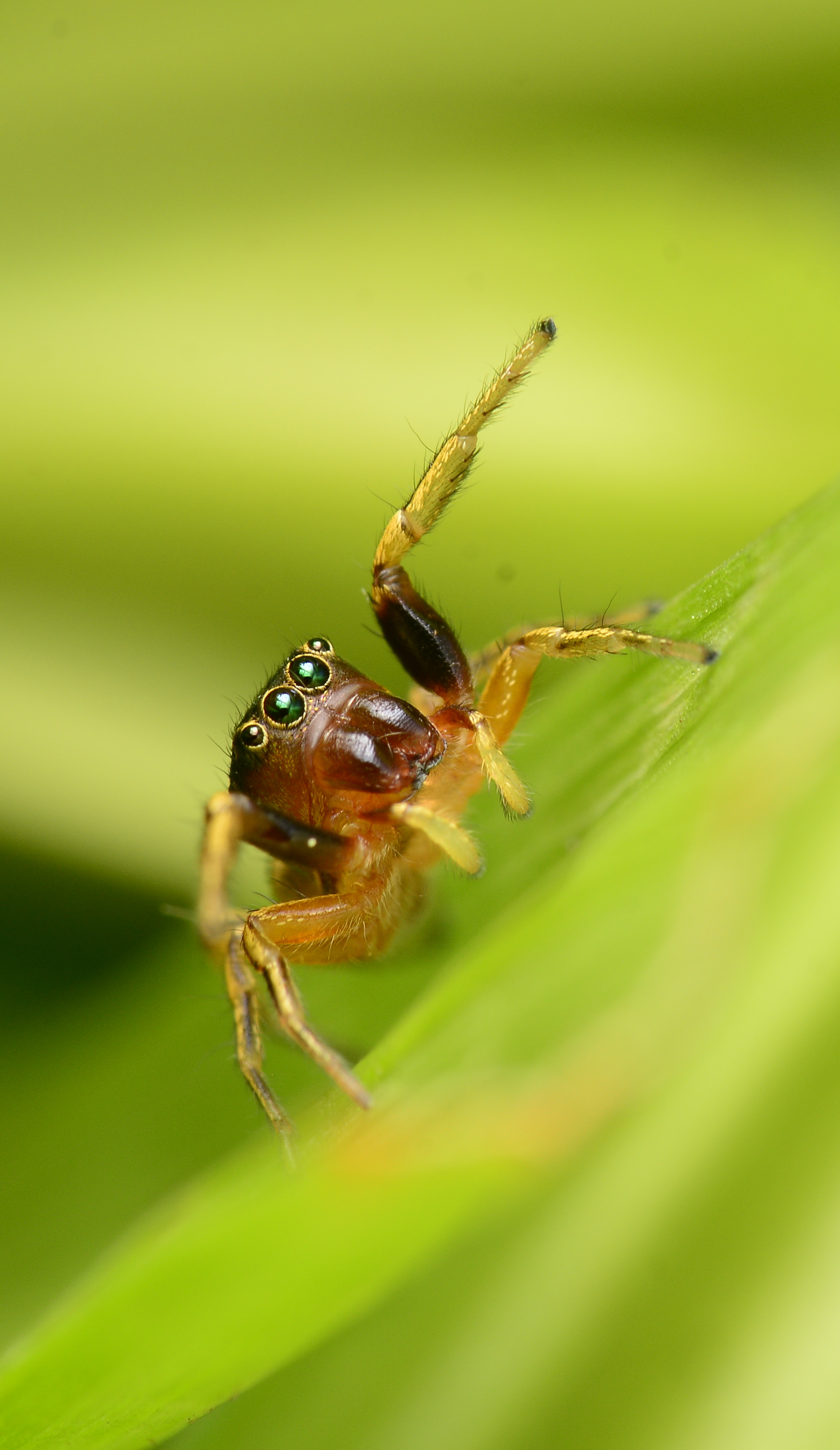
Female face

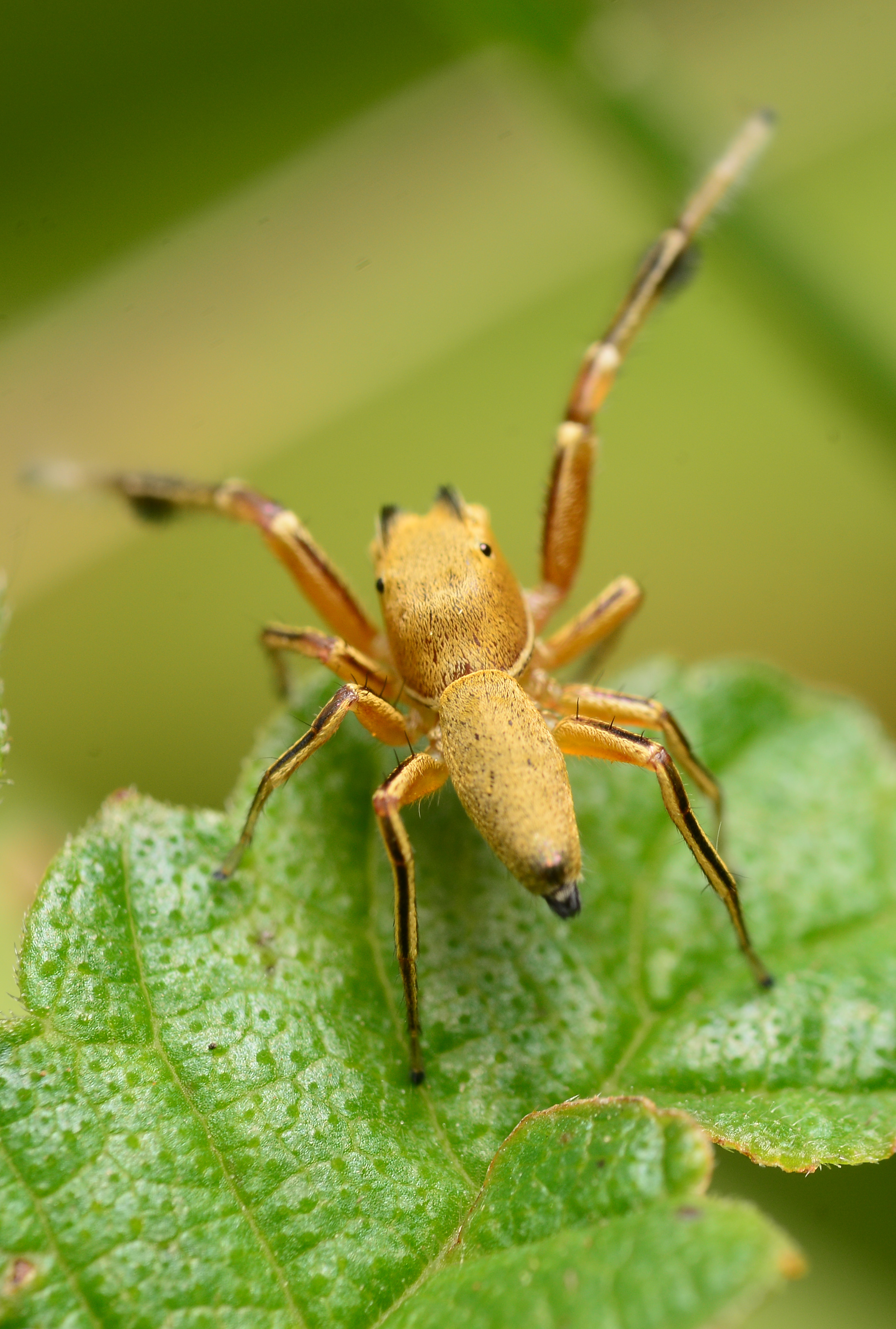
Male side

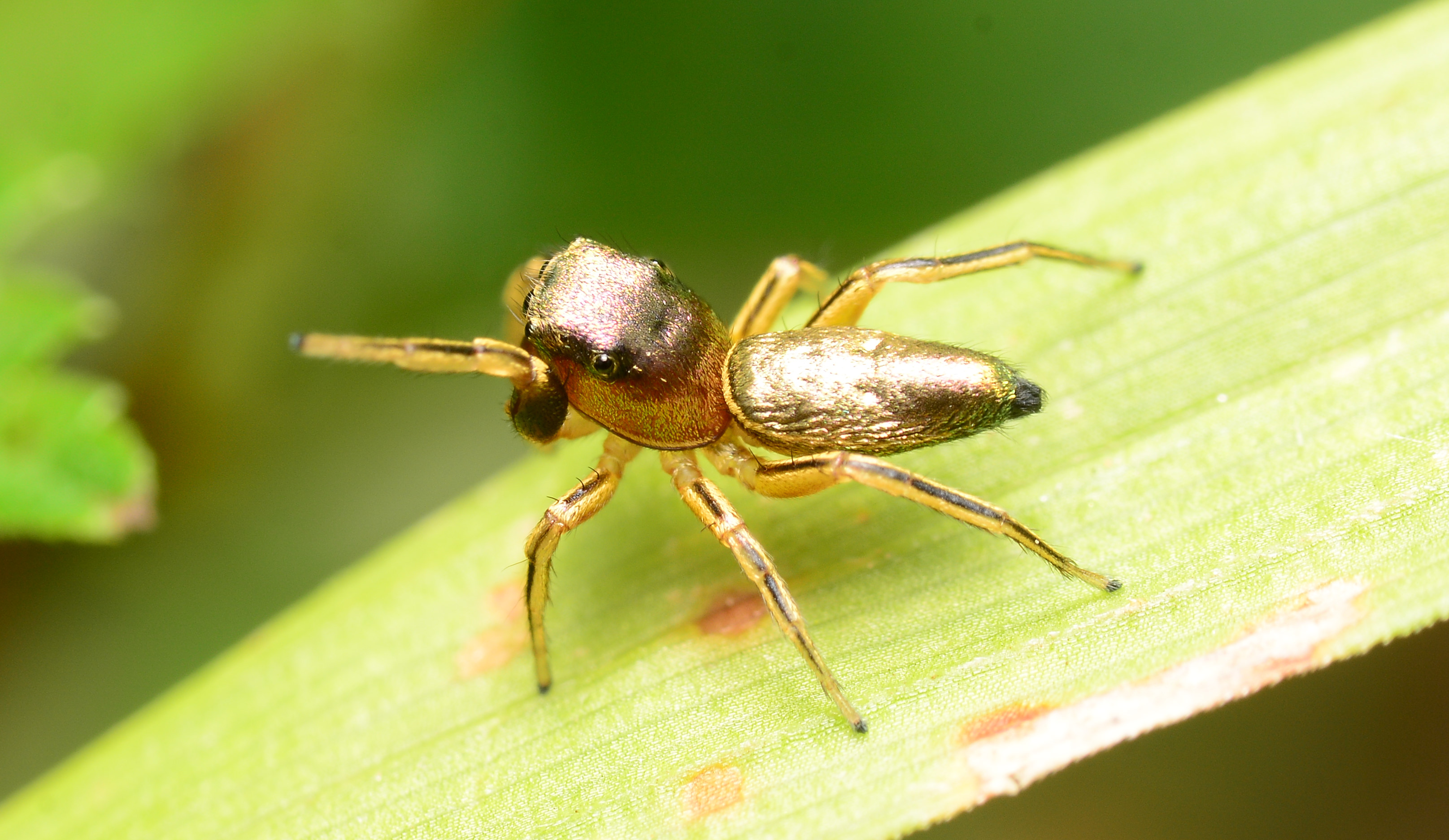
Female dorsal

=== Females ===
The female has a cephalothorax that is about two-thirds as wide as it is long, with sides that are nearly straight and parallel. The opisthosoma is oval-shaped and nearly twice as long as it is wide. The overall coloration is bronze-green, which can appear copper-red under certain lighting conditions. The legs are yellow with dark longitudinal stripes, except for the front femora which are dark brown.

Illustration of female

Illustration of male

=== Males ===
Males are generally more brightly colored than females. The legs are orange, becoming darker toward the ends, with fine dark longitudinal stripes. The tips of the front tibiae are dark brown and feature long brown hairs on the inner and upper surfaces. The pedipalps are orange, darker toward the tips. The sides and posterior portion of the cephalothorax are orange, with a white line over the coxae. The upper part of the cephalothorax and abdomen is covered with greenish-yellow scales. Two tufts of long hairs are present on the front of the head - yellow mixed with black - pointing forward and slightly inward between the middle and lateral eyes. An iridescent purple spot is located at the posterior end of the abdomen. The underside of the abdomen is green, while the sternum and coxae are orange.

The chelicerae are slender with short, strongly curved claws that point inward. In males, the chelicerae are slightly longer and somewhat hollowed on the inner side. Males have the first pair of legs much longer and larger than the others, while in females the fourth legs are the longest.
