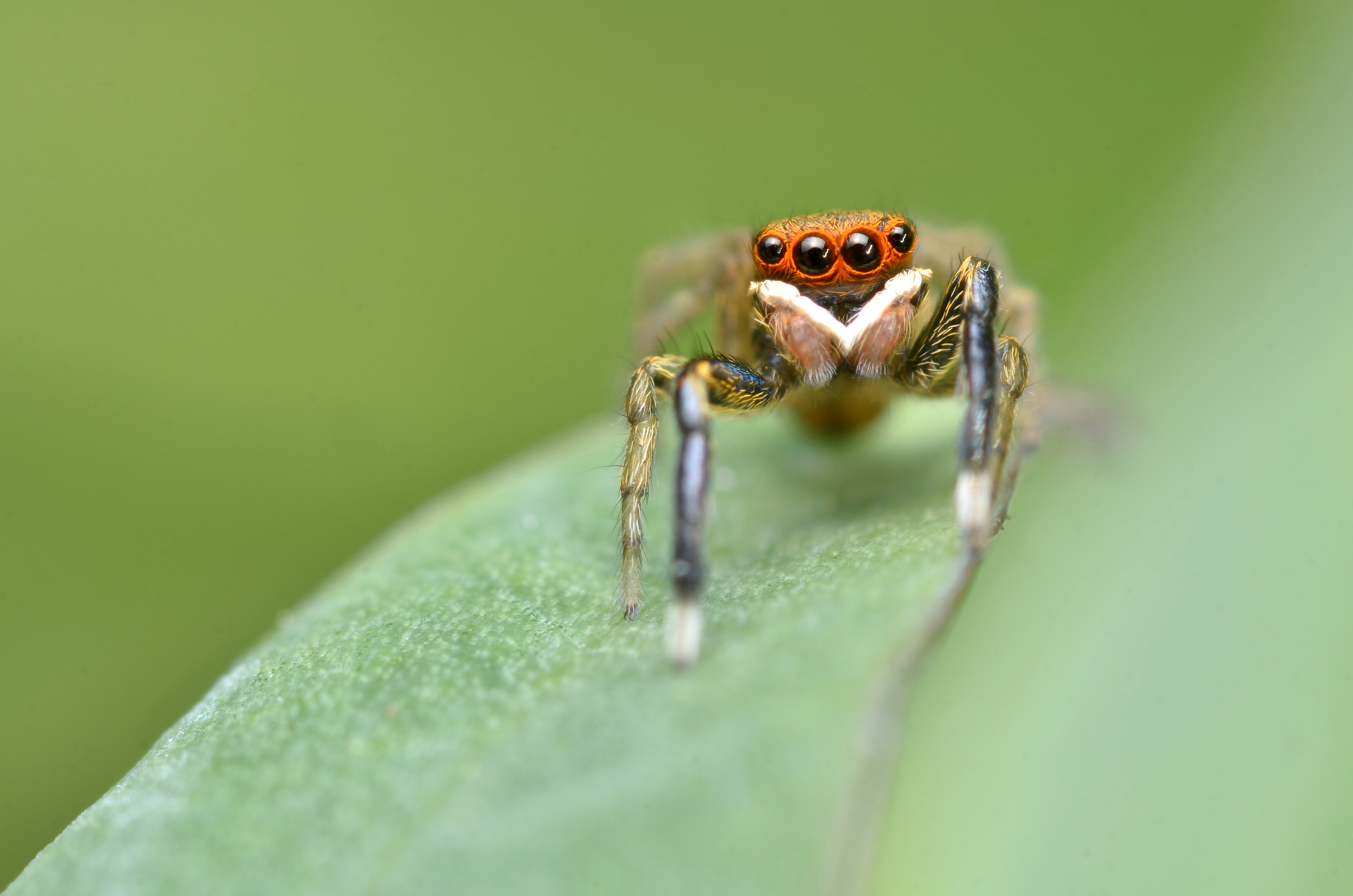
- The related Euophrys frontalis

Scientific classification
- Kingdom: Animalia
- Phylum: Arthropoda
- Subphylum: Chelicerata
- Class: Arachnida
- Order: Araneae
- Infraorder: Araneomorphae
- Family: Salticidae
- Genus: Euophrys
- Species: E. miranda

Binomial name
- Euophrys miranda Wesołowska, Azarkina & Russell-Smith, 2014

= Euophrys miranda =

Species of spider

Euophrys miranda is a species of jumping spider in the genus Euophrys that is endemic to South Africa. The species was first described in 2014 by Wanda Wesołowska, Galina Azarkina and Anthony Russell-Smith. Only the female has been described. It is a very small spider, with a body that consists of a cephalothorax that is typically 1.6 mm (0.06 in) long and an abdomen that is typically 1.4 mm (0.06 in) long. The carapace, the topside of the cephalothorax is dark brown with an even darker eye field. The underside of the cephalothorax, or sternum, is brown. The topside of the abdomen is duller than the carapace and has a pattern of dark and light wavy lines. The underside of the abdomen has four lines of light dots. Its copulatory organs are unique amongst spiders in the genus, particularly its very small receptacles, or spermathecae, and the complex pattern that the very narrow insemination ducts make. This complexity is the reason for the species name, which can be translated "curious".

== Taxonomy ==
Euophrys miranda is a species of jumping spider that was first described by Wanda Wesołowska Galina Azarkina and Anthony Russell-Smith in 2014. They allocated it to the genus Euophrys, which had been first circumscribed by Carl Ludwig Koch in 1934. It was one of over 500 species identified by the Polish arachnologist Wesołowska during her career, more than any other contemporary writer and second only to the French arachnologist Eugène Simon. The genus is named for a Greek word that can be translated "fair eyebrows". The species is named for a Latin word that can be translated "curious".

In Wayne Maddison's 2015 study of spider phylogenetic classification, the genus Euophrys was listed to the tribe Euophryini. First circumscribed by Simon in 1901, the tribe has also been known as Euophrydinae, but the original name is now more prevalent. It is a member of a subgroup of genera called Evophrydeae after the latter name. It is a member of the clade Saltafresia. Analysis of protein-coding genes showed it was particularly related to Thorelliola. In 2016, Prószyński added the genus to a group of genera named Euopherines, named after the genus. This is a member of the supergroup of genera Euphryoida.

== Description ==
Euophrys miranda is a very small spider with a body divided into two main parts: a broad oval cephalothorax and a more rounded oval abdomen. It has a cephalothorax that is typically 1.6 mm (0.06 in) long and 1.2 mm (0.05 in) in width, compared to the abdomen, which is typically 1.9 mm (0.07 in) in length and 1.4 mm (0.06 in) wide. The carapace, the hard upper part of the cephalothorax, is dark brown with slight mottling and a covering of thin translucent hairs on its surface. The eye field is very dark, nearly black. The underside of the cephalothorax, or sternum, is brown. The spider's face, or clypeus, is low and also dark. Its mouthparts, including its chelicerae, labium and maxillae, are also brown. It has two teeth at the front of its mouth and a single tooth to the rear.

The spider's abdomen is larger and less shiny than its carapace. The top has an unusual pattern of wavy lines made of alternative light and dark chevrons on a dark background. The underside is dark and marked with four pale lines that run from the front to the back formed of light dots. The spider has dark grey spinnerets. Its legs are generally light brown, although with a grey hint, with dark hairs and spines. The pedipalps are brown.

The spider has distinctive copulatory organs. Only the female has been described, but this is sufficient to be able to show how the species differs from Euophrys spiders. The female has a larger epigyne that has two large round depressions in the middle. To the rear and on the sides lie the copulatory openings, which are covered by flaps. These lead to very long and thin insemination ducts that form two loops. The spermathecae, or receptacles, are oval and smaller than those found in other species in the genus. As with all member of the genus, the spermathecae have some sclerotization. However, it is their size, and the complexity of the course of the insemination ducts, that is most distinctive of the species and enables it to be distinguished from other members of the genus. It is also the shape of the insemination ducts that inspired the species' name.

== Distribution and habitat ==
Euophrys spiders live across the world, although those found in North America may be accidental migrants and those in Central and South America misidentifications. Euophrys miranda is endemic to South Africa. The holotype was discovered in 2012 in the Stormsriver Forest Nature Reserve, now part of the Tsitsikamma National Park, in Eastern Cape. It was found in leaf litter. The spider thrives in lowland subtropical coastal forests.
