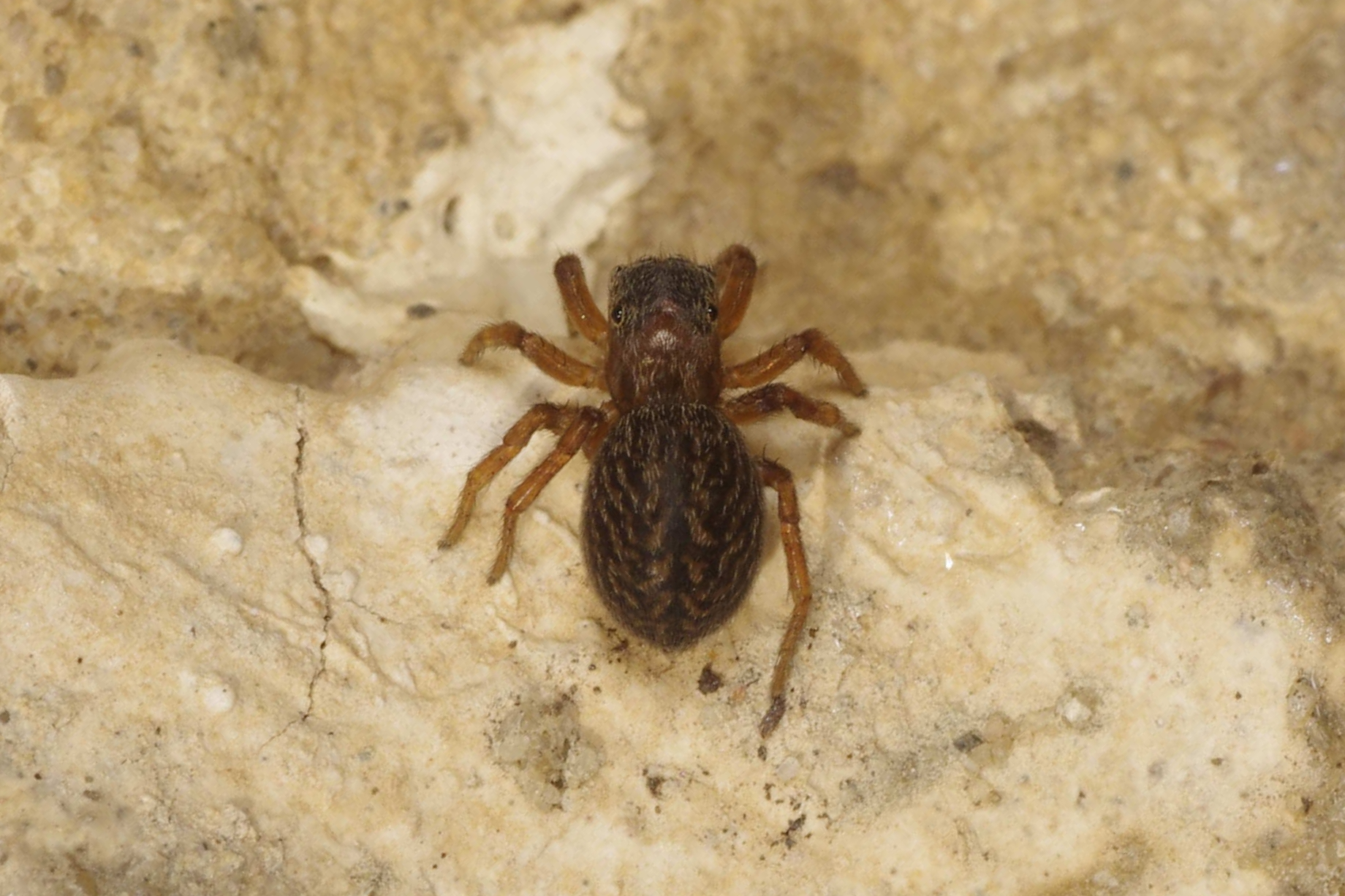
- The related Euophrys frontalis

Scientific classification
- Kingdom: Animalia
- Phylum: Arthropoda
- Subphylum: Chelicerata
- Class: Arachnida
- Order: Araneae
- Infraorder: Araneomorphae
- Family: Salticidae
- Genus: Euophrys
- Species: E. maseruensis

Binomial name
- Euophrys maseruensis Wesołowska, Azarkina & Russell-Smith, 2014

= Euophrys maseruensis =

Species of spider

Euophrys maseruensis is a species of jumping spider in the genus Euophrys that is endemic to Lesotho. The species was first described in 2014 by Wanda Wesołowska, Galina Azarkina and Anthony Russell-Smith. It is a very small spider, with a body that consists of a cephalothorax that is typically 1.1 mm (0.04 in) long and an abdomen that is typically 0.8 mm (0.03 in) long. The spider is generally brown, apart from small features like the white hairs that can be seen on its face, or clypeus, and its greyish spinnerets. The carapace, the topside of the cephalothorax, is darker than the sternum, or underside and, unusually for the genus, a scutum covers the top of the abdomen. Both its legs and pedipalps are also brown. The spider's The copulatory organs are distinctive amongst spiders in the genus, particularly male's thin tibial apophysis, or protrusion on the palpal tibia. The female has not been described.

== Etymology and taxonomy ==
Euophrys maseruensis is a species of jumping spider that was first described by Wanda Wesołowska, Galina Azarkina and Anthony Russell-Smith in 2014. They allocated it to the genus Euophrys, which had been first circumscribed by Carl Ludwig Koch in 1934. It was one of over 500 species identified by the Polish arachnologist Wesołowska during her career, more than any other contemporary writer and second only to the French arachnologist Eugène Simon. The genus is named for a Greek word that can be translated "fair eyebrows". The species is named for the capital of Lesotho, Maseru.

In Wayne Maddison's 2015 study of spider phylogenetic classification, the genus Euophrys was listed to the tribe Euophryini. First circumscribed by Simon in 1901, the tribe has also been known as Euophrydinae, but the original name is now more prevalent. It is a member of a subgroup of genera called Euophrydeae after the latter name. It is a member of the clade Saltafresia. Analysis of protein-coding genes showed it was particularly related to Thorelliola. In 2016, Jerzy Prószyński added the genus to a group of genera named Euopherines, named after the genus. This is a member of the supergroup of genera Euphryoida.

== Description ==
Euophrys maseruensis is a very small spider with a body divided into two main parts: a broad cephalothorax and an oval abdomen. The male has a cephalothorax that is typically 1.1 mm (0.04 in) long and 0.8 mm (0.03 in) wide, The carapace, the hard upper part of the cephalothorax, is dark brown with a very subtle, poorly-developed depression, or fovea in the middle. The eye field is black. The underside of the cephalothorax, or sternum, is brown. The spider's face, or clypeus, is low and dark with some white hairs visible on its surface. The mouthparts are brown and the chelicerae has two teeth at the front and one behind.

The spider's abdomen is an oval that is longer than its carapace, with a length of 1.2 mm (0.05 in), but has a similar width. The top is hairless and covered with a shiny brown scutum and the underside is dark. The spider has greyish spinnerets, while its legs and pedipalps are generally brown. The legs have fine hairs that are colourless.

The spider has distinctive copulatory organs. Only the male has been described, but this is sufficient to be able to show how the species differs from other Euophrys spiders. The palpal bulb is brown and bulbous, with a bulge to its base and a thin embolus that loops around as it emanates from its top. The palpal tibia has a very narrow, but not needle-shaped, protrusion, or tibial apophysis. The narrow tibial apophysis and large embolic disk are key to distinguishing the spider from related species like Euophrys recta. It is otherwise similar to other species in the genus, particularly the type species Euophrys frontalis, but differs in its shorter tibial apophysis and broader embolus, and particularly the way that the embolus loops on a slight angle rather than running straight up.

== Distribution and habitat ==
Euophrys spiders live across the world, although those found in North America may be accidental migrants and those in Central and South America misidentifications. In Africa, they are mainly found in the southern part of the continent. Euophrys maseruensis is endemic to Lesotho. Restricted to a very limited area of the country, the spider thrives in the forests of the afromontane. The holotype has been discovered in 1977 near Molimo-Nthuse living on a boulder in the middle of a stream.
