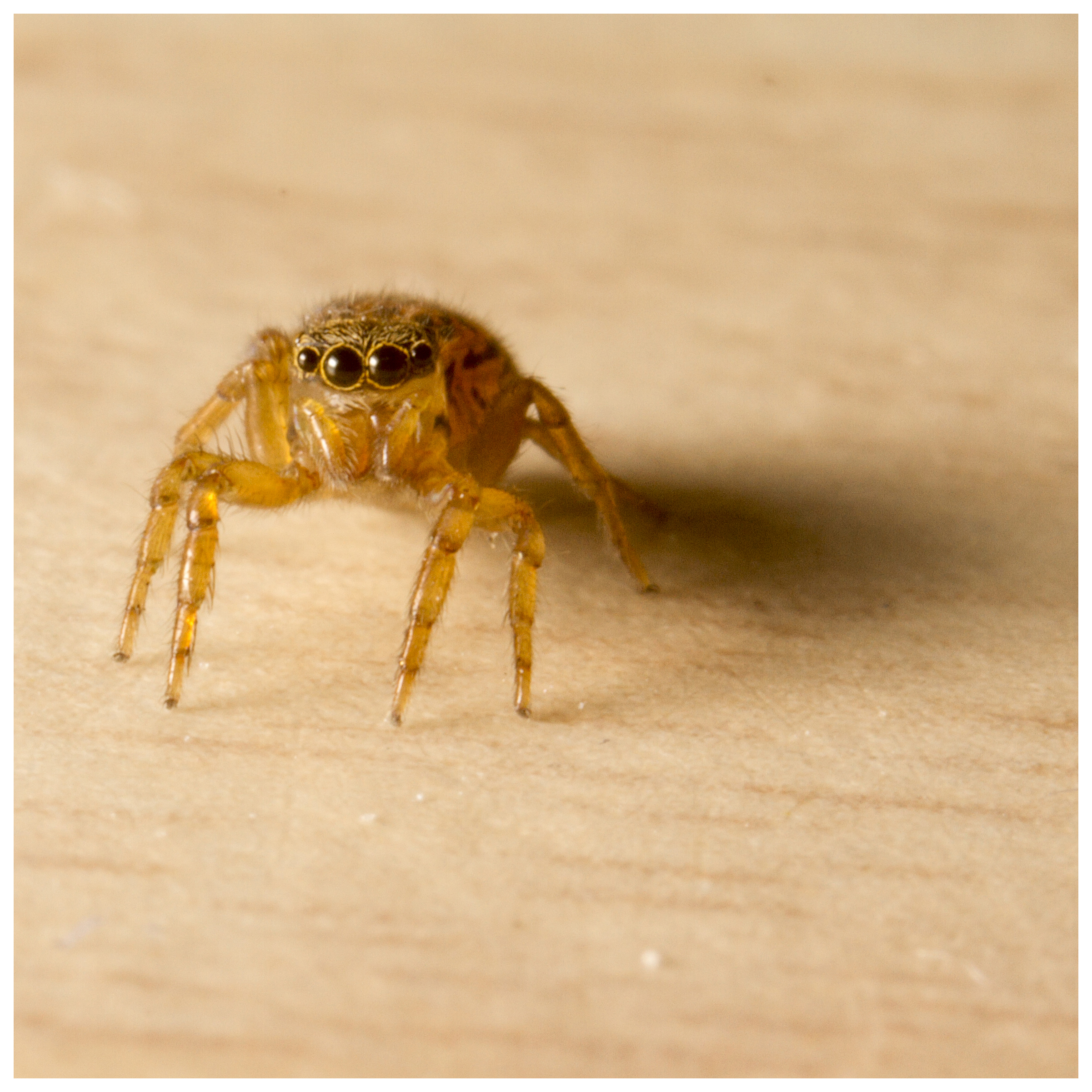
- The related Euophrys frontalis

Scientific classification
- Kingdom: Animalia
- Phylum: Arthropoda
- Subphylum: Chelicerata
- Class: Arachnida
- Order: Araneae
- Infraorder: Araneomorphae
- Family: Salticidae
- Genus: Euophrys
- Species: E. kawkaban

Binomial name
- Euophrys kawkaban Wesołowska & van Harten, 2007

= Euophrys kawkaban =

Species of spider

Euophrys kawkaban is a species of jumping spider in the genus Euophrys that is endemic to Yemen. The species was first described in 2007 by Wanda Wesołowska and Antonius van Harten. It is a very small spider, with a body that consists of a carapace, the hard upper part of the cephalothorax, that is typically 1.7 mm (0.07 in) long and 1.3 mm (0.05 in) wide and an abdomen that is typically 1.5 mm (0.06 in) long and 1.1 mm (0.04 in) wide. The carapace is yellowish, marked with a pattern of brown wedges, with a dark brown eye field. The underside of the cephalothorax, or sternum, is yellowish-brown. The abdomen has a pattern of yellowish-white and brownish-black spots that, at times, look like a series of waves. The spider's clypeus is unusual, being yellowish-brown with a covering of white hairs, which clearly differentiates the species from the related Euophrys flavoater. The male's copulatory organs, including its long and thin embolus, also helps distinguish the species. The female has not been described.

== Taxonomy ==
Euophrys kawkaban is a species of jumping spider that was first described by Wanda Wesołowska and Antonius van Harten in 2007. They allocated it to the genus Euophrys, which had been first circumscribed by Carl Ludwig Koch in 1934. It was one of over 500 species identified by the Polish arachnologist Wesołowska during her career, more than any other contemporary writer and second only to the French arachnologist Eugène Simon. The genus is named for a Greek word that can be translated "fair eyebrows". The species is named the place where it was first found.

In Wayne Maddison's 2015 study of spider phylogenetic classification, the genus Euophrys was listed to the tribe Euophryini. First circumscribed by Simon in 1901, the tribe has also been known as Euophrydinae, but the original name is now more prevalent. It is a member of a subgroup of genera called Evophrydeae after the latter name. It is a member of the clade Saltafresia. Analysis of protein-coding genes showed it was particularly related to Thorelliola. In 2016, Prószyński added the genus to a group of genera named Euopherines, named after the genus. This is a member of the supergroup of genera Euphryoida.

== Description ==
Euophrys kawkaban is a very small spider with a body divided into two main parts: cephalothorax and an abdomen. The carapace, the hard upper part of the cephalothorax, measures typically 1.7 mm (0.07 in) long and 1.3 mm (0.05 in) in width, compared to the abdomen, which is typically 1.5 mm (0.06 in) in length and 1.1 mm (0.04 in) wide. It is yellowish-brown with a thin dark line along its edges and a covering of long bushy hairs on its surface. In the middle is a fovea, which forms the focus for a pattern of ever darkening brown wedges that radiate to the edges of the carapace. The eye field is dark brown with dark bristles, the bristles particularly long near some of the eyes. The underside of the cephalothorax, or sternum, is brownish. The spider's face, or clypeus, is yellowish-brown with a covering of white hairs. Its mouthparts include light brown chelicerae, yellow labium and brown maxillae. It has a single tooth.

The spider's abdomen is smaller than its carapace. It has a top that is yellowish-white with a mosaic pattern of brownish-black spots that join together near the rear into what look like wavy bands. A dense carpet of light hairs cover the whole abdomen, varying from dark brown to white depending on the background, interspersed with longer brown bristles visible on the front edge. The underside is dark and marked with four pale lines that run from the front to the back. The spider has yellow spinnerets, with darker patches visible at their base. Its legs are generally yellow with brown hairs, apart from the first pair, which are mainly black, except for some yellow parts, and have some long black hairs visible on the surface. The pedipalps are brownish-yellow.

The spider has distinctive copulatory organs. The male has a palpal bulb that is rounded and bulbous. The central part of the bulb, or tegulum, has a narrow base and a very narrow embolus emanating from near its top that curls around itself as it projects from the palpal bulb. The tibia is relatively small and smooth with a very straight and thin protrusion, or tibial apophysis. The haematodocha is small. The female has not been described.

Euophrys kawkaban is very similar to other species in the genus, showing very strong similarities in its comparative anatomy. The spider is closely related to Euophrys gambosa, but can be clearly identified by the presence of the tibial apophysis and the colour of the clypeus It also resembles Euophrys flavoater, although the clear difference between the shape of the tegulum and length of the embolus on this spider means that they can still be differentiated.

== Distribution ==
Euophrys spiders live across the world, although those found in North America may be accidental migrants. Euophrys kawkaban is endemic to Yemen. The holotype was discovered in 1998 near the town of Kawkaban, alter which it is named.
