= Eremitarys =

Scientific classification
- Kingdom: Animalia
- Phylum: Arthropoda
- Subphylum: Chelicerata
- Class: Arachnida
- Order: Araneae
- Infraorder: Araneomorphae
- Family: Salticidae
- Genus: Eremitarys; Wang, Yu & Zhang, 2024
- Species: E. fulva

Binomial name
- Eremitarys fulva Wang, Yu & Zhang, 2024

Species of spider

Eremitarys is a monotypic genus of spiders in the family Salticidae containing the single species, Eremitarys fulva.

== Distribution ==
Eremitarys fulva is endemic to Yunnan, China.

== Etymology ==
The genus name is a combination of Latin eremita "hermit" and the related genus Euophrys.
