= Iberattus =

Scientific classification
- Kingdom: Animalia
- Phylum: Arthropoda
- Subphylum: Chelicerata
- Class: Arachnida
- Order: Araneae
- Infraorder: Araneomorphae
- Family: Salticidae
- Subfamily: Salticinae
- Genus: Iberattus; Prószyński, 2018
- Species: I. semiglabratus

Binomial name
- Iberattus semiglabratus (Simon, 1868)

Synonyms
- Attus semi-glabratus Simon, 1868; Phlegra semiglabrata (Simon, 1868); Euophrys lundbladii Schenkel, 1938; Euophrys semiglabrata (Simon, 1868); Habrocestum semiglabratum (Simon, 1868)

Genus of spiders

Iberattus is a genus of jumping spiders (family Salticidae) containing the single species, Iberattus semiglabratus. It was first described by Jerzy Prószyński in 2018, and has only been found in Portugal, Spain, and France. Prószyński separated Iberattus from Euophrys. The justification for doing so has been questioned, since it was based on the examination of a mixed collection of specimens where it was not clear whether the males and females belonged to the same species. Nevertheless, the genus is accepted by the World Spider Catalog as of August 2020.

Prószyński et al. noted that although the male palpal bulb might place the genus in Prószyński's informal group "euophryines", the structure of the female spermatheca was different, leaving its detailed placement uncertain.
