= Euophrys bulbus =

Scientific classification
- Kingdom: Animalia
- Phylum: Arthropoda
- Subphylum: Chelicerata
- Class: Arachnida
- Order: Araneae
- Infraorder: Araneomorphae
- Family: Salticidae
- Genus: Euophrys
- Species: E. bulbus

Binomial name
- Euophrys bulbus Bao & Peng, 2002

Species of spider

Euophrys bulbus is a species of jumping spiders found only in Taiwan. This is a very small spider with a total length (excluding legs) of just over 3 mm. The sparsely hairy carapace is dark brown with black margins and a black w-shaped mark about halfway along the back. The legs are dark brown with greyish-black markings. The roughly cylindrical abdomen is marked generally with short blackish lines with three pairs of light depressions along the back with further light markings, a crescent flanked by diagonal lines, towards the rear.

This species can be distinguished from the similar Euophrys atrata by differences in the shape of the genitalia and the configuration of dentation on the chelicerae.
