= E. terrestris =

E. terrestris may refer to:

- Ettlia terrestris, a synonym of the alga species Chlororustica terrestris, the only species in the genus Chlororustica
- Euophrys terrestris, a jumping spider species
- Euptychia terrestris, a butterfly species
