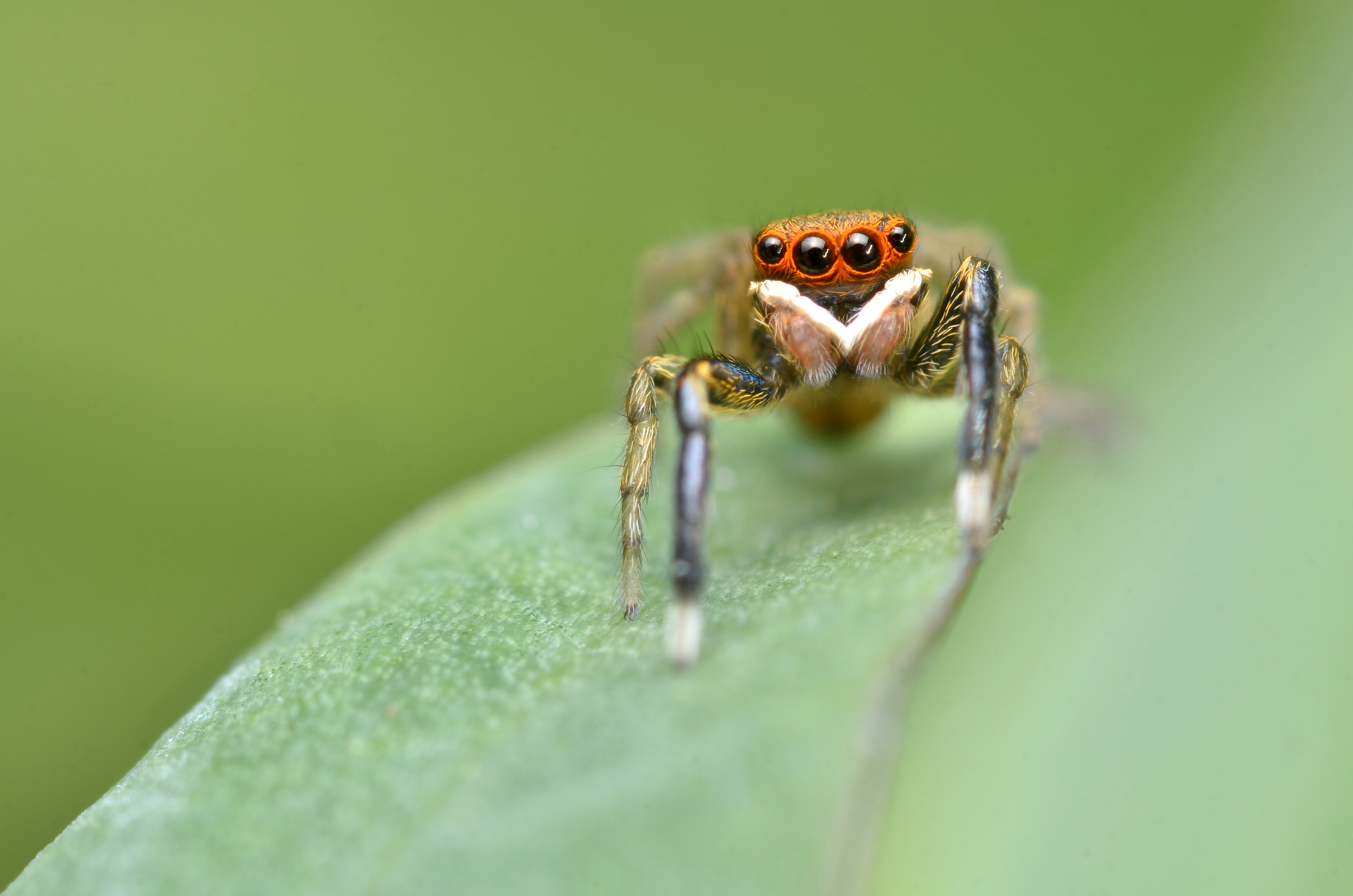
- The related Euophrys frontalis

Scientific classification
- Kingdom: Animalia
- Phylum: Arthropoda
- Subphylum: Chelicerata
- Class: Arachnida
- Order: Araneae
- Infraorder: Araneomorphae
- Family: Salticidae
- Genus: Euophrys
- Species: E. griswaldi

Binomial name
- Euophrys griswaldi Wesołowska, Azarkina & Russell-Smith, 2014

= Euophrys griswoldi =

Species of spider

Euophrys griswaldi is a species of jumping spider in the genus Euophrys that is endemic to South Africa. The species was first described in 2014 by Wanda Wesołowska, Galina Azarkina and Anthony Russell-Smith. It is a very small brown spider, with a body that consists of a cephalothorax that is typically 1.6 mm (0.06 in) long and an abdomen that is typically 1.4 mm (0.06 in) long. The cephalothorax has a darker carapace, or topside and a brown underside, or sternum, while the abdomen is reversed, Its eye field is even darker, nearly black. A hairless scutum covers much of the abdomen. The copulatory organs are also unique amongst spiders in the genus, particularly the long thin embolus on the palpal bulb of the male. The female has not been described.

== Taxonomy ==
Euophrys griswaldi is a species of jumping spider that was first described by the arachnologists Wanda Wesołowska, Galina Azarkina and Anthony Russell-Smith in 2014. They allocated it to the genus Euophrys, which had been first circumscribed by Carl Ludwig Koch in 1934. Its position in the genus was subsequently doubted by Jerzy Prószyński, Jørgen Lissner and Michal Schäfer in 2018, although it has yet to be reclassified to another. It was one of over 500 species identified by Wesołowska during her career, more than any other contemporary writer and second only to the French archeologist Eugène Simon. The genus is named for a Greek word that can be translated "fair eyebrows". The species is named for the arachnologist Charles E. Griswold.

In Wayne Maddison's 2015 study of spider phylogenetic classification, the genus Euophrys was listed to the tribe Euophryini. First circumscribed by Simon in 1901, the tribe has also been known as Euophrydinae and Evophrydinae, but the original name is now more prevalent. It is a member of a subgroup of genera called Evophrydeae after the latter name. It is a member of the clade Saltafresia. Analysis of protein-coding genes showed it was particularly related to Thorelliola. In 2016, Prószyński added the genus to a group of genera named Euopherines, named after the genus. This is a member of the supergroup of genera Euphryoida.

== Description ==
Euophrys griswaldi is a very small light spider with a body divided into two main parts: a broader oval cephalothorax and longer abdomen. The male has a cephalothorax that is typically 1.6 mm (0.06 in) long and 1 mm (0.04 in) wide. The carapace, the hard upper part of the cephalothorax, is moderately high and brown with wide streaks along the sides made of white hairs. The eye field is darker, nearly black, with two white stripes and fawn scales and brown bristles around some of the eyes themselves. The underside of the cephalothorax, or sternum, is a lighter brown. The spider's face, or clypeus, is brown. The chelicerae has two teeth to the front and one to the back, while the remainder of the mouthparts, including the labium, are light brown.

The spider's abdomen measures 1.4 mm (0.06 in) in length and 1.1 mm (0.04 in) in width. The topside is yellowish with a brown strip down the middle and a covering of brown and greyish hairs. There are vague greyish patches on the sides while the underside is yellowish. The spider has brown book lung covers and light yellow spinnerets. The legs are light brown with lights hairs and very long spines,. The pedipalps brownish with a covering of dark hairs, with white hairs on some of the small segments.

The spider has distinctive copulatory organs. Only the male has been described, but this is sufficient to be able to show how the species differs from other Euophrys spiders. The palpal bulb is unusually shaped with a pronounced angular bulge to the bottom and a very thin wiry embolus sprouting from near the top. The embolus follows a distinctive spiral path that loops back to the bulb and loops back to follow and ultimately pass over and around the cymbium. The palpal tibia is small with a complex of angular protrusions and a relatively blunt spike, or tibial apophysis, although it has a more pointed end.. The palpal bulb is similar to Euophrys gracilis but has a smaller palpal bulb and a shorter thinner embolus.

== Distribution and habitat ==
Euophrys spiders live across the world, although those found in North America may have been accidentally introduced by humans and those in Central and South America misidentifications. In Africa, they are mainly found in the southern part of the continent. Euophrys griswaldi is endemic to South Africa. It has been only found in the province of Limpopo. The male holotype was discovered in 2012 in the Magoebaskloof at an altitude of 1,190 m (3,900 ft) above sea level. It was found in leaf litter. Like many species in the genus, it thrives in montane forest.
