= Euophrys capicola =

Cape Euophrys Jumping Spider

Scientific classification
- Kingdom: Animalia
- Phylum: Arthropoda
- Subphylum: Chelicerata
- Class: Arachnida
- Order: Araneae
- Infraorder: Araneomorphae
- Family: Salticidae
- Genus: Euophrys
- Species: E. capicola

Binomial name
- Euophrys capicola Simon, 1901

Species of spider

Euophrys capicola is a species of jumping spider in the family Salticidae. It is endemic to South Africa and is commonly known as the Cape Euophrys jumping spider.

== Distribution ==
Euophrys capicola is found in South Africa, where it is only recorded from an unspecified area around the Cape. Records suggest it occurs in sparsely vegetated areas within this region.

== Habitat and ecology ==
The habitat and ecology of Euophrys capicola are unknown.

== Conservation ==
Placement of the species and its identity are still problematic.

== Taxonomy ==
Euophrys capicola was described by Eugène Simon in 1901. According to Clark in 1974, this species was never formally described and was only mentioned by Simon with a figure of the eyes provided. The male specimen marked as the type in tube No. 20127 of the Museum of Natural History in Paris closely resembles Euophrys purcelli Peckham, 1903. This species should be considered a nomen dubium.
