= Richard Hingston =

British physician, explorer, and naturalist

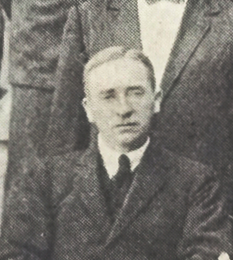
Major Hingston at a meeting in Pusa in 1923

Major Richard William George Hingston MC FRGS (17 January 1887 – 5 August 1966) was an Irish physician, explorer and naturalist who worked in India with the Indian Medical Service. He wrote several books based on his travels and natural history observations. He also served as medical officer to the 1924 British Mount Everest expedition.

== Early life ==
Hingston was born into a middle-class Anglo-Irish family in Blackrock, a suburb of Cork. He was the youngest son of Frances (née Sandiford, c. 1855–1947) and the Reverend Richard Edward Hull Hingston (1859–1924), a Church of Ireland rector, of Aglish, County Waterford. Hingston had two older brothers, James Henry Hingston (1884–1954) and Henry Sandiford Hingston (1885–1956). His six-times great-grandfather, Major James Hingston of Devonshire, was one of Oliver Cromwell's settlers in Ireland. Most of Hingston's early life was spent in the family home at Horsehead in Passage West, County Cork.

He was educated at Merchant Taylors' School in London and at University College Cork. He graduated from the National University of Ireland with first-class honours in 1910, and almost immediately obtained a position in the Indian Medical Service. He secured second place in the I.M.S. examination, among the eminent group which included T. A. Hughes, the physiologist, Clive Newcomb, the research chemist, and Henry Shortt, the parasitologist.

In 1913, he was seconded from military duty as naturalist to the Indo-Russian Pamir triangulation expedition. In 1914 he went on service during the First World War and saw action in East Africa, France, Mesopotamia, and the North-West Frontier, gaining two mentions in dispatches and the Military Cross for gallantry in action.

== Naturalist and author ==
In 1920 he published a book detailing his 1914 & 1916 travels in the Himalayan valley of Hazara, in what is now Pakistan, entitled A Naturalist in Himalaya. He was elected to the Royal Geographical Society on 22 June 1922, proposed by Lt.-Col. Williamson Oswald and seconded by John Scott Keltie.

In 1924, he was appointed medical officer to the Mount Everest Expedition. As a naturalist he collected 10,000 animal samples (insects for the largest part), and 500 plant specimens during the 1924 expedition. Among his finds were a species of spider he discovered living at 22,000 feet (later named as Euophrys omnisuperstes), the highest known habitat for any animal. There he also studied and later published his findings on the effects of high altitudes on the human body in "Physiological Difficulties in the Ascent of Mount Everest", published in the Alpine Journal in 1925. Despite his lack of official mountaineering experience, Hingston was able to come to the aid of Edward Norton at Camp IV when Norton was struck by snow blindness.

From 1925 till 1927, he acted as surgeon-naturalist to the Marine Survey of India on H.I.M.S. Investigator. This post enabled him to conduct new and innovative research which provided rich fields of scientific treasure for several I.M.S. officers such as Alcock and Sewell.

In 1926, Hingston married Mary Siggins Kennedy (1900–1981), of Ashford, Middlesex. In 1927, the couple had a daughter, Maureen Elizabeth (died 1999), who would become a teacher, followed in 1931 by twins Sheelagh "Jill" and Richard George Hingston, both of whom would follow their father in becoming doctors. Hingston's son emigrated to Australia at the age of 20 and served as a medical officer in the Royal Australian Navy, reaching the rank of Surgeon-Lieutenant.

Hingston retired from the Indian Medical Service on pension in 1927 with the rank of Major. He immediately joined the Oxford University Exploration Club expedition to Greenland. In the following year he took command of an expedition sent by the club to British Guiana. His account of the expedition was published in his book A naturalist in the Guiana forest in (1932). He subsequently undertook a mission to Rhodesia, Nyasaland, Kenya, Uganda, and Tanganyika to investigate the methods of preserving the indigenous fauna.

He was recalled to military duty in India in 1939, and remained there until 1946. After the Second World War, Hingston retired to his family home of Horsehead in Passage West, County Cork, where he died on 5 August 1966, at the age of 79. He is buried with his wife and older daughter at St Mary's Church of Ireland in Passage West. Hingston's last surviving child, Jill, continued to live in Passage West until her death in 2023.

Hingston wrote copiously, attractively, and accurately. Although most of his work appeared in scientific journals, he had a number of books to his credit. Most of the specimens he collected are housed at the Natural History Museum in London.

== Books ==
- A naturalist in the Himalaya (London: Witherby, 1920), he told of the spiders, ants, and butterflies of the high valleys;
- A naturalist in Hindustan (London: Witherby, 1923) detailed the lesser fauna of the plains of the United Provinces.
- Problems of Instinct and Intelligence (London: Arnold, 1928).
- The Meaning of Animal Colour and Adornment (London: Arnold, 1933).
- Darwin (Great Lives) (London: Duckworth, 1934).

He also contributed to

- Norton, E.F. The Fight for Everest : 1924 London: Arnold, 1925.

== Arms ==
Coat of arms of Richard Hingston
Notes Confirmed by Sir Arthur Vicars, Ulster King of Arms, 8 July 1903. Crest On a wreath of the colours a demi-lion rampant per pale nebulee Azure and Or holding in its paws a cross pattee of the second. Escutcheon Azure a chevron nebulee Ermine between in chief two lozenges Or each charged with a leopard's face affrontee of the field and in base a cross pattee of the third. Motto Deum Posui Adjutorem
