= Euophrys uphami =

Upham's Euophrys Jumping Spider

Scientific classification
- Kingdom: Animalia
- Phylum: Arthropoda
- Subphylum: Chelicerata
- Class: Arachnida
- Order: Araneae
- Infraorder: Araneomorphae
- Family: Salticidae
- Genus: Euophrys
- Species: E. uphami

Binomial name
- Euophrys uphami (G. W. Peckham & E. G. Peckham, 1903)

Synonyms
- Sittacus uphamii Peckham & Peckham, 1903; Sitticus uphami Prószyński, 1976

Species of spider

Euophrys uphami is a species of jumping spider in the family Salticidae. It is endemic to South Africa and is commonly known as Upham's Euophrys jumping spider.

== Distribution ==
Euophrys uphami is found in South Africa, where it is known from the Western Cape province. Locations include Newlands Forest in Cape Town, Wynberg Caves, Kalk Bay Mountains, and Wynberg.

== Habitat and ecology ==
Euophrys uphami inhabits the Fynbos biome at an altitude of 17 m above sea level.

They are ground-dwellers and the type was sampled from a cave.

== Conservation ==
Euophrys uphami is listed as Data Deficient by the South African National Biodiversity Institute. Some more sampling is needed to collect the female and determine the species' range.

== Taxonomy ==
Euophrys uphami was originally described by G. W. Peckham and E. G. Peckham in 1903 as Sittacus uphamii, with the type locality given only as Cape Colony. The species was later placed in the genus Sitticus by Prószyński in 1976 and considered misplaced in that genus in 1987. Wesołowska transferred it to Euophrys in 2012. The species was redescribed by Wesołowska in 2012, with remarks from Prószyński, Lissner, and Schäfer in 2018.
