= Euophrys marusiki =

Scientific classification
- Kingdom: Animalia
- Phylum: Arthropoda
- Subphylum: Chelicerata
- Class: Arachnida
- Order: Araneae
- Infraorder: Araneomorphae
- Family: Salticidae
- Genus: Euophrys
- Species: E. marusiki

Binomial name
- Euophrys marusiki Wunderlich, 2023

Species of jumping spider

Euophrys marusiki is a species of jumping spider in the genus Euophrys that is endemic to Portugal. It lives in Algarve in proximity to areas where humans live, including gardens near plantations. The spider shows sexual dimorphism, the female being larger than the male, typically 4 mm (0.16 in) in length in comparison to 2.35 mm (0.09 in). The female is also generally darker, nearly black, while the male is brown. The spider's legs also differ, the female having universally grey legs while the male's range from dark brown to yellowish. It is related to Euophrys nigripalpis but differs in its clypeus, which has white hairs in contrast to the other species' red-orange hairs. It also has distinctive copulatory organs, particularly the existence of an outgrowth on the tibia of the male's right pedipalp tibia and the presence of a large 'window' in the female's epigyne.

== Taxonomy and etymology ==
Euophrys marusiki is a species of jumping spider that was first described by Joerg Wunderlich in 2023. He allocated it to the genus Euophrys, which had been first circumscribed by Carl Ludwig Koch in 1834. His decision was based on the similarity of the species to other members of the genus, particularly Euophrys nigripalpis, which is also found on the Iberian peninsula. He also noted how it has similarities to Chalcoscirtus spiders, confirming that the two genera are also related.

The genus Euophrys is named for a Greek word that can be translated "fair eyebrows". Wunderlich gave the spider a specific name in honour of the arachnologist Yuri Marusik. In Wayne Maddison's 2015 study of spider phylogenetic classification, the genus was listed to the tribe Euophryini. It is a member of a subgroup of genera called Euophrydeae after the latter name. It is a member of the clade Saltafresia. Analysis of protein-coding genes showed it was particularly related to Thorelliola. In 2016, Prószyński added the genus to a group of genera named Euopherines, named after the genus. This is a member of the supergroup of genera Euphryoida.

== Description ==
Euophrys spiders are generally small to medium in size, with a body length between 2 and 5 mm (0.08 and 0.20 in). The male Euophrys marusiki is typically 2.35 mm (0.09 in) long. Its body is divided into two main sections, a prosoma, which is 1.45 mm (0.06 in) long and 1.4 mm (0.06 in) wide, and an opisthosoma that is 1.1 mm (0.04 in) long and 0.9 mm (0.04 in) wide. Its prosoma is light brown to the front and dark brown towards the back while its underside, or sternum, is a lighter brown. Its opisthosoma is medium brown and has a very noticeable scutum that is typically 0.63 mm (0.02 in) long and 0.53 mm (0.02 in) wide. Its topsides are hairy and it has white hairs on its clypeus. It has three rows of eyes. Its fore legs are generally darker brown and its hind legs are light brown to yellowish. They have dense long hairs and numerous bristles. Its pedipalps, sensory organs near the mouth, are dark.

The male has distinctive copulatory organs. The right pedipalp has an outgrowth on its tibia that is characteristic of the species. There is also a needle-like spike, or apophysis at the back. The left pedipalp has an egg-shaped cymbium and accompanying paracymbium. The spider's tegulum is slightly narrower than it is wide and has a long embolus that circles around in a coil before it spirals out of the palpal bulb. The tibial outgrowth is similar to the genus Chalcoscirtus.

The species shows evidence of sexual dimorphism. The female is larger than the male with a typical body length of 4 mm (0.16 in) and is darker, nearly completely black apart from a yellow sternum. It has a rectangular prosoma that is one and half times as long and it is wide, typically 1.0 mm (0.04 in) long and 1.45 mm (0.06 in) wide. It has a short clypeus that has white hairs like the male. This is one of the clearest ways that it differs from Euophrys nigripalpis, which has red-orange hairs on its clypeus. Its opisthosoma is also noticeably longer than it is wide, typically 2.3 mm (0.09 in) long and 2 mm (0.08 in) wide. It lacks the male's scutum and the spider's legs are grey, robust and bristly. The female's copulatory organs are also distinctive, particularly the existence of a large 'window' in its epigyne, the external visible part of its copulatory apparatus. Internally, they are very simple. The two copulatory openings lead to relatively short ducts and small spermathecae.

== Distribution and habitat ==
Euophrys spiders live across the world, although those found in North America may be accidental migrants and those in Central and South America misidentifications. Euophrys marusiki is endemic to Portugal. The holotype was found about 4 km (2.5 mi) north east of São Brás de Alportel in Algarve. Other examples have also been found locally. Most Euophrys spiders seem to prefer living in forests. Euophrys marusiki lives in areas of human habitation, although its habitat is threatened by human activity. Specimen were collected in gardens near to plantations, typically in areas with Quercus suber trees.
