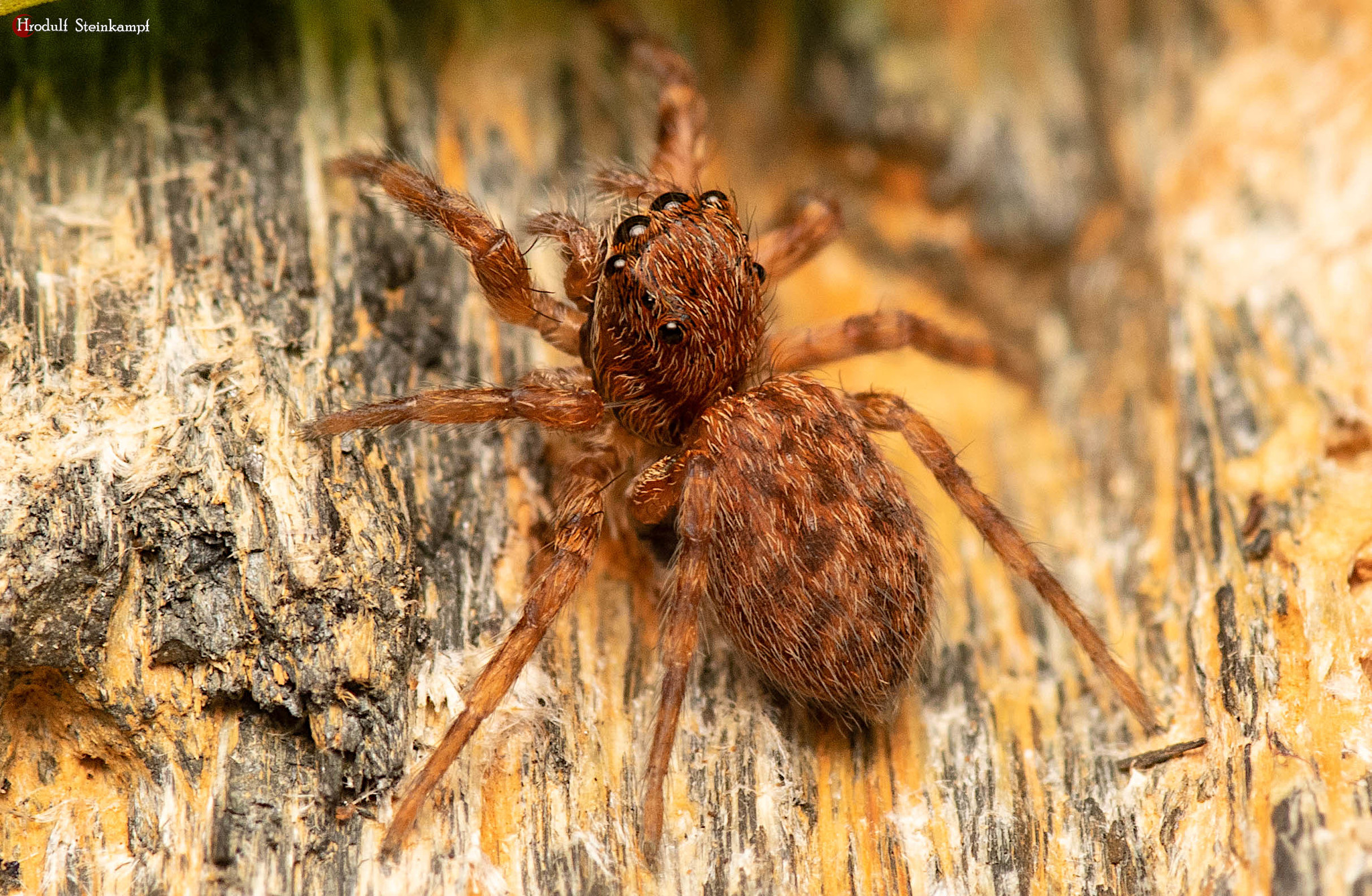
- A mature female from the Kalahari Desert
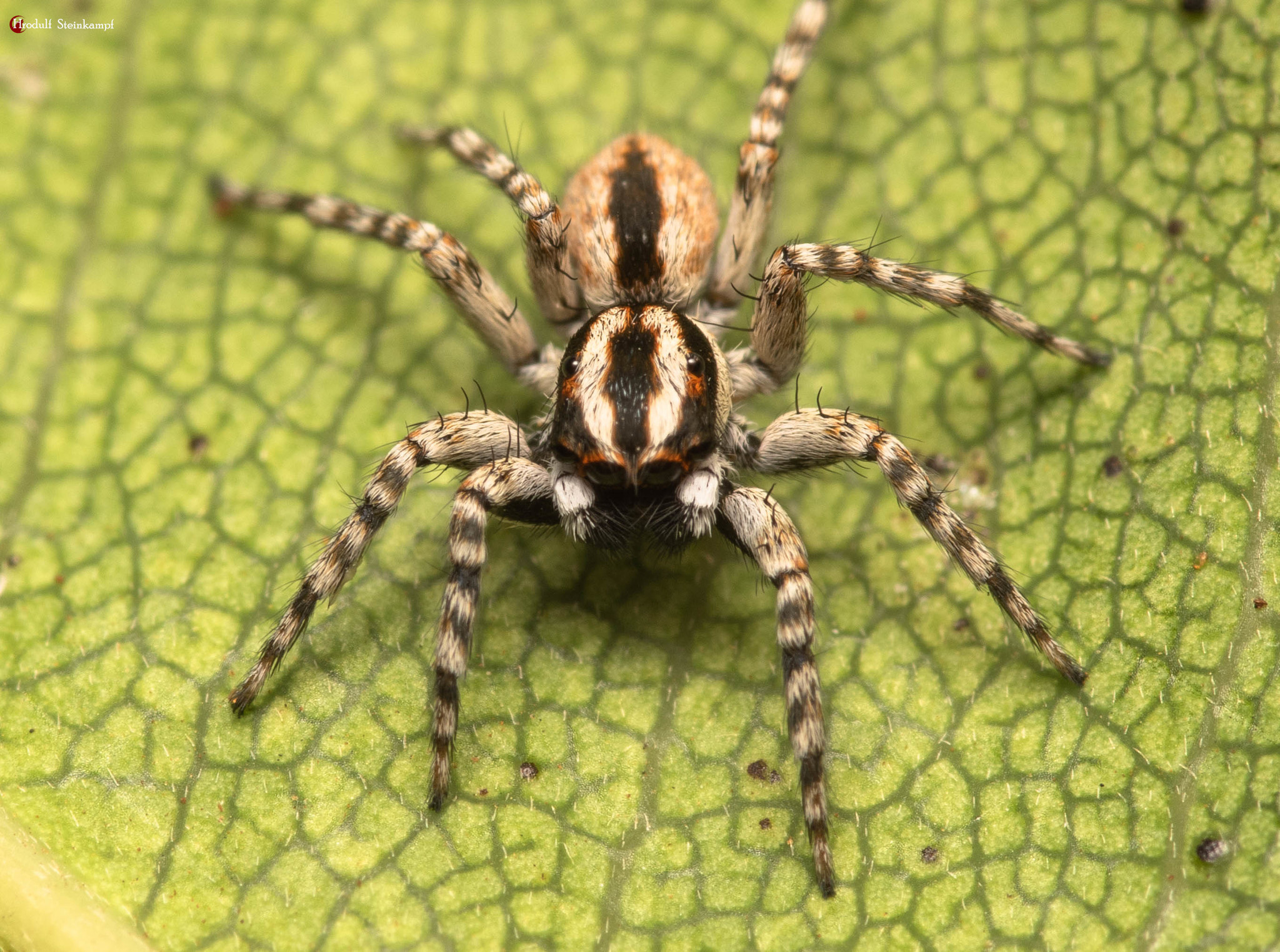
- A mature male from Sendelingsdrift, South Africa

Conservation status
- Least Concern (IUCN 3.1)

Scientific classification
- Kingdom: Animalia
- Phylum: Arthropoda
- Subphylum: Chelicerata
- Class: Arachnida
- Order: Araneae
- Infraorder: Araneomorphae
- Family: Salticidae
- Genus: Euophrys
- Species: E. leipoldti

Binomial name
- Euophrys leipoldti G. W. Peckham & E. G. Peckham, 1903

= Euophrys leipoldti =

Species of spider

Euophrys leipoldti, the Karoo Euophrys Jumping Spider, is a species of jumping spider in the genus Euophrys that is endemic to South Africa. It lives in the Karoo and succulent Karoo. The female was first described in 1903 by George and Elizabeth Peckham and the male in 2014 by Wanda Wesołowska, Galina Azarkina and Anthony Russell-Smith. It is a small spider, with a body that consists of an oval cephalothorax (which contains the head and thorax) that is between 1.9 and 2.1 mm (0.07 and 0.08 in) long and, behind that, a narrower abdomen that ranges between 1.8 and 2.4 mm (0.07 and 0.09 in) in length. The spider is generally yellowish-brown to brown, although some examples have a darker carapace (top part of its cephalothorax). The spider has a mottled pattern on its abdomen. The female has a larger abdomen than the male and, while the male has slightly longer brown front legs, the remainder being yellow, the female has yellowish-brown legs that have brown patches and rings. Its copulatory organs are distinctive. The female has the longest insemination ducts in the genus and the male has an unusual spiral embolus.

== Taxonomy ==
Euophrys leipoldti is a species of jumping spider, a member of the family Salticidae, that was first described by George W. Peckham and Elizabeth G. Peckham in 1903. They allocated it to the genus Euophrys, which had been first circumscribed by Carl Ludwig Koch in 1834. The genus is named for the two Greek words ευ that can be translated to 'fair' and όφρυς that can be translated 'eyebrows'. The species is named for Christiaan Friedrich Leipodt, who found the first examples. It is colloquially known as the Karoo Euophrys Jumping Spider. Initially, the only examples to be described were female. It was not until 2014, a century later, that the male was described by Wanda Wesołowska, Galina Azarkina and Anthony Russell-Smith.

In Wayne Maddison's 2015 study of spider phylogenetic classification, the genus Euophrys was listed to the tribe Euophryini. First circumscribed by Simon in 1901, the tribe has also been known as Euophrydinae, but the original name is now more prevalent. It is a member of a subgroup of genera called Euophrydeae after the latter name, and a member of the clade Saltafresia. Analysis of protein-coding genes showed it was particularly related to Thorelliola. In 2016, Prószyński added the genus to a group of genera named Euopherines, named after the genus. This group is a member of the supergroup of genera Euphryoida.

== Description ==
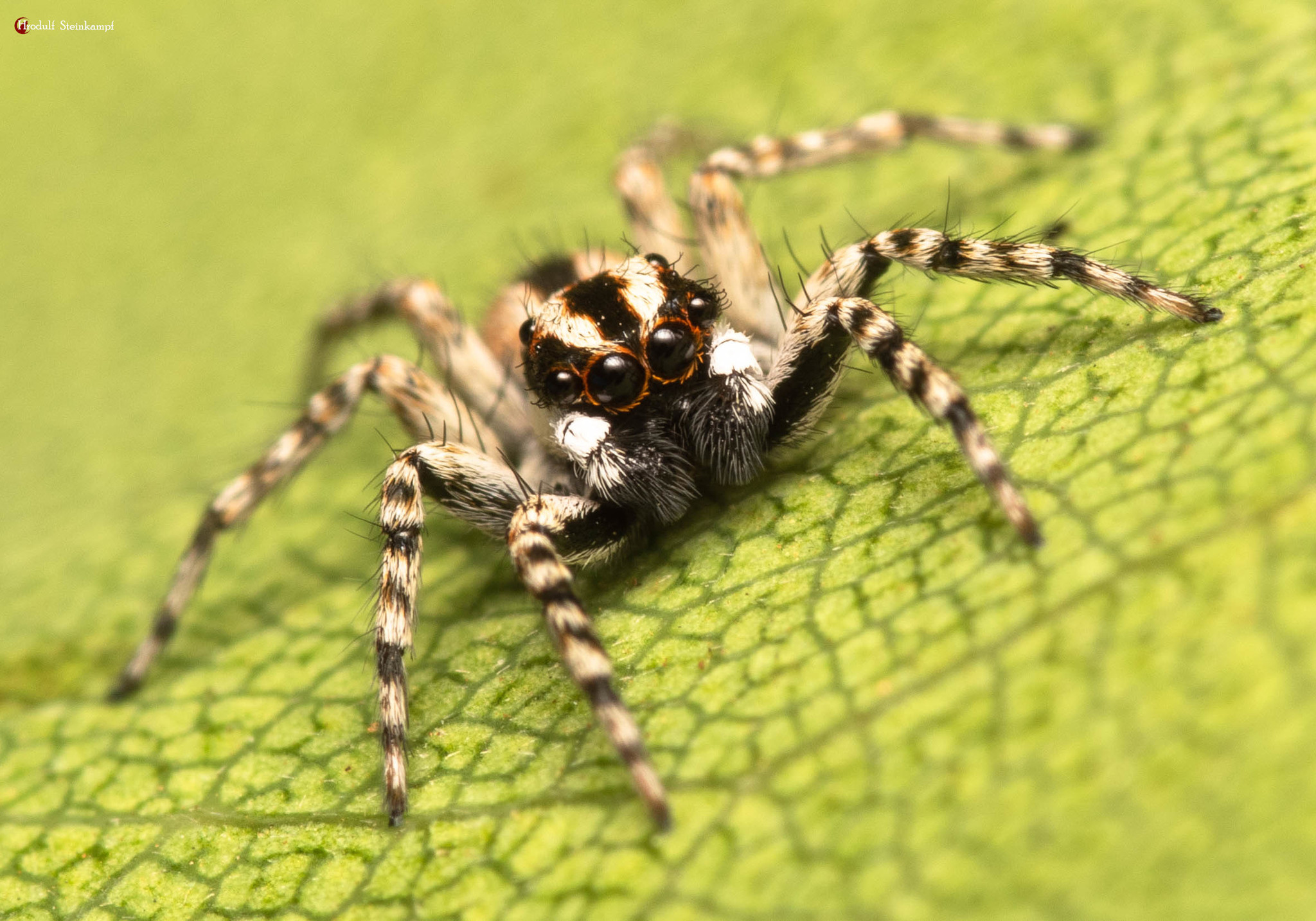
male

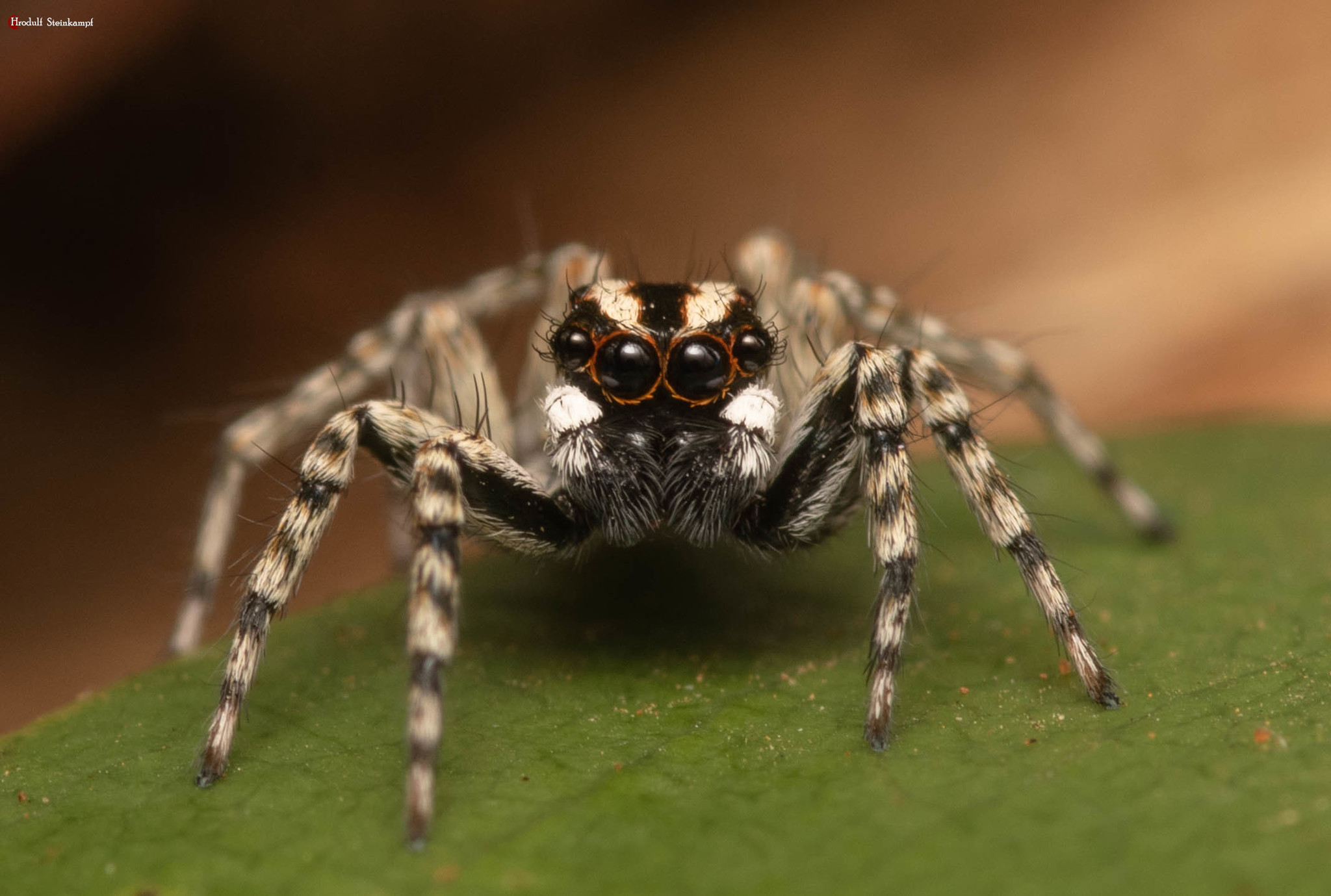
male

Euophrys leipoldti is a small spider with a body divided into two main parts: a larger frontal area or cephalothorax, which contains the head and thorax, and, behind that, a smaller abdomen. The male has an oval cephalothorax that is typically 2.1 mm (0.08 in) long and 1.6 mm (0.06 in) wide. Its carapace, the hard upper part of the cephalothorax, is yellowish-brown to brown and covered in white hairs. The spider's eye field is dark brown or black and covered in brown hairs. There is a thin line of white hairs that run down the middle of the spider's thorax that is crossed with a thicker line. Its sternum, the underside of the cephalothorax, is brownish-yellow. The part of the spider's face known as its clypeus is also yellowish-brown with a scattering of white scales visible on its surface, while its chelicerae are stour and brown, again with small white scales, and have two teeth to the front and one to the back.

The male's abdomen is slightly smaller than its carapace, being typically 1.8 mm (0.07 in) long and typically 1.3 mm (0.05 in) wide. Its top has a mottled pattern of dense brown and white hairs marked with a pattern of darker spots that form a streak across the middle, which itself breaks into a succession of chevrons near the back. In contrast, its underside is light brown. The spider has brownish book lung covers and spinnerets. Its front legs are longer than the rest and generally brown, apart from patches of yellow, and covered in brown hairs. Its remaining legs are yellow and marked with brown rings.

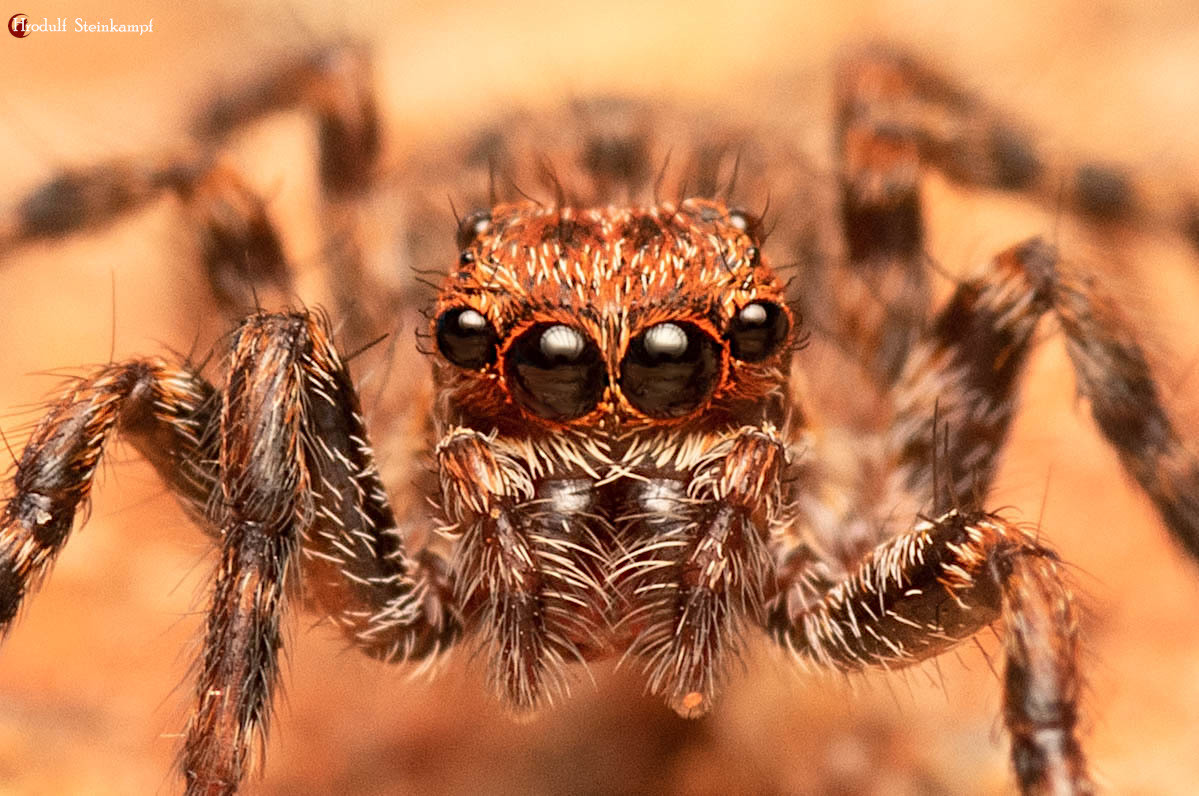
female

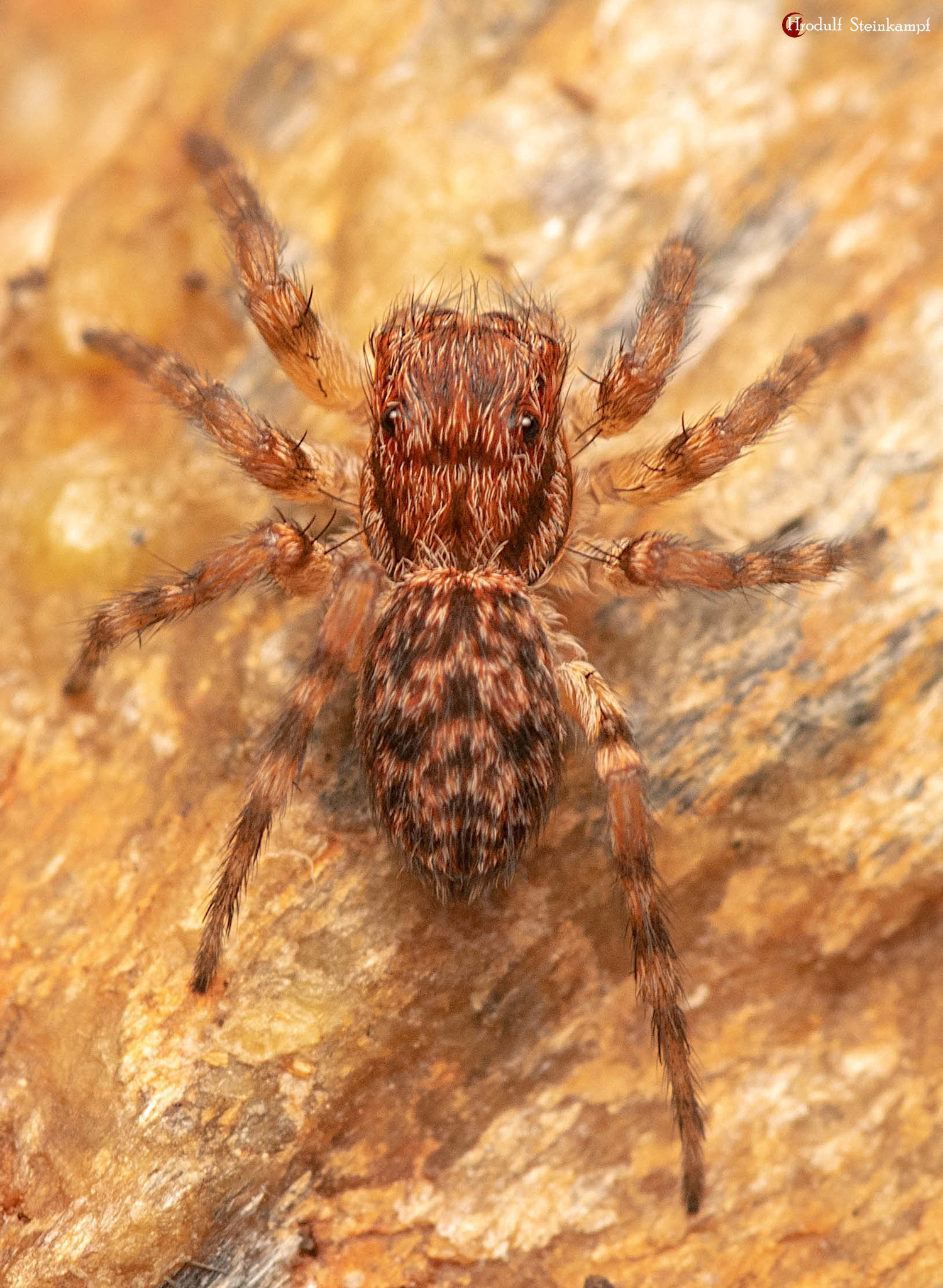
female

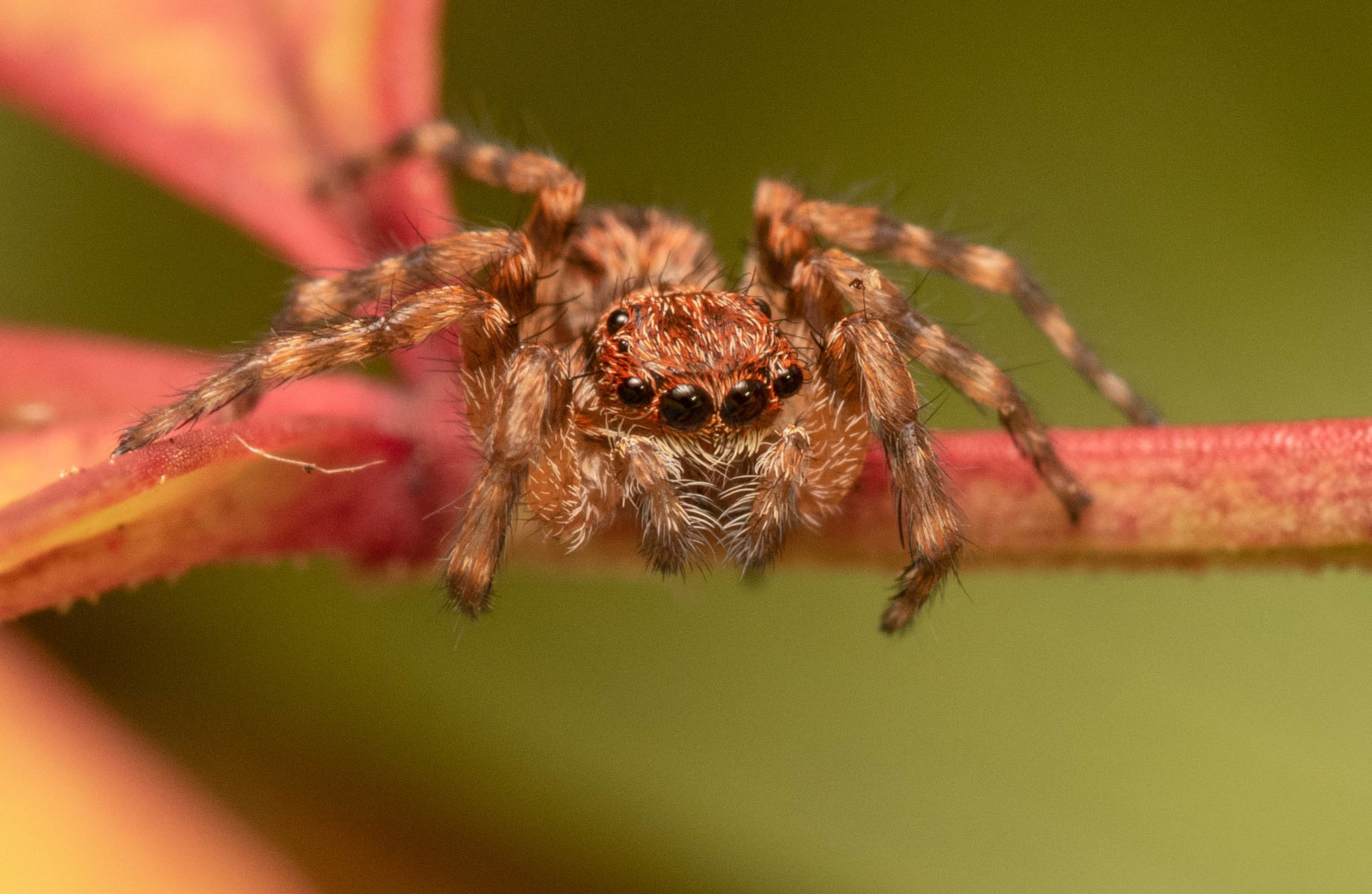
female

The female has a slightly smaller cephalothorax than the male, typically 1.9 mm (0.07 in) in length and 1.5 mm (0.06 in) in width, and an abdomen that is larger, between 2.4 mm (0.09 in) long and 1.8 mm (0.07 in) wide. It has a dark carapace with a pattern of white bands on the edges that extend into the eye field. Some examples have a brown carapace with a darker eye field, covered in dense shiny hairs, and a yellowish-brown sternum. They also have yellowish-brown chelicerae that have a dense covering of white hairs. Its yellowish abdomen is covered in white and brown hairs and has a different pattern to the male, similarly mottled but with a design consisting of small patches. All the legs are yellowish-brown with brown patches and rings. It has a large number of long brown leg spines. In some examples, the legs are covered in white hairs.

The spider has distinctive copulatory organs. The female epigyne has two round depressions near the front and two copulatory openings that are partially hidden by small flaps that lead via very long and looping insemination ducts to bean-shaped spermathecae. The male has brown pedipalps and a yellow cymbium, covered in brown hairs. Brown hairs also cover the palpal tibia, which has a pronounced protrusion, or tibial apophysis, that is larger than other species. The remainder of the copulatory organs have white hairs. Its palpal bulb has a very long and lumpy extrusion at its base and a long embolus that spirals around vertically before curving up and back towards its cymbium. The male differs from Euophrys gracilis in that the embolus is shorter and the palpal tibia lacks a process (an extension of tissue) on its ventral (bottom) side. The length of the insemination ducts, the longest in the genus, help identify the female.

== Distribution and habitat ==
Euophrys spiders live across the world, although those found in North America may be accidental migrants and those in Central and South America misidentifications. In Africa, they are mainly found in the southern part of the continent, Euophrys leipoldti being endemic to South Africa. The female holotype was discovered near Clanwilliam in Western Cape and the first male was seen, in a grouping of three females and six males, in 1985. They were observed in Karoo National Park at an altitude of 1,200 m (3,900 ft) above sea level. Other examples have been found in Northern Cape, including eight females and five males identified in Kgalagadi Transfrontier Park in 1987.

Most Euophrys spiders seem to prefer living in forests. In contrast, Euophrys leipoldti thrives in the arid environments that prevail in the western side of South Africa and is particularly common in the Karoo and succulent Karoo. Its conservation status is of least concern by the South African National Biodiversity Institute due to its wide geographical range. There are no known threats and it is protected in nine reserves in South Africa.
