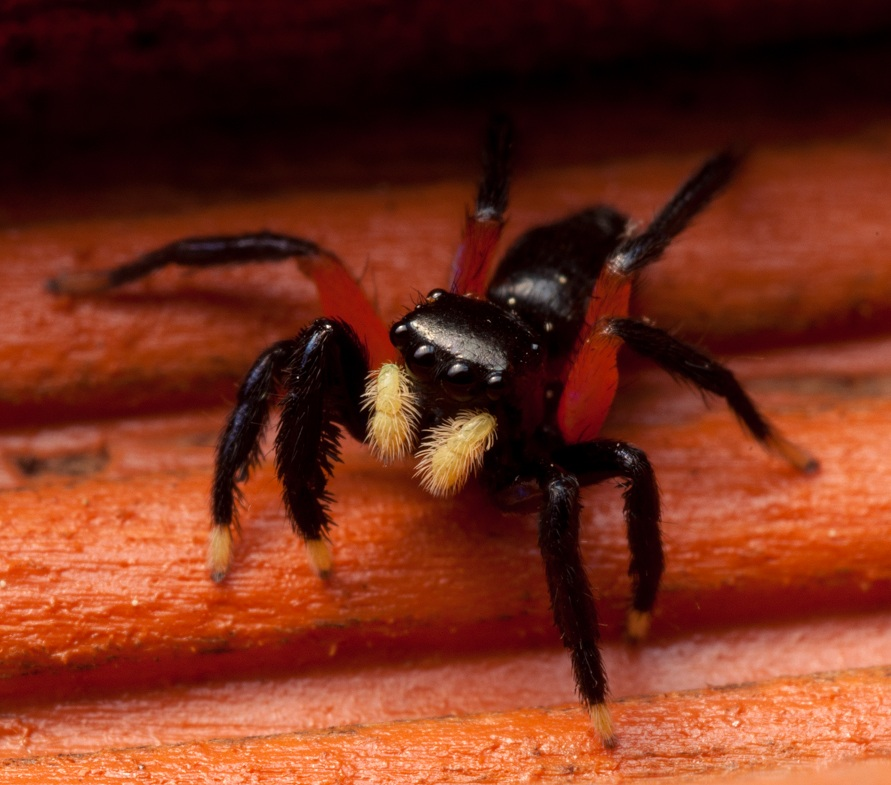
- Male from Val-des-Monts, Quebec

Scientific classification
- Kingdom: Animalia
- Phylum: Arthropoda
- Subphylum: Chelicerata
- Class: Arachnida
- Order: Araneae
- Infraorder: Araneomorphae
- Family: Salticidae
- Genus: Euophrys
- Species: E. monadnock

Binomial name
- Euophrys monadnock Emerton, 1891

Synonyms
- Attus monadnock

= Euophrys monadnock =

Species of spider

Euophrys monadnock is a species of jumping spider which occurs in the United States and Canada. It was first described by James Henry Emerton in 1891.
