= Euophrys menemerella =

Cape Euophrys Jumping Spider

Scientific classification
- Kingdom: Animalia
- Phylum: Arthropoda
- Subphylum: Chelicerata
- Class: Arachnida
- Order: Araneae
- Infraorder: Araneomorphae
- Family: Salticidae
- Genus: Euophrys
- Species: E. menemerella

Binomial name
- Euophrys menemerella Strand, 1909

Synonyms
- Euophrys menemerellus Strand, 1909

Species of spider

Euophrys menemerella is a species of jumping spider in the family Salticidae. It is endemic to South Africa and is commonly known as the Cape Euophrys jumping spider.

== Distribution ==
Euophrys menemerella is known from the Western Cape province in South Africa. Locations include Grootvadersbosch Nature Reserve and Simon's Town.

== Habitat and ecology ==
Euophrys menemerella inhabits the Fynbos biome at an altitude of 10 m above sea level.

== Conservation ==
Euophrys menemerella is listed as Data Deficient by the South African National Biodiversity Institute. Some more sampling is needed to collect the male and determine the species' range.

== Taxonomy ==
Euophrys menemerella was described by Embrik Strand in 1909 from Simon's Town. The species is only known from the female and has not been revised. Jerzy Prószyński added some remarks in 1987, and Prószyński, Lissner, and Schäfer provided additional remarks in 2018.
