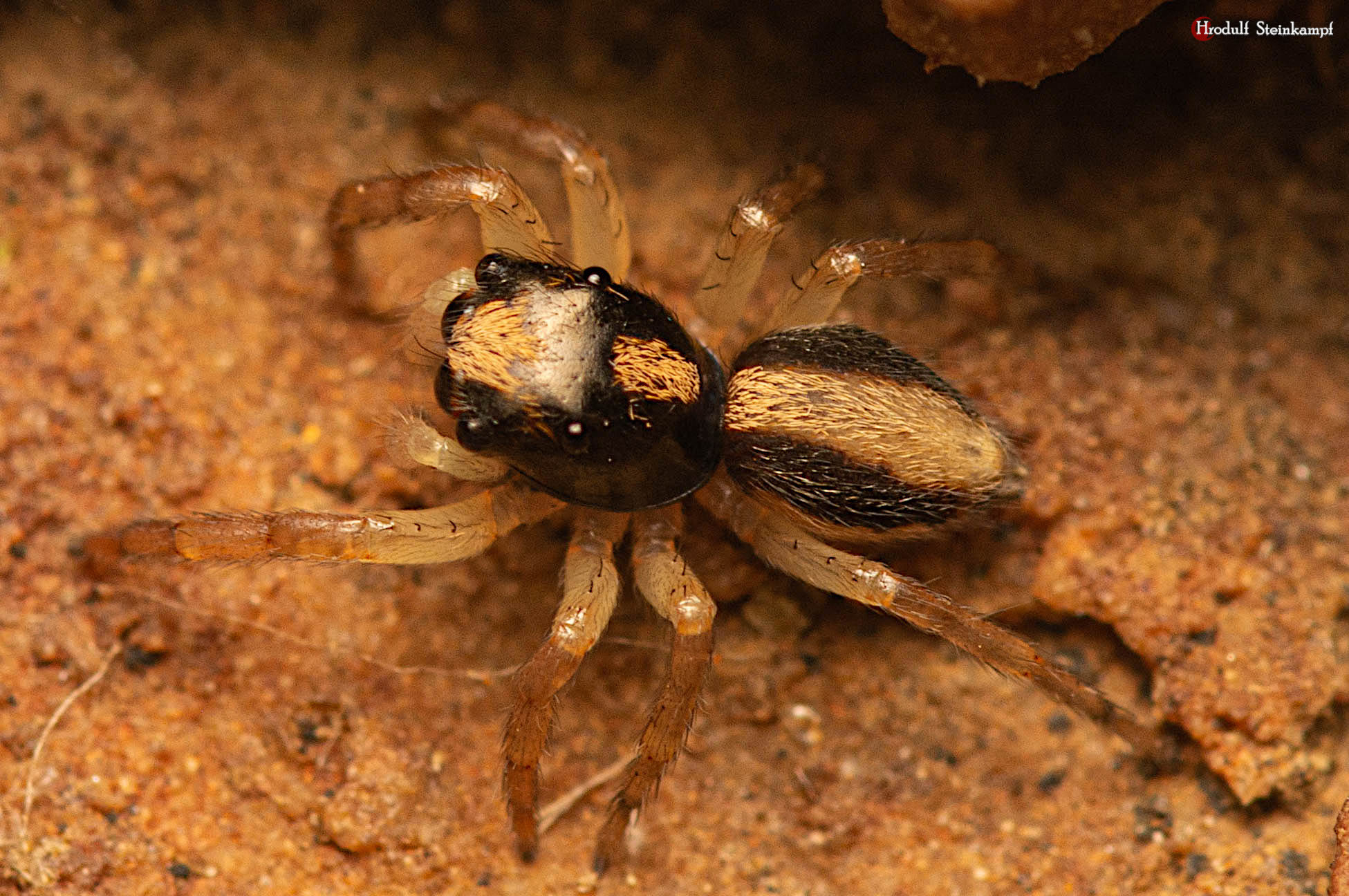
- A male Euophrys cochlea identified in Garden Route District Municipality
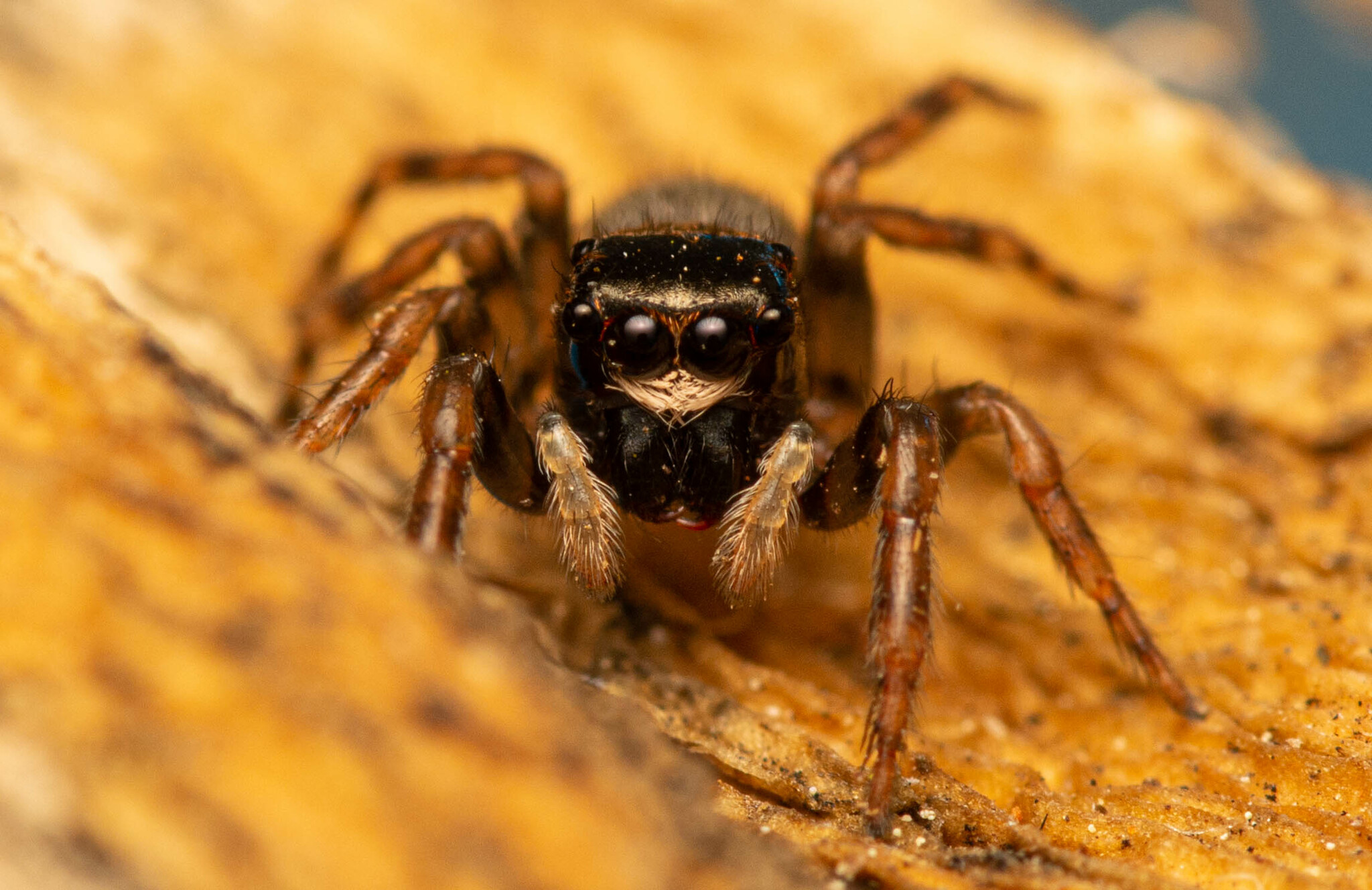
- A female from the same locality

Scientific classification
- Kingdom: Animalia
- Phylum: Arthropoda
- Subphylum: Chelicerata
- Class: Arachnida
- Order: Araneae
- Infraorder: Araneomorphae
- Family: Salticidae
- Genus: Euophrys
- Species: E. cochlea

Binomial name
- Euophrys cochlea Wesołowska, Azarkina & Russell-Smith, 2014

= Euophrys cochlea =

Species of jumping spider

Euophrys cochlea is a species of jumping spider in the genus Euophrys that is endemic to South Africa. The species was first described in 2014 by Wanda Wesołowska, Galina Azarkina and Anthony Russell-Smith. It is a medium-sized brown spider, with a body that consists of a cephalothorax that is between 1.7 and 2.4 mm (0.07 and 0.09 in) long and an abdomen between 1.7 and 2.9 mm (0.11 in) long. The cephalothorax has a dark brown carapace, or topside. The spider's eye field is darker, with black rings around the eyes but marked with a white patch. The female has a yellowish-brown abdomen while the male is a darker brown. While the female has light brown to yellow legs, the male's legs whitish-yellow or yellowish-orange. The spider is most easily differentiated from others species in the genus by its screw-like embolus, part of the male's copulatory organs. This is recalled in the species name, the Latin word for 'screw'.

== Taxonomy and etymology ==
Euophrys cochlea is a species of jumping spider, a member of the family Salticidae, that was first described by the arachnologists Wanda Wesołowska, Galina Azarkina and Anthony Russell-Smith in 2014. They allocated it to the genus Euophrys, which had been first circumscribed by Carl Ludwig Koch in 1834. It was one of over 500 species identified by Wesołowska during her career, more than any other contemporary writer and second only to the French arachnologist Eugène Simon. The genus is named for two Greek words, ευ that can be translated to 'fair' and όφρυς that can be translated 'eyebrows'. The species is named from the Latin name for 'screw', recalling the shape of the male's embolus.

In Wayne Maddison's 2015 study of spider phylogenetic classification, the genus Euophrys was listed to the tribe Euophryini. First circumscribed by Simon in 1901, the tribe has also been known as Euophrydinae, but the original name is now more prevalent. It is a member of a subgroup of genera called Euophrydeae after the latter name. It is a member of the clade Saltafresia. Analysis of protein-coding genes showed it was particularly related to Thorelliola. In 2016, Jerzy Prószyński added the genus to a group of genera named Euopherines, named after the genus. This is a member of the supergroup of genera Euphryoida.

== Description ==
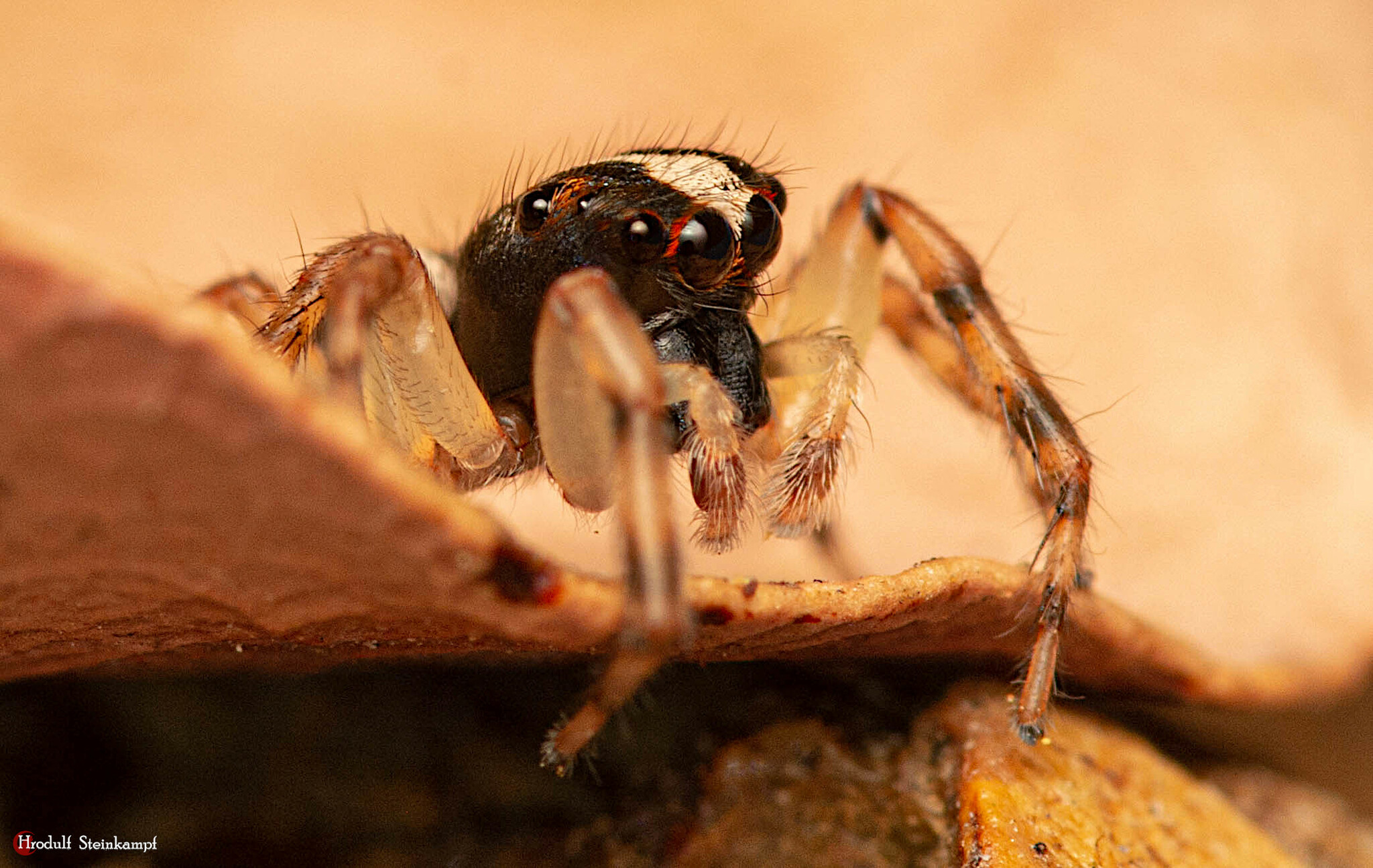
A male

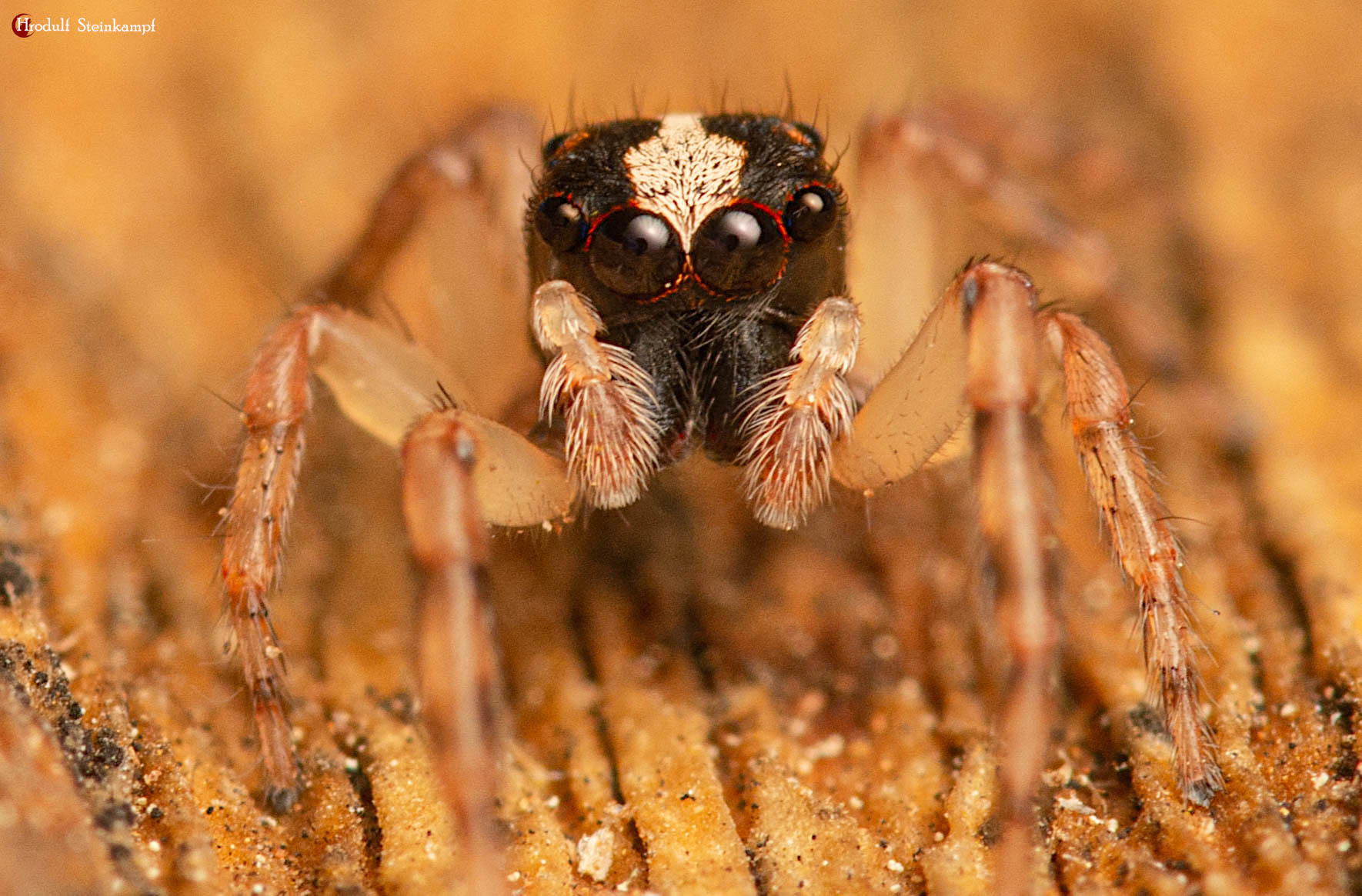
Another view of a male

Euophrys cochlea is a medium-sized spider with a body divided into two main parts: a rectangular cephalothorax and thinner, more oval abdomen. The male cephalothorax is between 1.9 and 2.2 mm (0.07 and 0.09 in) long and between 1.4 and 1.6 mm (0.06 and 0.06 in) wide. The carapace, the hard upper part of the cephalothorax, is high and mainly dark brown with a darker eye field. There are dark rings around the spider's eyes and a large white patch that narrows into a white stripe that finishes towards the back of the thorax. The underside of the cephalothorax, or sternum, is yellow-ish-brown. The spider's clypeus is dark brown, as are the chelicerae, and have a scattering of black hairs and bristles. Behind the fang, the spider has two smaller teeth to the left of its mouthparts and one larger to the right. The spider's labium and maxillae are brown with white tips.

The male spider's abdomen is an oval that is between 1.7 mm (0.07 in) and 2.2 long and between 1.1 mm (0.04 in) and 1.4 wide. The abdomen is brown on top with a wide yellow lead-shaped marking in middle and yellowish brown underneath. There are small dark patches on the side and two indistinct brownish strips on the bottom. The book lung covers and spinnerets are yellow with a hint of grey with two dark spots at the base of the spinnerets. The spider's legs are either whitish-yellow or yellowish-orange with brown leg hairs and light spines. The first pari of legs are longer than the others. The pedipalps are yellowish.

The spider's copulatory organs include a rounded brown palpal bulb with a small bump on the bottom. The cymbium is much larger and hairless. There is a small embolus attached to the top of the palpal bulb that spirals like a screw. The palpal tibia is small and has a relatively long spike, or tibial apophysis.

The female is similar externally to the male. It has a cephalothorax that is between 1.7 and 2.4 mm (0.09 in) mm long and between 1.4 and 1.7 wide. The carapace is dark brown with a yellowish-brown strip down the middle. The eye field is dark brown, nearly black, with black rings around the eyes like the male and a similar light patch. There are additional light hairs near the rearmost eyes. The sternum is yellowish-brown. The clypeus is light brown to yellow and covered with light hairs, amongst which is scattering of brown bristles. The chelicerae are dark brown.

The female abdomen is larger than the male, between 1.9 and 2.9 mm (0.11 in) in length and between 1.3 mm (0.05 in) and 1.9 in width. The top of the abdomen is yellowish-brown with a marking of a serrated stripe running across the middle. The sides are mottled and the underside is yellowish-grey with a brown strip running down the middle. The spider's book lung covers and spinnerets are brownish-yellow, with dark patches under the spinnerets as in the male. The spider's legs and pedipalps are light brown to yellow.

The female has a rounded epigyne with two rounded depressions towards the rear. The edges have limited sclerotization on their rims. It has two copulatory openings that lead to very short insemination ducts and large bean-shaped spermathecae, or receptacles. The male's embolus is unusual and helps distinguish the species from others in the genus, but the female is harder to tell apart.

== Distribution and habitat ==
Euophrys spiders live across the world, although those found in North America may be accidental migrants and those in Central and South America misidentifications. In Africa, they are mainly found in the southern part of the continent. Euophrys cochlea is endemic to South Africa. It has been only found in Western Cape. The male holotype was discovered in 1984 near Knysna in the Lily Vlei Nature Reserve, Gouna State Forest. Other examples have been found across the province. It was found in forests, including those near rivers and in mountains, such as the afromontane. It has been particularly found living in leaf litter.
