= Euophrys omnisuperstes =

Scientific classification
- Kingdom: Animalia
- Phylum: Arthropoda
- Subphylum: Chelicerata
- Class: Arachnida
- Order: Araneae
- Infraorder: Araneomorphae
- Family: Salticidae
- Genus: Euophrys
- Species: E. omnisuperstes

Binomial name
- Euophrys omnisuperstes Wanless, 1975

Species of spider

Euophrys omnisuperstes, the Himalayan jumping spider, is a small jumping spider that lives at elevations of up to 6,700 m (22,000 ft) in the Himalayas, including Mount Everest, making it a candidate for the highest known permanent resident on Earth. They are found among rocky debris, feeding on tiny stray springtails and flies.

The specific epithet means standing above everything, and is from Latin omni ("all") + superstes ("stand over, stand upon, survive").

== Discovery ==
In 1924, Richard Hingston was the naturalist on the British expedition to Mount Everest. In 1925, he reported that spiders had been observed living permanently in rocky areas surrounded by snow and ice at 6,700 m (22,000 ft), about 1,200 m (4,000 ft) above the highest plant growth. His observation that "for food they eat one another" was later described as a "self-defeating notion" and helped to support the view that the spiders had been blown there and were not permanent residents. In 1954, Lawrence W. Swan joined an American expedition to Makalu in the Himalayas, and re-discovered the jumping spiders that Hingston had observed. Swan confirmed that they were indeed permanent residents from 5,500 m (18,000 ft) to above 6,100 m (20,000 ft). When the spider was later described scientifically as Euophrys omnisuperstes, it was found to be the same species as specimens collected by T. G. Longstaff in 1922 (i.e. before Hingston's observations in 1924) around the Everest base camp, at the lower altitude of 5,000 m (16,500 ft).

== Description ==
Euophrys omnisuperstes is a small spider, females having a total body length of about 5 mm (3/16 in), males being slightly smaller at about 4 mm (5/32 in) or less. Both sexes are generally dark brown in colour, with some paler and whitish hairs, and a metallic sheen on the head. Males tend to be darker, the abdomen being described as black rather than brownish-black. The anterior eyes have a fringe of pale and long brown hairs, particularly behind the eyes in females. The eyes are close together and more or less equally spaced. The grooves in which the fangs of the chelicerae rest have two teeth on the outer margin and one on the inner margin. The male's maxillae each have an outgrowth (apophysis) that is absent in females. Accurate identification depends on the shape of the male palpal bulb and the female epigyne.

== Taxonomy ==
Although first collected in 1922 and 1924, Euophrys omnisuperstes was not described scientifically until over 50 years later, in 1975, by F. R. Wanless. The delay was partly because the specimens Hingston collected in 1924 were immature; precise identification of most spiders depends on the genitalia of mature adults. The scientific description was based on Swan's 1954 collection at 5,900 metres (19,500 ft). The specific name omnisuperstes means "standing above all", and was first suggested by W. S. Bristowe.

== Distribution and habitat ==
Euophrys omnisuperstes is found in a small area of the Nepalese Himalayas, on Mount Everest and Makalu, close to the border with Tibet. Here it has been observed in rocky areas free of ice and snow, either on the surface of the rock when the sun is shining or underneath when cloudy. Confirmed specimens have been collected at altitudes ranging from 4,400 m (14,500 ft) to 5,900 m (19,500 ft). The specimens collected by Hingston at 6,700 m (22,000 ft) are assumed to be E. omnisuperstes, but in addition to being immature they are in poor condition.

Euophrys omnisuperstes does not show any obvious adaptations for survival in the extreme conditions of high mountains, being similar to jumping spiders living in more temperate environments. Swan noted that daytime temperatures at high elevations can actually be higher than lower down, because of the reduction in cloud cover and the thinness of the atmosphere. He recorded daytime temperatures at an elevation of 5,500 m (18,000 ft) of 33 °C (92 °F) on rock surfaces and a more constant 16 °C (60 °F) at a depth of 15 cm (6 in), when the shaded air temperature was 13 °C (55 °F). Wanless speculated that jumping spiders' habit of spinning silken cells, in this case beneath rocks, might account for their ability to survive freezing temperatures.

A female jumping spider found in the Dooars region of the Indian state of West Bengal was identified as E. omnisuperstes in 2014, thus extending the distribution to India and to a much lower altitude. Here it occurs in forest litter. Jerzy Prószyński in the Global Species Database of Salticidae regards this record as a misidentification, restricting the distribution to the Himalayas. As of September 2017, the World Spider Catalog notes Prószyński's view, recording the distribution of E. omnisuperstes as "Nepal, India?".

== Ecology ==
Between 18,000 and 20,000 ft (5,500 and 6,100 m) on Makalu, Swan observed that E. omnisuperstes had prey available: flies from the family Anthomyiidae, stalked on rock surfaces in sunny conditions, and springtails (order Collembola), preyed on under rocks when the sun was obscured by clouds. Both kinds of prey feed either on rotting vegetation or on the fungi promoting the rotting. Swan observed that plants and the relevant fungi were limited but still available at these altitudes. Springtails continued to be found even higher, where plants and plant remains were absent. Swan speculated that wind-blown organic debris, including pollen, was supporting the springtails and that they "must surely be present at still higher altitudes", resulting in an ecological system sustained by wind-blown debris.
