= Euophrys terrestris =

Scientific classification
- Kingdom: Animalia
- Phylum: Arthropoda
- Subphylum: Chelicerata
- Class: Arachnida
- Order: Araneae
- Infraorder: Araneomorphae
- Family: Salticidae
- Genus: Euophrys
- Species: E. terrestris

Binomial name
- Euophrys terrestris (Simon, 1871)

Species of spider

Euophrys terrestris is a species of jumping spider.
