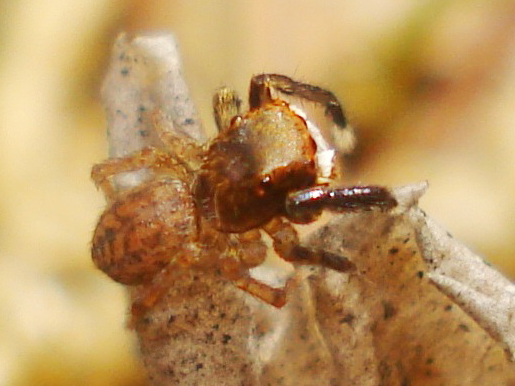
- Euophrys frontalis (Male)

Scientific classification
- Kingdom: Animalia
- Phylum: Arthropoda
- Subphylum: Chelicerata
- Class: Arachnida
- Order: Araneae
- Infraorder: Araneomorphae
- Family: Salticidae
- Subfamily: Salticinae
- Genus: Euophrys; C. L. Koch, 1834

Type species
- E. frontalis (Walckenaer, 1802)

Species
- 99, see text

= Euophrys =

Euophrys Temporal range: Palaeogene– Present

Genus of spiders

Euophrys is a genus of jumping spiders that was first described by Carl Ludwig Koch in 1834. The small black E. omnisuperstes lives on Mount Everest at elevations up to 6,700 meters, possibly making it the most elevated animal in the world. It lives on insects that have been blown upwards.

== Distribution ==
Spiders in this genus are found in Eurasia, Africa and the Americas.

== Description ==
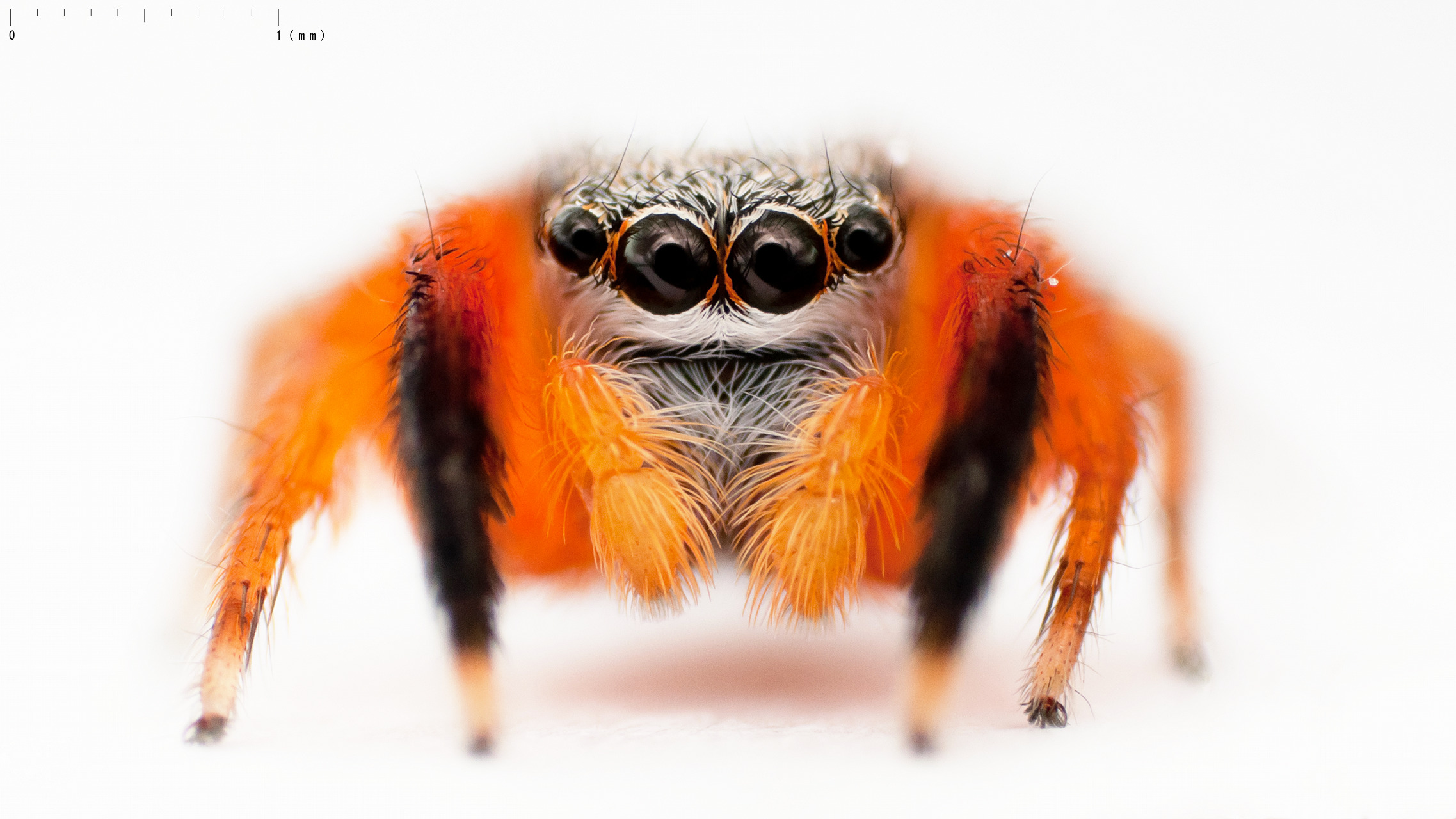
E. kataokai showing large anterior median eyes typical of Euophrys

== Species ==
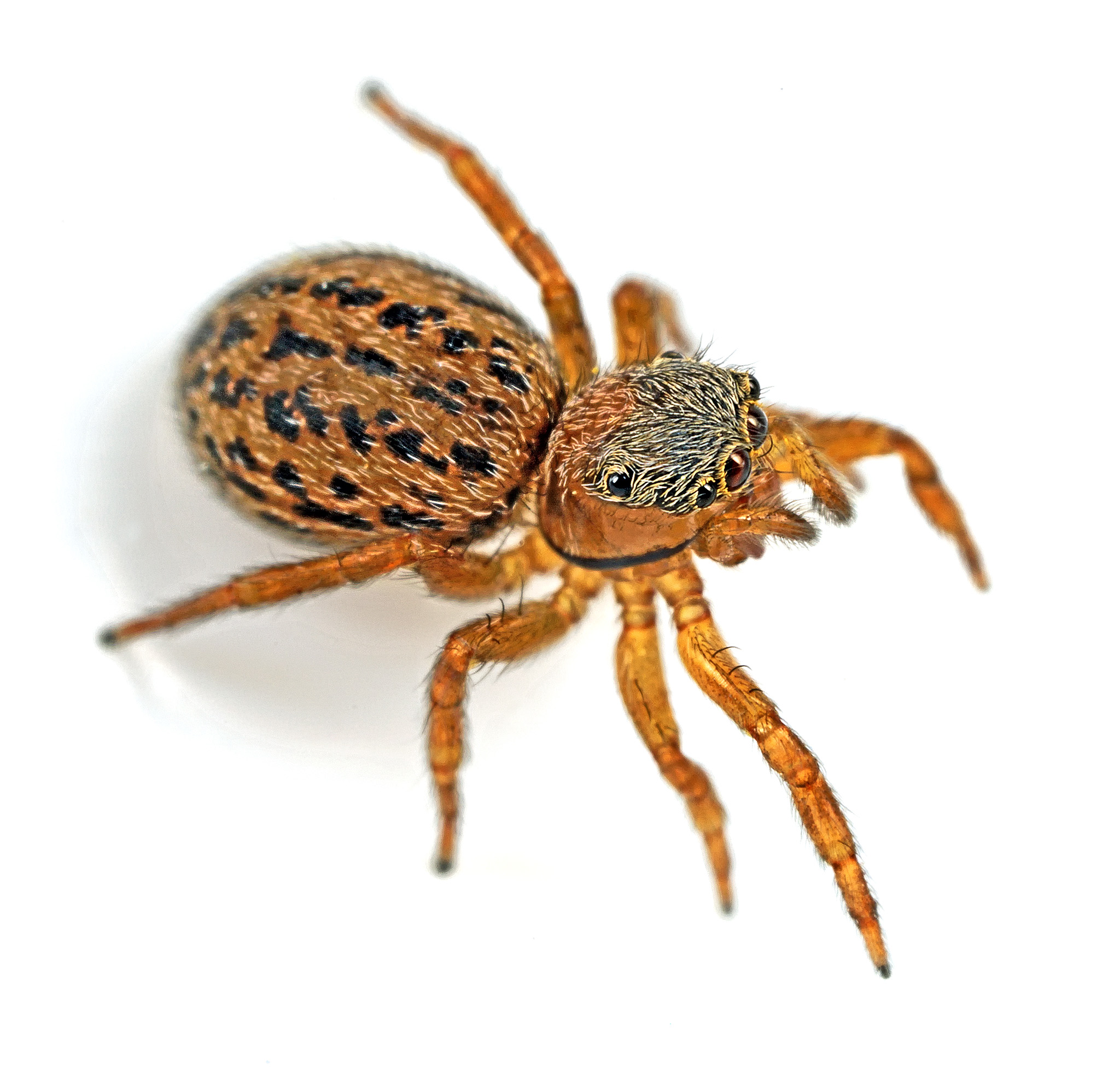
female E. frontalis

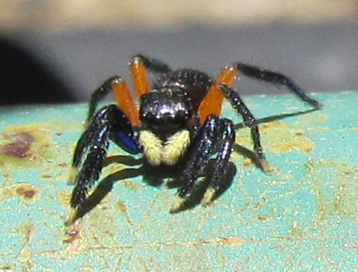
male E. monadnock

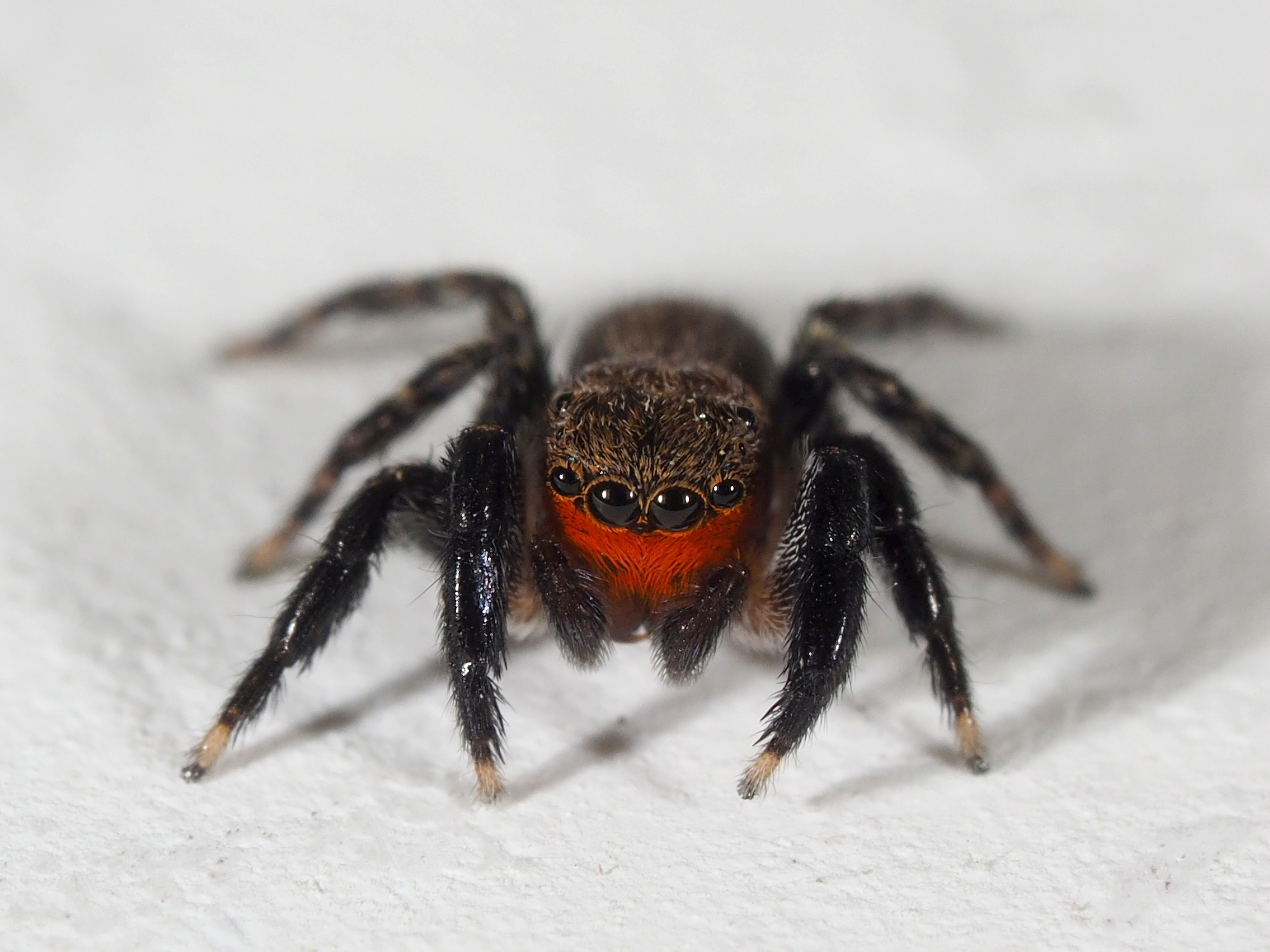
E. rufibarbis

As of October 2025, this genus includes 99 species and one subspecies:

- Euophrys acripes (Simon, 1871) – Spain, France (Corsica)
- Euophrys alabardata Caporiacco, 1947 – Ethiopia
- Euophrys albimana Denis, 1937 – Algeria
- Euophrys altera (Simon, 1868) – Spain
- Euophrys alticola Denis, 1955 – France, Spain
- Euophrys arenaria (Urquhart, 1888) – New Zealand
- Euophrys arnograbollei Schäfer, 2022 – Canary Islands
- Euophrys astuta (Simon, 1871) – Morocco
- Euophrys baliola (Simon, 1871) – France (Corsica)
- Euophrys banksi Roewer, 1951 – Mexico
- Euophrys bifida Wesołowska, Azarkina & Russell-Smith, 2014 – South Africa
- Euophrys bifoveolata Tullgren, 1905 – Argentina
- Euophrys canariensis Denis, 1941 – Canary Islands
- Euophrys capicola Simon, 1901 – South Africa
- Euophrys catherinae Prószyński, 2000 – Egypt
- Euophrys cochlea Wesołowska, Azarkina & Russell-Smith, 2014 – South Africa
- Euophrys concolorata Roewer, 1951 – Pakistan (Karakorum)
- Euophrys convergentis Strand, 1906 – Algeria, Tunisia, Libya
- Euophrys crux Taczanowski, 1878 – Peru
- Euophrys declivis Karsch, 1879 – Sri Lanka
- Euophrys dhaulagirica Żabka, 1980 – Nepal
- Euophrys difficilis (Simon, 1868) – Southern Europe
- Euophrys elizabethae Wesołowska, Azarkina & Russell-Smith, 2014 – South Africa
- Euophrys evae Żabka, 1981 – India (Kashmir)
- Euophrys everestensis Wanless, 1975 – China
- Euophrys falciger Wesołowska, Azarkina & Russell-Smith, 2014 – South Africa
- Euophrys ferrumequinum Taczanowski, 1878 – Ecuador, Peru
- Euophrys flavoatra (Grube, 1861) – Russia (Urals to Far East)
- Euophrys friedmani Marusik, 2019 – Algeria, Israel
- Euophrys frontalis (Walckenaer, 1802) – Europe, Turkey, Caucasus, Russia (Europe to Far East), Kazakhstan, Iran, Central Asia, China, Korea, Japan (type species)
- Euophrys fucata (Simon, 1868) – Turkey
- Euophrys gambosa (Simon, 1868) – Mediterranean
  - E. g. mediocris Simon, 1937 – Southern Europe
- Euophrys gracilis Wesołowska, Azarkina & Russell-Smith, 2014 – South Africa, Lesotho
- Euophrys granulata Denis, 1947 – Egypt
- Euophrys griswoldi Wesołowska, Azarkina & Russell-Smith, 2014 – Namibia
- Euophrys heliophaniformis Dönitz & Strand, 1906 – Japan
- Euophrys herbigrada (Simon, 1871) – Western, Central, Southern Europe
- Euophrys innotata (Simon, 1868) – Western Mediterranean
- Euophrys kataokai Ikeda, 1996 – Russia (Far East), Korea, China, Japan
- Euophrys kawkaban Wesołowska & van Harten, 2007 – Yemen
- Euophrys kirghizica Logunov, 1997 – Kyrgyzstan
- Euophrys leipoldti G. W. Peckham & E. G. Peckham, 1903 – South Africa
- Euophrys leucopalpis Taczanowski, 1878 – Peru
- Euophrys leucostigma C. L. Koch, 1846 – Brazil
- Euophrys limpopo Wesołowska, Azarkina & Russell-Smith, 2014 – South Africa
- Euophrys lunata Bertkau, 1880 – Brazil
- Euophrys luteolineata (Simon, 1871) – France (Corsica)
- Euophrys manicata (Simon, 1871) – Morocco
- Euophrys marmarica Caporiacco, 1928 – Libya
- Euophrys marusiki Wunderlich, 2023 – Portugal
- Euophrys maseruensis Wesołowska, Azarkina & Russell-Smith, 2014 – Lesotho
- Euophrys maura Taczanowski, 1878 – Peru
- Euophrys megastyla Caporiacco, 1949 – Kenya
- Euophrys melanoleuca Mello-Leitão, 1944 – Argentina
- Euophrys menemerella Strand, 1909 – South Africa
- Euophrys meridionalis Wesołowska, Azarkina & Russell-Smith, 2014 – South Africa
- Euophrys miranda Wesołowska, Azarkina & Russell-Smith, 2014 – South Africa
- Euophrys monadnock Emerton, 1891 – Canada, United States
- Euophrys namulinensis Hu, 2001 – China
- Euophrys nana Wesołowska, Azarkina & Russell-Smith, 2014 – South Africa
- Euophrys nanchonensis Taczanowski, 1878 – Peru
- Euophrys nearctica Kaston, 1938 – United States
- Euophrys nepalica Żabka, 1980 – Nepal, China
- Euophrys newtoni G. W. Peckham & E. G. Peckham, 1896 – Central America
- Euophrys nigripalpis Simon, 1937 – Portugal, Spain, France (incl. Corsica)
- Euophrys nigritarsis (Simon, 1868) – France
- Euophrys nigromaculata (Lucas, 1846) – Algeria
- Euophrys omnisuperstes Wanless, 1975 – India, Nepal
- Euophrys parvireceptacula Wunderlich, 2025 – Portugal
- Euophrys patellaris Denis, 1957 – Spain
- Euophrys pelzelni Taczanowski, 1878 – Peru
- Euophrys peruviana Taczanowski, 1878 – Peru
- Euophrys pexa Simon, 1937 – France
- Euophrys proszynskii Logunov, Cutler & Marusik, 1993 – Russia (Central Asia to Far East), Kazakhstan
- Euophrys pseudogambosa Strand, 1915 – Turkey, Israel, Iran
- Euophrys pulchella G. W. Peckham & E. G. Peckham, 1894 – St. Vincent
- Euophrys purcelli G. W. Peckham & E. G. Peckham, 1903 – South Africa
- Euophrys quadricolor Taczanowski, 1878 – Peru
- Euophrys quadripunctata (Lucas, 1846) – Algeria
- Euophrys recta Wesołowska, Azarkina & Russell-Smith, 2014 – South Africa
- Euophrys rufibarbis (Simon, 1868) – Southern Europe, Algeria, Turkey, China
- Euophrys rufimana (Simon, 1875) – France
- Euophrys sanctimatei Taczanowski, 1878 – Peru
- Euophrys sedula (Simon, 1875) – France
- Euophrys semirufa Simon, 1884 – Syria
- Euophrys sima Chamberlin, 1916 – Peru
- Euophrys sinapicolor Taczanowski, 1878 – Peru
- Euophrys subtilis Wesołowska, Azarkina & Russell-Smith, 2014 – South Africa
- Euophrys sulphurea (L. Koch, 1867) – Southern Europe, Turkey, Syria, Algeria? Iran?
- Euophrys taiwanus Chen, Lin & Ueng, 2021 – Taiwan
- Euophrys terrestris (Simon, 1871) – Southern Europe
- Euophrys testaceozonata Caporiacco, 1922 – Italy
- Euophrys turkmenica Logunov, 1997 – Turkmenistan
- Euophrys uphami (G. W. Peckham & E. G. Peckham, 1903) – South Africa
- Euophrys uralensis Logunov, Cutler & Marusik, 1993 – Russia, (Europe)
- Euophrys valens Bösenberg & Lenz, 1895 – East Africa
- Euophrys wenxianensis Yang & Tang, 1997 – China
- Euophrys ysobolii G. W. Peckham & E. G. Peckham, 1896 – Guatemala
- Euophrys yulungensis Żabka, 1980 – Nepal, China
