= Euophrys frontalis =

White-Palped Jumping Spider
- female
- male

Scientific classification
- Kingdom: Animalia
- Phylum: Arthropoda
- Subphylum: Chelicerata
- Class: Arachnida
- Order: Araneae
- Infraorder: Araneomorphae
- Family: Salticidae
- Genus: Euophrys
- Species: E. frontalis

Binomial name
- Euophrys frontalis (Walckenaer, 1802)

Synonyms
- Aranea frontalis Walckenaer, 1802; Salticus rufifrons Blackwall, 1834; Attus striolatus Westring, 1861; Euophrys maculata (Dahl, 1912)

Species of jumping spider

Euophrys frontalis is a species of jumping spider in the genus Euophrys. It has a wide distribution across the Palearctic region, from Europe and Turkey through Russia to the Far East, including China, Korea, and Japan.

== Etymology ==
The species name frontalis is derived from the Latin word frons, meaning "forehead" or "front", referring to distinctive markings on the frontal region of the spider's cephalothorax.

== Distribution ==
E. frontalis has been recorded from Europe, Turkey, Caucasus, Russia (from Europe to Far East), Kazakhstan, Iran, Central Asia, China, Korea, and Japan. In Europe, it has been documented from numerous countries including Greece, Bulgaria, Germany, Sweden, Finland, Poland, and the United Kingdom.

== Habitat ==
Euophrys frontalis inhabits various environments including deciduous and coniferous forests, forest edges, gardens, and parks. The species is often found on low vegetation, bushes, and tree trunks, where it actively hunts for prey.

== Description ==
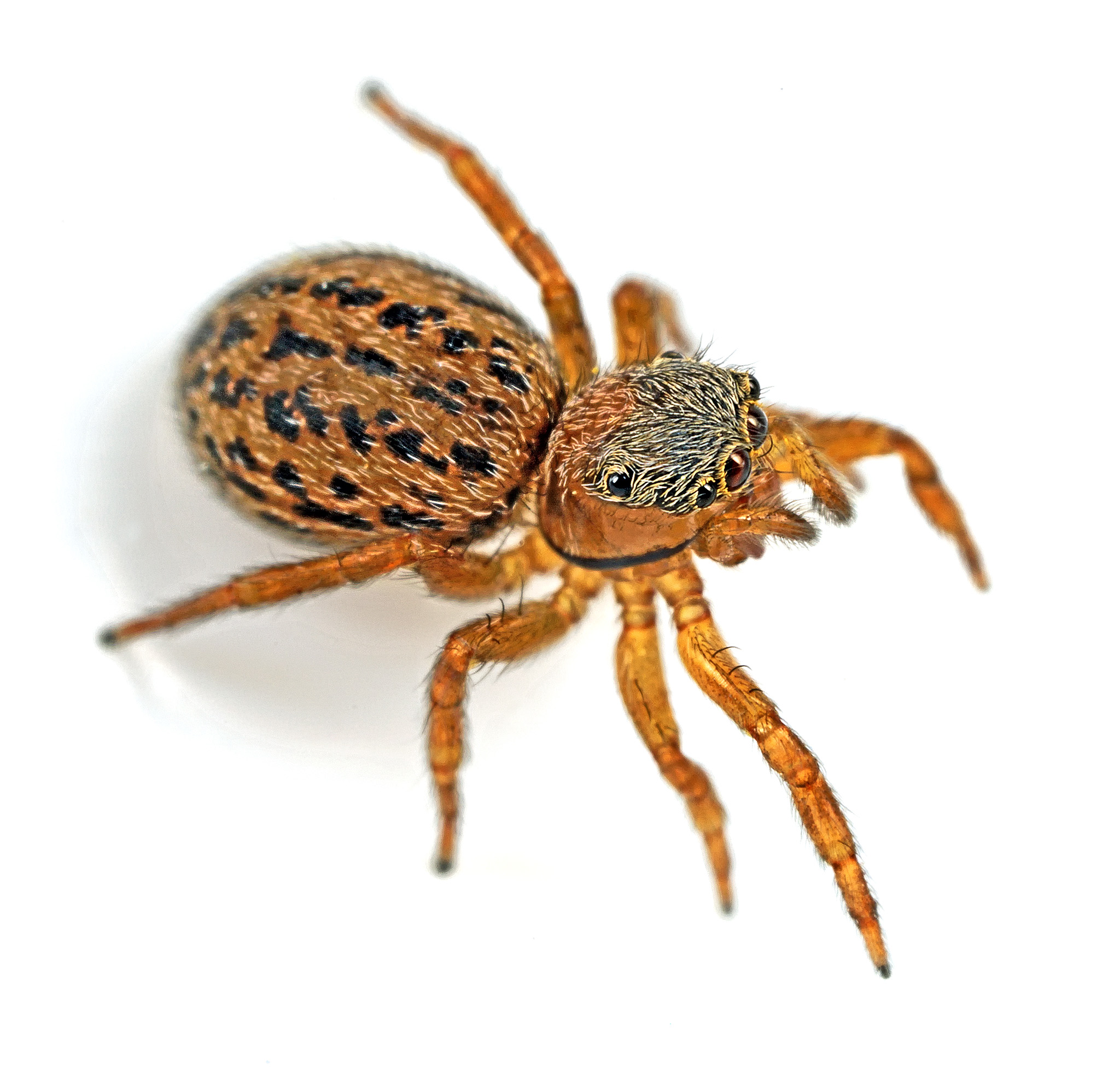
female

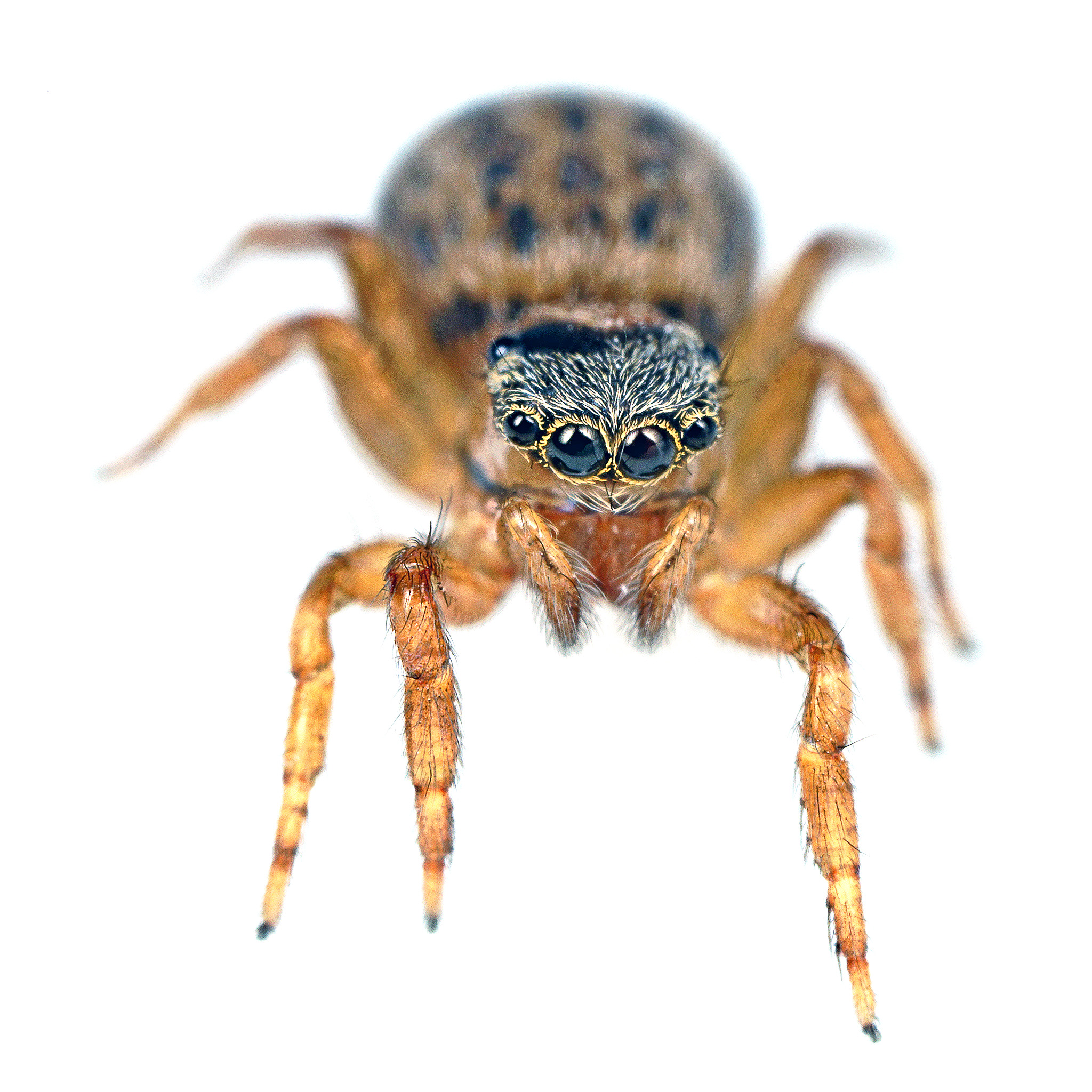
female

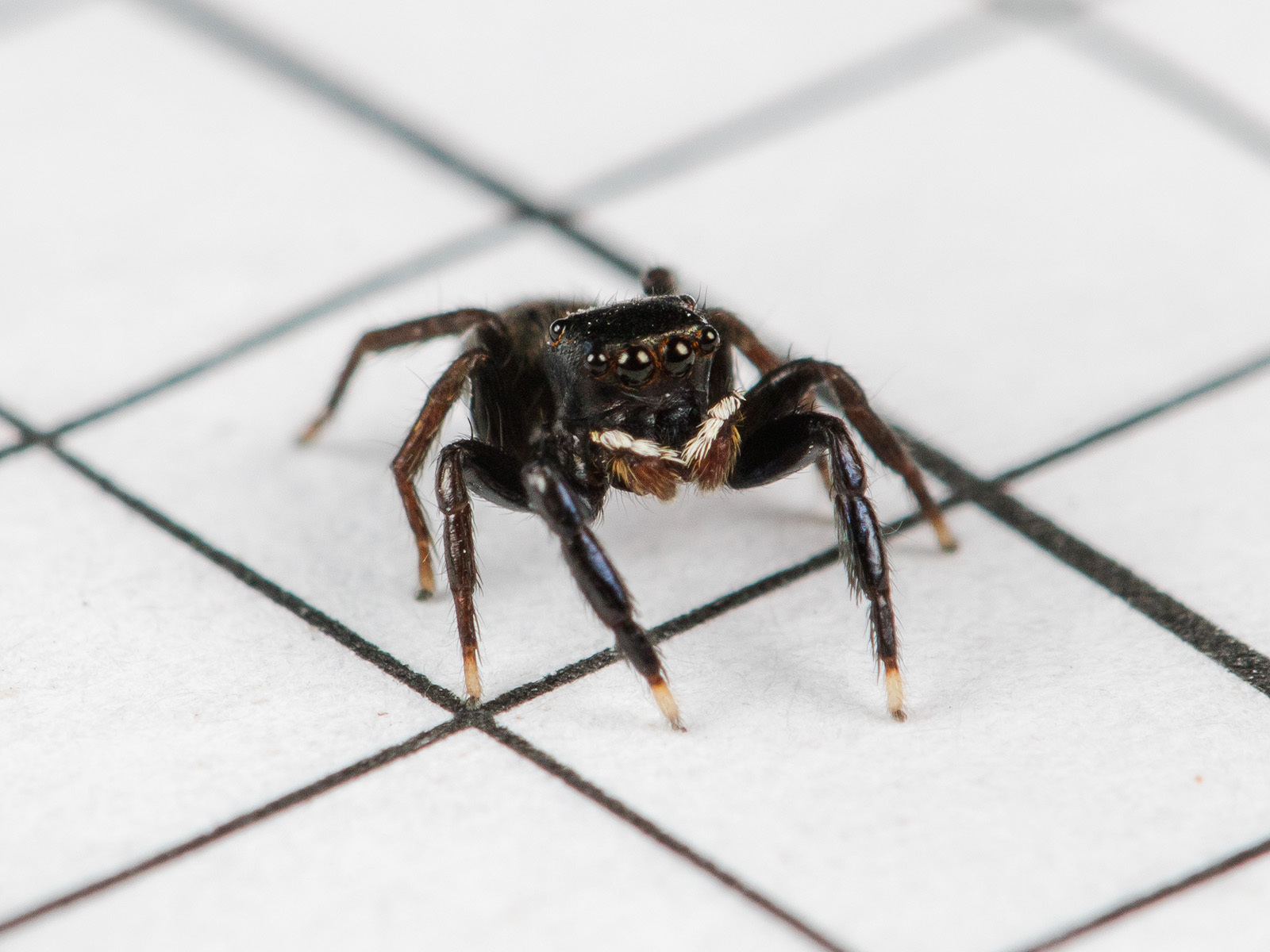
male

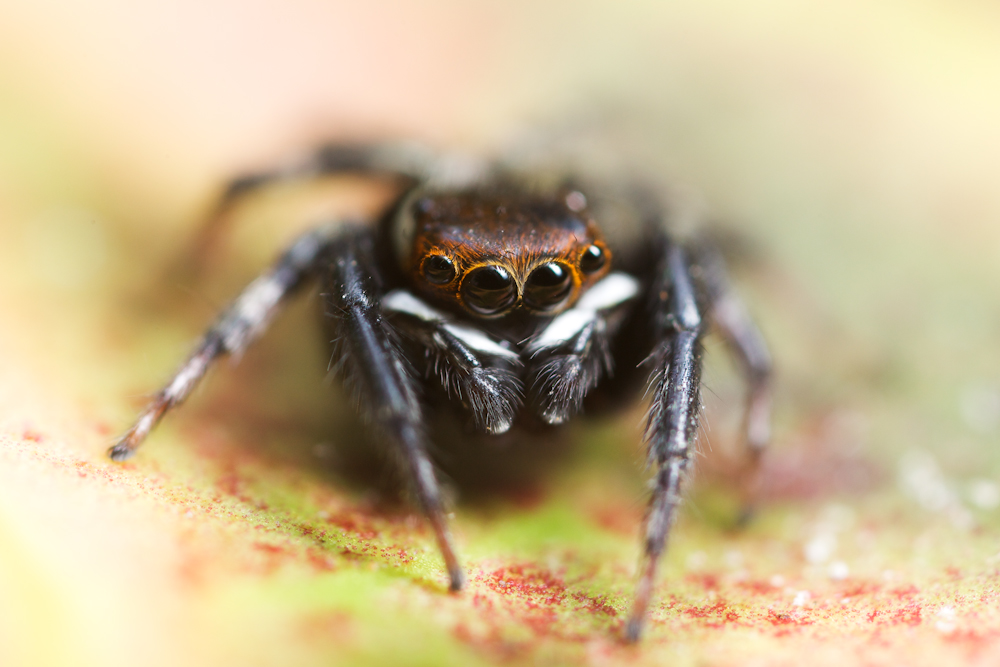
male

The female E. frontalis has a total body length of 3.4-4.4 mm. The cephalothorax is brownish with darker sides and a distinctive pattern. The opisthosoma is yellowish-brown to dark brown with pale markings. The front part displays a characteristic light-colored cardiac mark extending backwards, with dark lateral stripes. The epigyne shows a distinctive structure with rounded openings.

Males are slightly smaller at 3.4-4.3 mm total length. The male cephalothorax is generally darker than in females, often appearing almost black with metallic reflections, particularly around the eye region. The front legs (leg I) are noticeably thickened and darkened, a typical characteristic of male jumping spiders used in courtship displays. The palpal bulb is relatively simple in structure compared to related species.

== Behavior ==
Like other jumping spiders, E. frontalis is an active visual hunter that relies on its excellent eyesight to locate and stalk prey. Males perform elaborate courtship displays using their enlarged front legs and body movements to attract females.

== Taxonomy ==
Euophrys frontalis was originally described as Aranea frontalis by Charles Athanase Walckenaer in 1802. The species has had a complex taxonomic history with several synonyms, including Euophrys maculata, which was recognized as a separate species for many years before being synonymized with E. frontalis. The species serves as the type species for the genus Euophrys.
