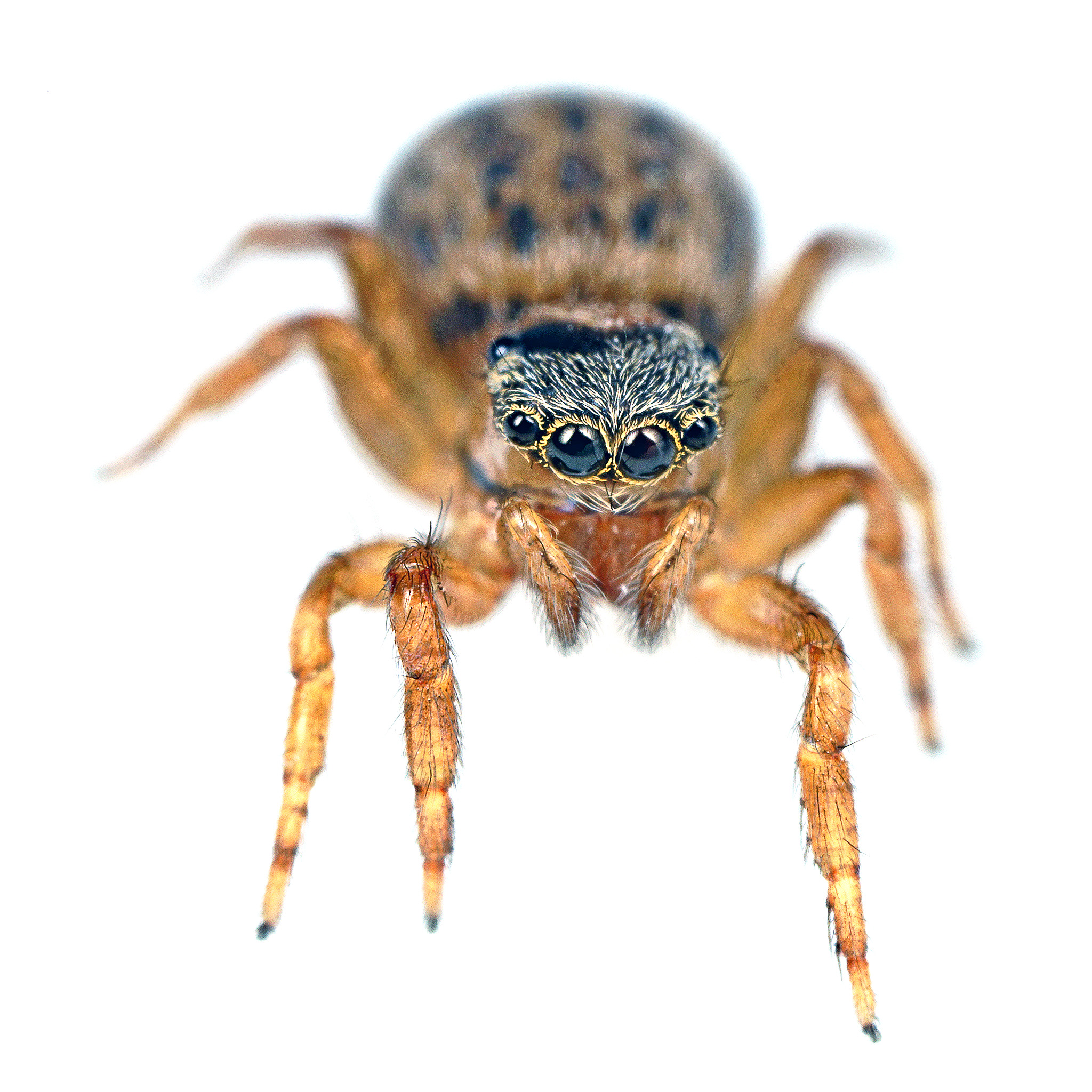
- The related Euophrys frontalis

Scientific classification
- Kingdom: Animalia
- Phylum: Arthropoda
- Subphylum: Chelicerata
- Class: Arachnida
- Order: Araneae
- Infraorder: Araneomorphae
- Family: Salticidae
- Genus: Euophrys
- Species: E. subtilis

Binomial name
- Euophrys subtilis Wesołowska, Azarkina & Russell-Smith, 2014

= Euophrys subtilis =

Species of spider

Euophrys subtilis is a species of jumping spider in the genus Euophrys that is endemic to South Africa. The species was first described in 2014 by Wanda Wesołowska, Galina Azarkina and Anthony Russell-Smith. It is a small spider, with a body that consists of a cephalothorax that measures between 1.6 and 1.7 mm (0.06 and 0.07 in) long and an abdomen that is between 1.7 mm and 1.9 mm (0.07 in) long. The carapace, the topside of the cephalothorax, is dark brown and the underside of the cephalothorax, or sternum, is a lighter brown. The pattern on the abdomen differs between the female and the male. The female has a creamy-white surface that is marked with dark spots. The male has a brown band across its brownish-grey surface. They have brown legs. The copulatory organs enable the spider to be distinguished from other species in the genus. The male has a long thin embolus on its palpal bulb, although not as long as Euophrys nana. The female has wide insemination ducts that loop in the middle and spherical spermathecae.

== Taxonomy ==
Euophrys subtilis is a species of jumping spider that was first described by Wanda Wesołowska Galina Azarkina and Anthony Russell-Smith in 2014. They allocated it to the genus Euophrys, which had been first circumscribed by Carl Ludwig Koch in 1934. The classification is uncertain, as the female has very different copulatory ducts to other species in the genus. It was one of over 500 species identified by the Polish arachnologist Wesołowska during her career, more than any other contemporary writer and second only to the French arachnologist Eugène Simon. The genus is named for a Greek word that can be translated "fair eyebrows". The species is named for a Latin word that can be translated "delicate"and reflects the small size of the spider's body.

In Wayne Maddison's 2015 study of spider phylogenetic classification, the genus Euophrys was listed to the tribe Euophryini. First circumscribed by Simon in 1901, the tribe has also been known as Euophrydinae, but the original name is now more prevalent. It is a member of a subgroup of genera called Evophrydeae after the latter name. It is a member of the clade Saltafresia. Analysis of protein-coding genes showed it was particularly related to Thorelliola. In 2016, Prószyński added the genus to a group of genera named Euopherines, named after the genus. This is a member of the supergroup of genera Euphryoida.

== Description ==
Euophrys subtilis is a small light spider with a body divided into two main parts: a broader oval cephalothorax and wider oval abdomen. The male has a cephalothorax that is typically 1.7 mm (0.07 in) long and 1.3 mm (0.05 in) wide. The carapace, the hard upper part of the cephalothorax, is a moderately high oval. It is dark brown with a covering of colourless hairs. The eye field is black with long brown bristles near the eyes themselves. The underside of the cephalothorax, or sternum, is brown, as in the labium. The chelicerae has two teeth to the front and one to the back.

The spider's abdomen is the same length as the carapace but measures 1.9 mm (0.07 in) in width. The top is brownish-grey with a pattern of a thin white streak across the front, a lighter brown band across the middle, which has darker stains in its middle. It is covered with hairs of matching colours. The underside has a large dark patch. The spider has grey spinnerets. Its legs are generally brown with lighter patches, brown hairs and brown spines.

The female is similar to the male. It has a cephalothorax that is typically 1.6 mm (0.06 in) long and 1.2 mm (0.05 in) wide and an abdomen typically 1.9 mm (0.07 in) long and 1.3 mm (0.05 in) wide. The carapace is similar to the male but the abdomen is creamy-white on top with a pattern of dark spots fused into bands that cross its surface. The underside has large dark spots.

The spider has distinctive copulatory organs. The female has a relatively flat epigyne with a central depression. It has two copulatory openings that lead to long wide insemination ducts that loop in the middle opening into spherical spermathecae. The male's pedipalps are hairy. The palpal tibia has a relatively long and thin projection, or tibial apophysis. The palpal bulb is long with a pronounced lump at the bottom. There is a single spermatophore that winds around inside. The embolus that emanates from its top is very unusual. It is very thin and long, winding up like a wisp. The male's palpal bulb is similar to the related Euophrys nana, but the embolus is shorter.

== Distribution and habitat ==
Euophrys spiders live across the world, although those found in North America may be accidental migrants and those in Central and South America misidentifications. In Africa, they are mainly found in the southern part of the continent. Euophrys subtilis is endemic to South Africa. It has been found only in the southern part of KwaZulu-Natal. The male holotype was discovered in 1976 near Pietermaritzburg. Other examples have been discovered nearby, including near the town of Impendle. It seems to be often found in tree canopies. Like many African species of Euophrys spider, it lives in lowland forests.

== Bibliography ==
- Fernández-Rubio, Fidel (2013). "La etimología de los nombres de las arañas (Araneae)" [The etymology of the names of spiders (Araneae)]. Revista ibérica de Aracnología (in Spanish) (22): 125–130. ISSN 1576-9518.
- Maddison, Wayne P. (2015). "A phylogenetic classification of jumping spiders (Araneae: Salticidae)". The Journal of Arachnology. 43 (3): 231–292. doi:10.1636/arac-43-03-231-292. S2CID 85680279.
- Maddison, Wayne P .; Hedin, Marshal C. (2003). "Jumping spider phylogeny (Araneae: Salticidae)". Invertebrate Systematics. 17 (4): 529–549. doi:10.1071/IS02044.
- Prószyński, Jerzy (2017). "Pragmatic classification of the world's Salticidae (Araneae)". Ecologica Montenegrina. 12: 1–133. doi:10.37828/em.2017.12.1.
- Prószyński, Jerzy; Lissner, Jørgen; Schäfer, Michael (2018). "Taxonomic survey of the genera Euophrys, Pseudeuophrys and Talavera, with description of Euochin gen. n. (Araneae: Salticidae) and with proposals of a new research protocol". Ecologica Montenegrina. 18 (18): 26–74. doi:10.37828/em.2018.18.4.
- Wesołowska, Wanda; Azarkina, Galina N.; Russell-Smith, Anthony (2014). "Euophryine jumping spiders of the Afrotropical Region—new taxa and a checklist (Araneae: Salticidae: Euophryinae)". Zootaxa. 3789 (1): 1–72. doi:10.11646/zootaxa.3789.1.1. PMID 24869747.
- Wiśniewski, Konrad (2020). "Over 40 years with jumping spiders: on the 70th birthday of Wanda Wesołowska". Zootaxa. 4899 (1): 5–14. doi:10.11646/zootaxa.4899.1.3. PMID 33756825. S2CID 232337200.
