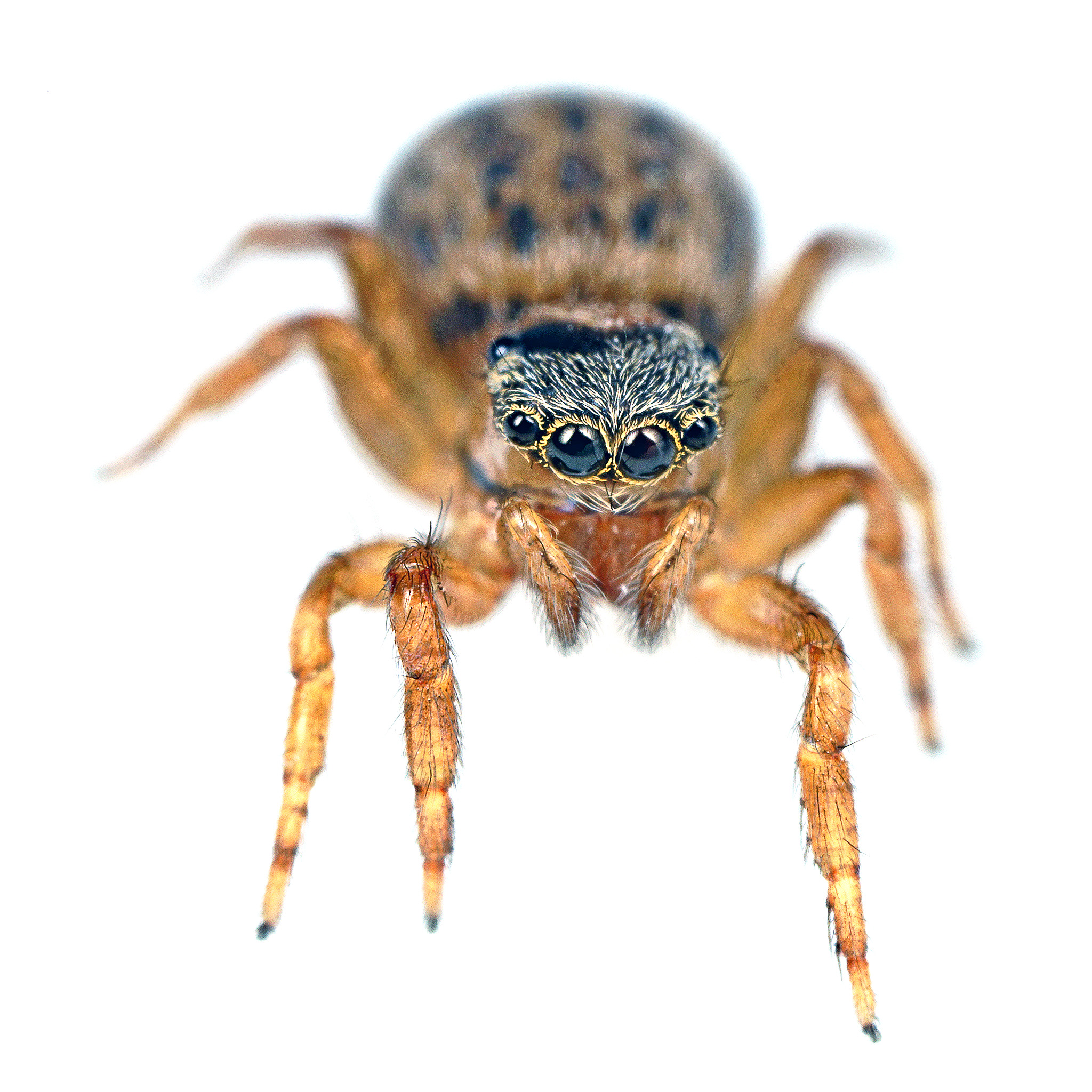
- The related Euophrys frontalis

Scientific classification
- Kingdom: Animalia
- Phylum: Arthropoda
- Subphylum: Chelicerata
- Class: Arachnida
- Order: Araneae
- Infraorder: Araneomorphae
- Family: Salticidae
- Genus: Euophrys
- Species: E. gracilis

Binomial name
- Euophrys gracilis Wesołowska, Azarkina & Russell-Smith, 2014

= Euophrys gracilis =

Species of spider

Euophrys gracilis is a species of jumping spider in the genus Euophrys that is endemic to South Africa. The species was first described in 2014 by Wanda Wesołowska, Galina Azarkina and Anthony Russell-Smith. It is a small spider, with a body that consists of a cephalothorax that measures between 1.8 and 2 mm (0.07 and 0.08 in) long and an abdomen that is between 2 mm and 2.6 mm (0.10 in) long. The carapace, the topside of the cephalothorax, and the underside of the cephalothorax, or sternum, are brown, although the male is lighter than the female. The pattern on the abdomen differs between the female and the male. The female has a mosaic of light dark patches while the male has a pattern of white stripes. They have brown legs. The copulatory organs enable the spider to be distinguished from other species in the genus. The male has a long thin embolus on its palpal bulb while the female has insemination ducts that have a knotted loop near the top.

== Etymology and taxonomy ==
Euophrys gracilis is a species of jumping spider that was first described by Wanda Wesołowska Galina Azarkina and Anthony Russell-Smith in 2014. They allocated it to the genus Euophrys, which had been first circumscribed by Carl Ludwig Koch in 1934. It was one of over 500 species identified by the Polish arachnologist Wesołowska during her career, more than any other contemporary writer and second only to the French arachnologist Eugène Simon. The genus is named for a Greek word that can be translated "fair eyebrows". The species is named for a Latin word that can be translated "slender".

In Wayne Maddison's 2015 study of spider phylogenetic classification, the genus Euophrys was listed to the tribe Euophryini. First circumscribed by Simon in 1901, the tribe has also been known as Euophrydinae, but the original name is now more prevalent. It is a member of a subgroup of genera called Evophrydeae after the latter name. It is a member of the clade Saltafresia. Analysis of protein-coding genes showed it was particularly related to Thorelliola. In 2016, Prószyński added the genus to a group of genera named Euopherines, named after the genus. This is a member of the supergroup of genera Euphryoida.

== Description ==
Euophrys gracilis is a small light spider with a body divided into two main parts: a broader oval cephalothorax and wider oval abdomen. The male has a cephalothorax that is typically 1.9 mm (0.07 in) long and 1.4 mm (0.06 in) wide. The carapace, the hard upper part of the cephalothorax, is a brown oval,. The eye field is black with a covering of thin brown and grey hairs, while there are some longer brown bristles near the eyes themselves. The underside of the cephalothorax, or sternum, is brownish. The mouthparts are also brownish, including the labium and maxillae, although the latter has paler parts.

The spider's abdomen is an oval that measures typically 2.1 mm (0.08 in) in length and 1.5 mm (0.06 in)} in width. The top is brownish-grey with a covering of grey and brown hairs. It has a pattern of a thin dark line down the middle of a whitish wide streak across the front and a whitish band along three sides. The underside has a dark grey with a pattern of four light lines. The spider has grey spinnerets. Its legs are generally brown, the first pair larger than the remainder, brown hairs and brown spines.

The female is similar to the male. It has a cephalothorax that ranges between 1.8 and 2 mm (0.07 and 0.08 in) in length and 1.4 and 1.5 mm in width. The carapace is slightly darker but otherwise similar to the male, although the eye field is shiny. The abdomen measures between 2 and 2.6 mm (0.10 in) in length and 1.6 and 2.1 mm (0.06 and 0.08 in) in width. It is more rounded and instead has a mosaic pattern of dark and lighter patches that are quite indistinctly contrasted.

The spider has distinctive copulatory organs. The female has an epigyne with two large depressions near its rear. It has two copulatory openings that lead via a knotted loop into short insemination ducts that lead into spherical spermathecae, or receptacles. The male's pedipalps are hairy, with particularly long hairs on the palpal tibia, which has a relatively long and thin projection, or tibial apophysis. The palpal bulb is bulbous with a pronounced lump at the bottom. There is a single spermatophore that winds around inside. The embolus that emanates from its top is very unusual. It is very thin and long, with a short coil. The male's palpal bulb is similar to the related Euophrys limpopo, but the embolus is longer and has a shorter coil. The female epigyne is similar to Euophrys falciger but can be distinguished by its shorter insemination ducts and the position and shape of the depression on the epigyne.

== Distribution and habitat ==
Euophrys spiders live across the world, although those found in North America may be accidental migrants and those in Central and South America misidentifications. In Africa, they are mainly found in the southern part of the continent. Euophrys gracilis lives in Lesotho and South Africa. It is particularly common in south-eastern Lesotho and KwaZulu-Natal. The male holotype was discovered in 2003 near Ha Liphapang in Quthing District at an altitude of 1,700 m (5,600 ft) above sea level. Other examples have been discovered nearby, including near the village of Ha Frans. The first to be identified in South Africa was found in 1976 near Pietermaritzburg. It has been found in hillside amongst leaf litter.
