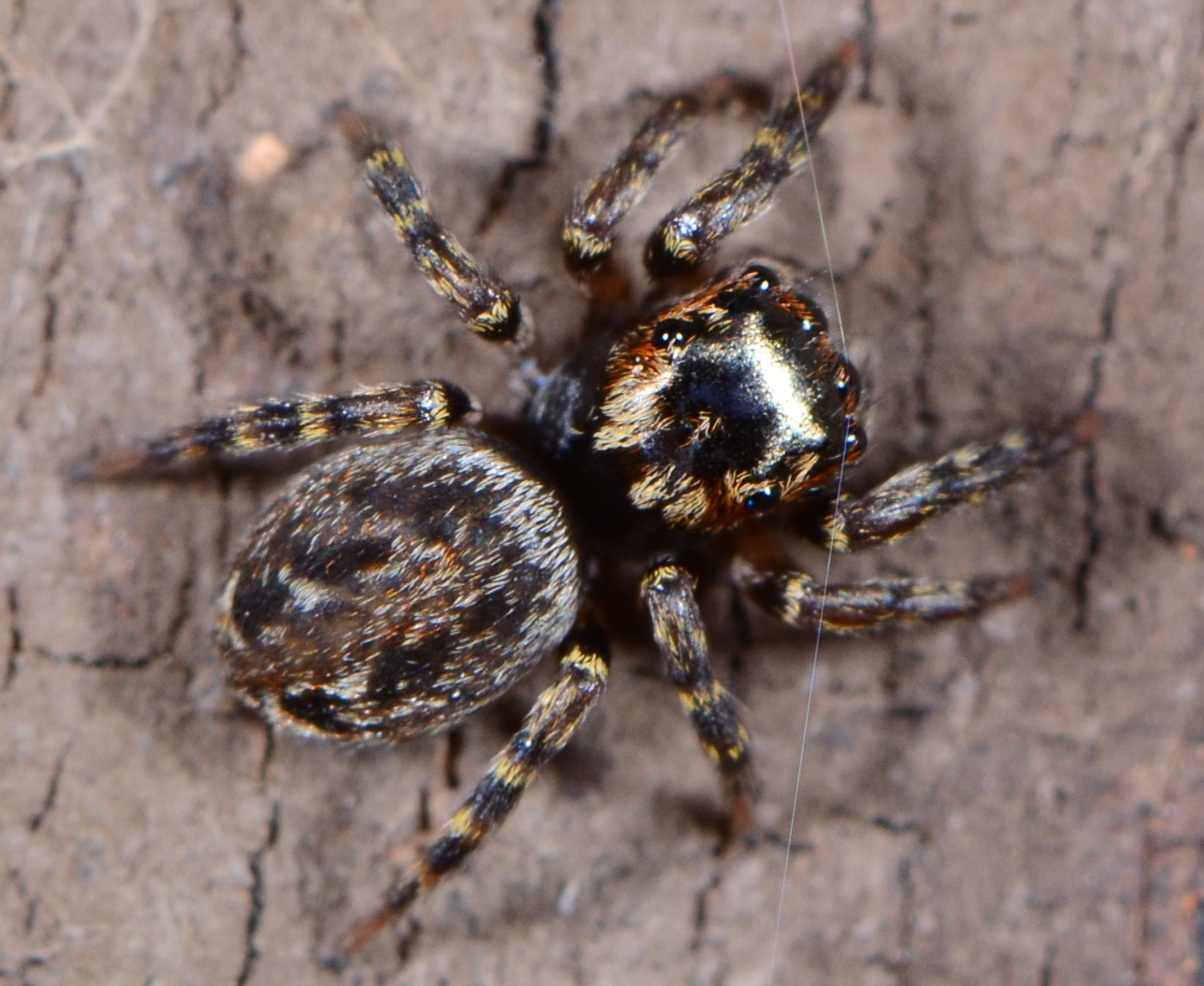
- female
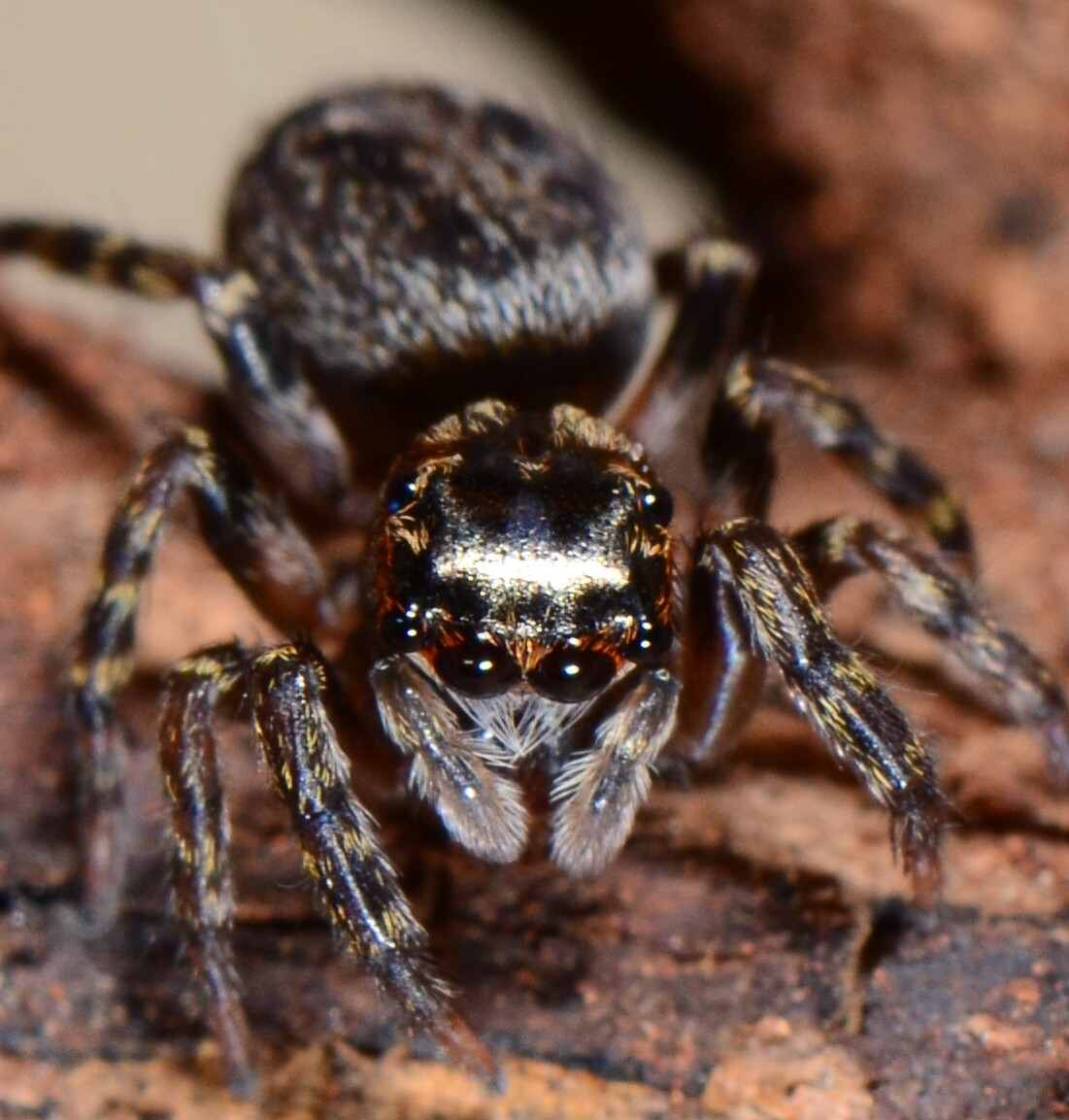
- female

Scientific classification
- Kingdom: Animalia
- Phylum: Arthropoda
- Subphylum: Chelicerata
- Class: Arachnida
- Order: Araneae
- Infraorder: Araneomorphae
- Family: Salticidae
- Genus: Euophrys
- Species: E. limpopo

Binomial name
- Euophrys limpopo Wesołowska, Azarkina & Russell-Smith, 2014

= Euophrys limpopo =

Species of spider

Euophrys limpopo is a species of jumping spider in the genus Euophrys that is endemic to South Africa. The species was first described in 2014 by Wanda Wesołowska, Galina Azarkina and Anthony Russell-Smith. It is a very small brown spider, with a body that consists of a cephalothorax that is typically 1.1 mm (0.04 in) long and an abdomen that is typically 1.2 mm (0.05 in) long. The cephalothorax has a darker carapace, or topside, and a lighter sternum, or underside, while the abdomen is reversed. Its eye field is even darker, nearly black. A hairless scutum covers much of the abdomen. The copulatory organs are unique amongst spiders in the genus, particularly the long thin embolus on the palpal bulb of the male. The female has not been described.

== Etymology and taxonomy ==
Euophrys limpopo is a species of jumping spider that was first described by the arachnologists Wanda Wesołowska Galina Azarkina and Anthony Russell-Smith in 2014. They allocated it to the genus Euophrys, which had been first circumscribed by Carl Ludwig Koch in 1934. It was one of over 500 species identified by Wesołowska during her career, more than any other contemporary writer and second only to the French arachnologist Eugène Simon. The genus is named for a Greek word that can be translated "fair eyebrows". The species is named for the area where it was first found.

In Wayne Maddison's 2015 study of spider phylogenetic classification, the genus Euophrys was listed to the tribe Euophryini. First circumscribed by Simon in 1901, the tribe has also been known as Euophrydinae, but the original name is now more prevalent. It is a member of a subgroup of genera called Euophrydeae after the latter name. It is a member of the clade Saltafresia. Analysis of protein-coding genes showed it was particularly related to Thorelliola. In 2016, Jerzy Prószyński added the genus to a group of genera named Euopherines, named after the genus. This is a member of the supergroup of genera Euphryoida.

== Description ==
Euophrys limpopo is a very small spider with a body divided into two main parts: a broader oval cephalothorax and longer abdomen. The male has a cephalothorax that is typically 1.1 mm (0.04 in) long, while the abdomen is 1.2 mm (0.05 in) long, both measuring 0.8 mm (0.03 in) in width. The carapace, the hard upper part of the cephalothorax, is dark brown and hairless. The eye field is darker, nearly black, with a few colourless bristles at the very front. The underside of the cephalothorax, or sternum, is brown. The spider's face, or clypeus, is low and dark, with a scattering of white hairs.

The chelicerae has two teeth to the front and one to the back, while the remainder of the mouthparts, including the labium, are brown, except for small white edging to the maxillae. The spider's abdomen is oval with its topside dominated by a shiny brown hairless scutum, which is similar to species in the genus Chalcoscirtus. The underside is darker. The spider has grey spinnerets. The legs are brown with fine colourless hairs, with the pedipalps similarly brown.

The spider has distinctive copulatory organs. Only the male has been described, but this is sufficient to be able to show how the species differs from other Euophrys spiders. The palpal bulb is bulbous with a pronounced bulge to the bottom and a very thin wiry embolus sprouting from near the top. The embolus has a distinctive looping curve. The palpal tibia is small and has an erect protrusion, or tibial apophysis, that has a slight kink to its end. It also has a tooth-like spike sticking out of the side. The palpal bulb is similar to Euophrys gracilis but has a smaller palpal bulb and a shorter thinner embolus.

== Distribution and habitat ==
Euophrys spiders live across the world, although those found in North America may be accidental migrants and those in Central and South America misidentifications. In Africa, they are mainly found in the southern part of the continent. Euophrys limpopo is endemic to South Africa. It has been only found in the province of Limpopo. The male holotype was discovered in 2012 in the Magoebaskloof at an altitude of 1,190 m (3,900 ft) above sea level. It was found in leaf litter. Like many species in the genus, it thrives in montane forest.
