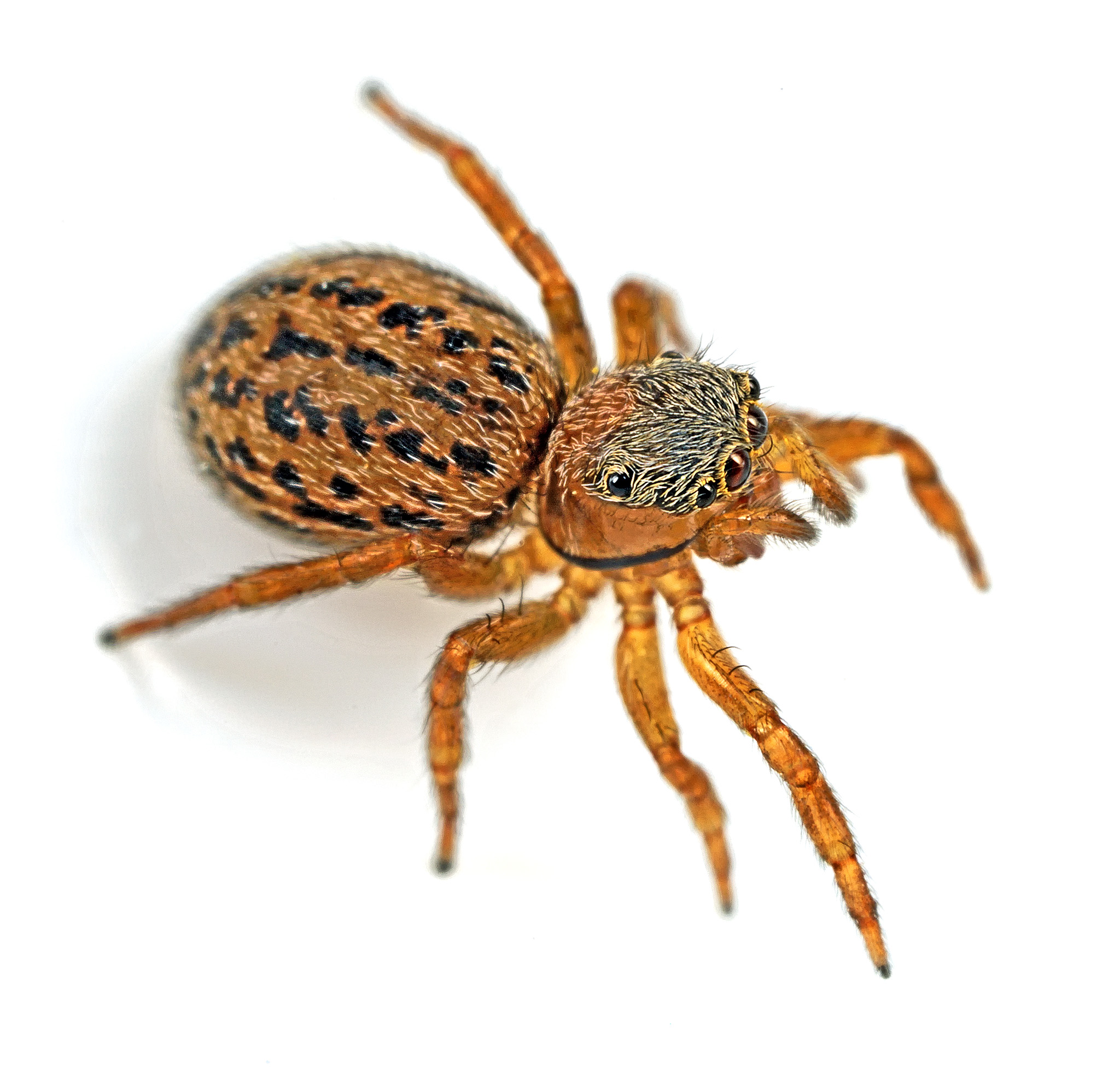
- The related Euophrys frontalis

Conservation status
- Least Concern (IUCN 3.1)

Scientific classification
- Kingdom: Animalia
- Phylum: Arthropoda
- Subphylum: Chelicerata
- Class: Arachnida
- Order: Araneae
- Infraorder: Araneomorphae
- Family: Salticidae
- Genus: Euophrys
- Species: E. purcelli

Binomial name
- Euophrys purcelli G. W. Peckham & E. G. Peckham, 1903

Synonyms
- Euophrys purcellii Peckham & Peckham, 1903

= Euophrys purcelli =

Species of spider

Euophrys purcelli or Willowmore's Euophrys jumping spider is a species of jumping spider in the genus Euophrys that is endemic to South Africa. It lives in karoo and succulent karoo. The female was first described in 1903 by George and Elizabeth Peckham and the male in 2012 by Wanda Wesołowska. It is a small spider, with a body that consists of an oval cephalothorax that measures between 1.5 and 2.0 mm (0.06 and 0.08 in) long and an abdomen that is between 1.4 and 2.3 mm (0.06 and 0.09 in) long. The female has a larger abdomen than the male. The spider is generally dark brown to blackish and covered in delicate or colourless hairs. The spider's spinnerets are yellow to brownish or greyish. Its copulatory organs are distinctive. The female has the longest accessory glands in the genus and the male has a short curl for an embolus and a very thin appendage on its palpal tibia, or tibial apophysis.

== Taxonomy ==
Euophrys purcelli is a species of jumping spider that was first described by the arachnologists George W. Peckham & Elizabeth G. Peckham in 1903. They allocated it to the genus Euophrys, which had been first circumscribed by Carl Ludwig Koch in 1834. Analysis of protein-coding genes showed it was particularly related to Thorelliola.

In Wayne Maddison's 2015 study of spider phylogenetic classification, the genus Euophrys was listed to the tribe Euophryini. First circumscribed by Simon in 1901, the tribe has also been known as Euophrydinae, but the original name is now more prevalent. Jerzy Prószyński allocated the genus as member of a subgroup of genera called Euophrydeae after the latter name. It is also a member of the clade Saltafresia. In 2016, Prószyński added the genus to a group of genera named Euopherines, named after the genus. This is a member of the supergroup of genera Euphryoida.

== Etymology ==
The spider is popularly known as Willowmore's Euophrys jumping spider, named after Willowmore in Eastern Cape, South Africa. The genus is named for a Greek word that can be translated "fair eyebrows". The species is named for the arachnologist William Frederick Purcell.

== Description ==
Euophrys purcelli is a small spider with a body divided into two main parts: a larger cephalothorax and a smaller abdomen. The male has an oval cephalothorax that is between 1.5 and 2.0 mm (0.06 and 0.08 in) long and 1.1 and 1.5 mm (0.04 and 0.06 in) wide. The carapace, the hard upper part of the cephalothorax, is moderately high and mainly dark brown, apart from the very back which is yellow. It is covered in colourless hairs. The spider's eye field is shiny black. There is a noticeable depression, or fovea, in the middle of the carapace. The underside of the cephalothorax, or sternum, is brown. There is a single tooth in the chelicerae. The spider's face, or clypeus, is low and dark. It has bright yellow hairs that continue to the sides of the third row of eyes. The male's abdomen is slightly smaller than its carapace, measuring 1.6 to 1.9 mm (0.06 to 0.07 in) in length and typically 1 to 1.4 mm (0.04 to 0.06 in) in width. The top is blackish, covered in colourless hairs like the carapace, but with a pattern of white spots and chevrons. In some examples, the spots join to form bands. The underside is brownish. The spider's spinnerets are yellow to brownish. The front legs are larger than the rest but otherwise similar. They have brown hairs and brown spines. The legs look as if they are striped brown and yellow. The pedipalps are yellowish with black parts.

The female is similar to the male in size and shape. It has a similar sized cephalothorax to the male, typically 1.9 mm (0.07 in) in length and 1.1 and 1.3 mm (0.04 and 0.05 in) in width. The carapace is a flat dark brown oval that is covered in delicate hairs. The eye field has a paler patch, while the eyes are surrounded in black rings. The sternum is light brown, as are the mouthparts. The abdomen has a pattern of small grey or greyish-black spots on the top and three dark bands on the bottom. The spinnerets are greyish and the legs brown.

The spider has distinctive copulatory organs. The female epigyne has a large round depression divided by a ridge down the middle. Spiral flanges that show a level of sclerotization surround the copulatory openings. The openings lead to short insemination ducts and small spermathecae, or receptacles. There are very large accessory glands attached to the walls of the spermathecae. There is a very thin appendage, or tibial apophysis, on the palpal tibia. The cymbium is rounded and the palpal bulb has a clear bulge on the bottom. The embolus that extends from the top of the bulb is short and makes a distinctive curl.

The copulatory organs enable the spider to be distinguished from others in the genus. Particularly, the short curl of the embolus, the short insemination ducts and the very long accessory glands, the longest in the genus, are characteristic of the species. It is otherwise similar to Euophrys bifida. It is particularly closely related to Euophrys elizabethae, but can be distinguished by the way that the tibial apophysis is longer and narrower, the insemination ducts more curved and the accessory glands longer.

== Distribution and habitat ==
Euophrys spiders live across the world, although those found in North America may be accidental migrants and those in Central and South America misidentifications. In Africa, they are mainly found in the southern part of the continent. Euophrys purcelli is endemic to South Africa. The male holotype was discovered on Signal Hill on the Cape Peninsula. The first female was seen, in a grouping of two females and a males, in the same area in 1978. It is also common near Willowmore in Eastern Cape, with the first examples being found in 2004. Other members of the species have been found in De Hoop Nature Reserve in Western Cape.

Most Euophrys spiders seem to prefer living in forests. Euophrys purcelli has been found in forests of Eucalyptus and Protea trees, including the fynbos that are typical of South Africa.
