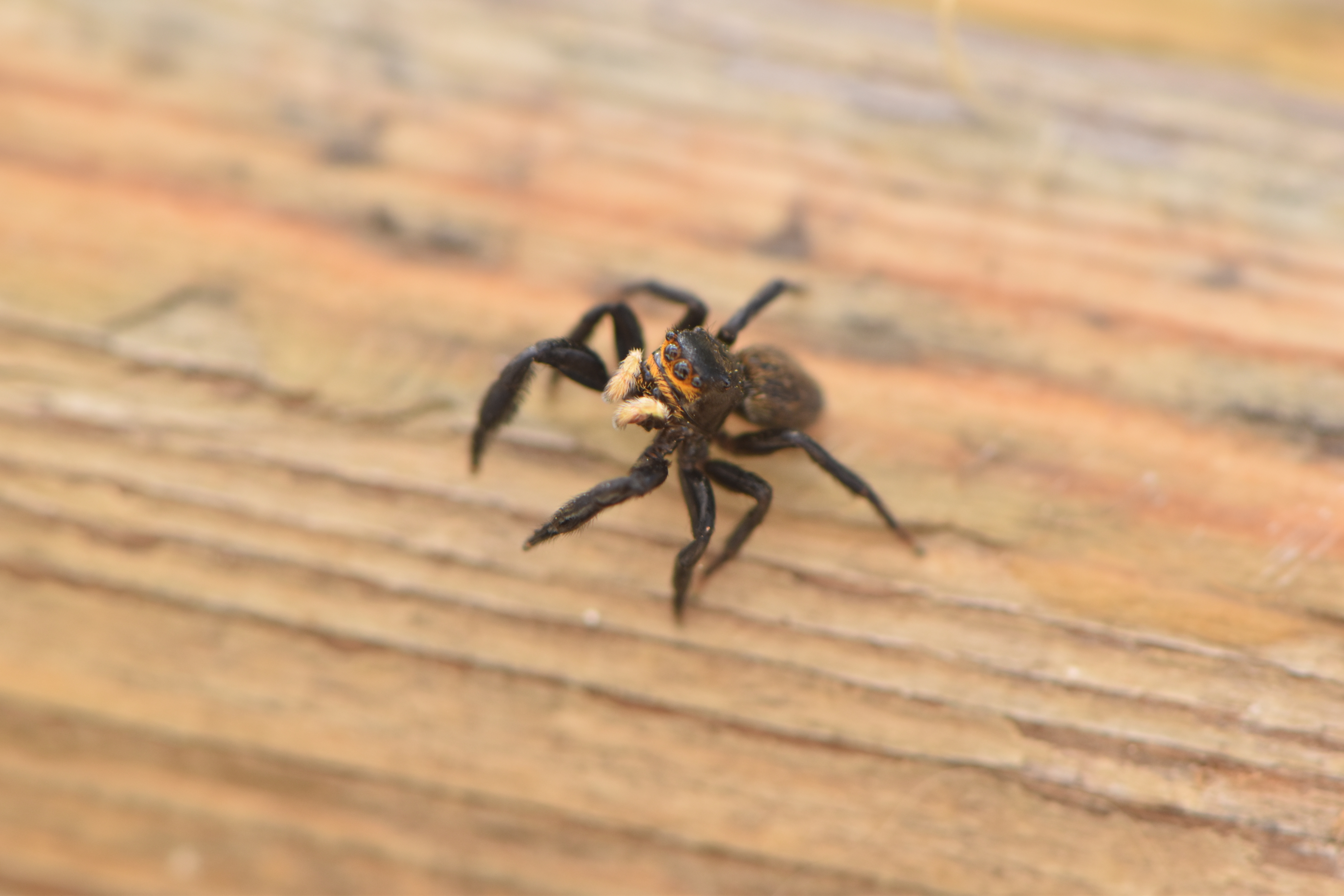
- The related Euophrys frontalis

Scientific classification
- Kingdom: Animalia
- Phylum: Arthropoda
- Subphylum: Chelicerata
- Class: Arachnida
- Order: Araneae
- Infraorder: Araneomorphae
- Family: Salticidae
- Genus: Euophrys
- Species: E. bifida

Binomial name
- Euophrys bifida Wesołowska, Azarkina & Russell-Smith, 2014

= Euophrys bifida =

Species of jumping spider

Euophrys bifida is a species of jumping spider in the genus Euophrys that is endemic to South Africa. The species was first described in 2014 by Wanda Wesołowska, Galina Azarkina and Anthony Russell-Smith. It is a small spider, with a body that consists of a cephalothorax that is between 1.2 and 1.4 mm (0.05 and 0.06 in) long and an abdomen between 1.2 and 1.7 mm (0.07 in) long. The cephalothorax has a brown carapace, or topside, while the abdomen is marked by a mosaic pattern of dark patches on a light background. While the female has uniform light brown legs, the male's legs are generally darker but have yellowish-grey sections. The spider is most easily differentiated from others species in the genus by the unusual arrangement of its teeth. It has lines of stiff hairs in its mouth with two teeth to the rear. It is the cleft shape of these teeth that is the source of the species name.

== Taxonomy and etymology ==
Euophrys bifida is a species of jumping spider that was first described by the arachnologists Wanda Wesołowska Galina Azarkina and Anthony Russell-Smith in 2014. They allocated it to the genus Euophrys, which had been first circumscribed by Carl Ludwig Koch in 1934. It was one of over 500 species identified by Wesołowska during her career, more than any other contemporary writer and second only to the French arachnologist Eugène Simon. The genus is named for a Greek word that can be translated "fair eyebrows". The species is named for the shape of the spider's back tooth, which are bifid, or cleft into two spikes.

Analysis of protein-coding genes showed that the genus Euophrys is particularly related to Thorelliola. In Wayne Maddison's 2015 study of spider phylogenetic classification, it was listed to the tribe Euophryini. First circumscribed by Simon in 1901, the tribe has also been known as Euophrydinae, but the original name is now more prevalent. It is a member of the clade Saltafresia. The genus is also a member of a subgroup of genera called Euophrydeae after the latter name. In 2016, Jerzy Prószyński added the genus to a group of genera named Euopherines, named after the genus. This is a member of the supergroup of genera Euphryoida.

== Description ==
Euophrys bifida is a small spider with a body divided into two main parts: a rectangular cephalothorax and thinner, more oval abdomen. The male has a cephalothorax that is between 1.2 and 1.3 mm (0.05 and 0.05 in) long and typically 0.9 mm (0.04 in) wide. The carapace, the hard upper part of the cephalothorax, is a moderately high oval that is mainly dark brown with some short colourless hairs. The eye field is black, with large bristles particularly near its eyes, which are unusually large, particular those to the front. The underside of the cephalothorax, or sternum, is large and has a distinctive convex shape. The spider's face, or clypeus, is black, as are the majority of the mouthparts. The arrangement of teeth in the chelicerae is distinctive, with two rows of stiff hairs forming lines between two fork-shaped back teeth and a single curved fang to the front.

The male spider's abdomen is an oval that is typically 1.2 long and between 0.8 and 0.9 mm (0.03 and 0.04 in) wide. It is dark with a mosaic pattern of very small blackish-brown plates and two thin yellowish-orange lines from front to back. The sides of the abdomen are whitish with thin diagonal white belts while the underside is dark with a pattern of white spots that make four streaks. It is between 1.5 and 1.7 mm (0.06 and 0.07 in) long and typically 1.1 mm (0.04 in) wide. The spider has dark grey spinnerets. The spider's legs and mainly blackish, with yellowish-grey sections and brown leg hairs and spines. The pedipalps are dark.

The spider's copulatory organs include a rounded palpal bulb, in some examples more bean-shaped. There is a small thin curled embolus attached to the top that projects outwards and lines up with the large cymbium that surrounds the outside of the bulb. The cymbium is hairy. The palpal tibia is blunt and has a relatively long erect protrusion, or tibial apophysis, that has a pointed tip.

The female has a larger cephalothorax than the male, between 1.3 and 1.4 mm (0.06 in) mm long and between 1 and 1.1 mm (0.04 and 0.04 in) wide. The carapace that similar to the male, although slightly lighter. The chelicerae are also similar. The female's abdomen is also larger than the male's, between 1.5 and 1.7 mm (0.06 and 0.07 in) in length and typically 1.1 mm (0.04 in) in width. Both the top and bottom are light and covered in a mosaic of small dark patches. There are indistinct lighter chevrons to the rear of the underside. The spider's legs are light brown.

The female has a epigyne with two rounded depressions towards the rear. The edges have limited sclerotization on their rims. It has two copulatory openings that lead to very short and relatively wide insemination ducts that lead to large ovoid spermathecae, or receptacles. There are large accessory glands in the wall of the spermathecae. Apart from the distinctive teeth, the spider is similar to other species in the genus. The male's palpal bulb is particularly similar to the related Euophrys purcelli, but the embolic coil has a larger diameter and the shape of the tibial apophysis is different.

== Distribution and habitat ==
Euophrys spiders live across the world, although those found in North America may be accidental migrants and those in Central and South America misidentifications. In Africa, they are mainly found in the southern part of the continent. Euophrys bifida is endemic to South Africa. It has been only found in Eastern Cape. The male holotype was discovered in 2011 on Hogsback in the Amatola Mountains. Other examples have been found across the province, including in the Fort Fordyce Nature Reserve. It was found in woodland, particularly living in leaf litter.
