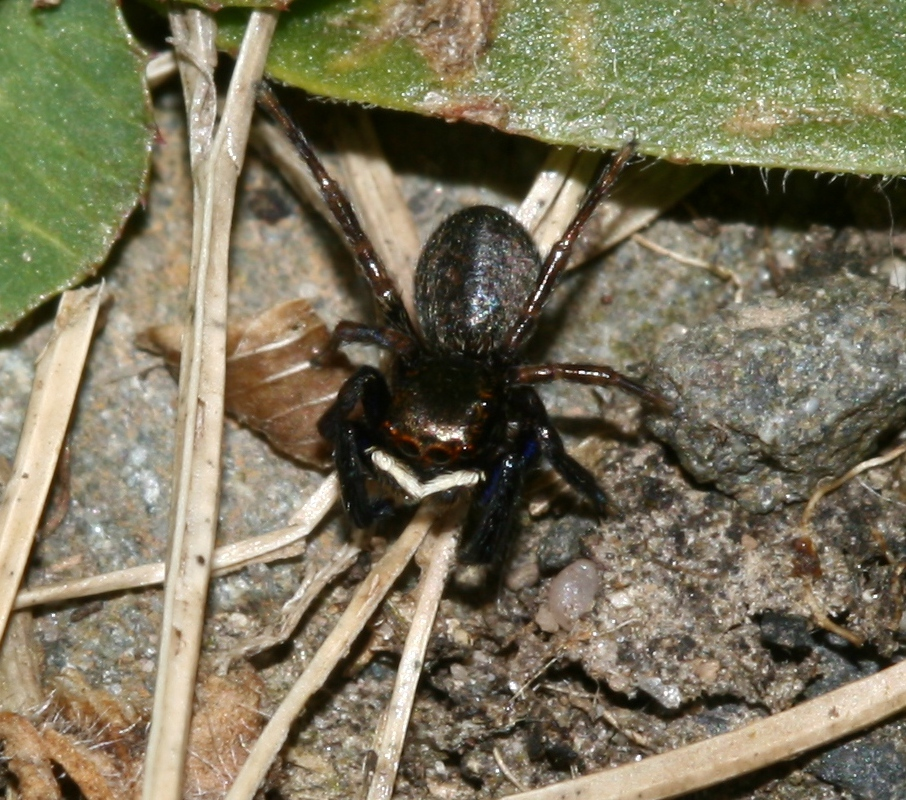
- The related Euophrys frontalis

Scientific classification
- Kingdom: Animalia
- Phylum: Arthropoda
- Subphylum: Chelicerata
- Class: Arachnida
- Order: Araneae
- Infraorder: Araneomorphae
- Family: Salticidae
- Genus: Euophrys
- Species: E. elizabethae

Binomial name
- Euophrys elizabethae Wesołowska, Azarkina & Russell-Smith, 2014

= Euophrys elizabethae =

Species of spider

Euophrys elizabethae is a species of jumping spider in the genus Euophrys that is endemic to South Africa. The species was first described in 2014 by Wanda Wesołowska, Galina Azarkina and Anthony Russell-Smith and named after the arachnologist Elizabeth Peckham. It is a small brown spider, with a body that consists of a cephalothorax that is between 2.2 and 2.3 mm (0.09 and 0.09 in) long and an abdomen between 2.2 and 2.6 mm (0.10 in) long. The cephalothorax has a plain but darker carapace, or topside, and a lighter sternum, or underside, while the abdomen has a mosaic pattern of lighter and darker patches that differ in detail between the sexes. The copulatory organs are unique amongst spiders in the genus. The male has a shorter and wider tibial apophysis than related species. The female has shorter accessory glands and longer and more strongly curved insemination ducts.

== Taxonomy and etymology ==
Euophrys elizabethae is a species of jumping spider that was first described by the arachnologists Wanda Wesołowska Galina Azarkina and Anthony Russell-Smith in 2014. They allocated it to the genus Euophrys, which had been first circumscribed by Carl Ludwig Koch in 1934. It was one of over 500 species identified by Wesołowska during her career, more than any other contemporary writer and second only to the French arachnologist Eugène Simon. The genus is named for a Greek word that can be translated "fair eyebrows". The species is named for the arachnologist Elizabeth Peckham.

In Wayne Maddison's 2015 study of spider phylogenetic classification, the genus Euophrys was listed to the tribe Euophryini. First circumscribed by Simon in 1901, the tribe has also been known as Euophrydinae, but the original name is now more prevalent. It is a member of a subgroup of genera called Euophrydeae after the latter name. It is a member of the clade Saltafresia. Analysis of protein-coding genes showed it was particularly related to Thorelliola. In 2016, Jerzy Prószyński added the genus to a group of genera named Euopherines, named after the genus. This is a member of the supergroup of genera Euphryoida.

== Description ==
Euophrys elizabethae is a small spider with a body divided into two main parts: a broader oval cephalothorax and longer abdomen. The male has a cephalothorax that is typically 2.3 mm (0.09 in) long and 1.8 mm (0.07 in) wide. The carapace, the hard upper part of the cephalothorax, is a brown oval. The eye field is black, with a covering of colourless hairs. The underside of the cephalothorax, or sternum, is light brown. The spider's face, or clypeus, is low and covered in of white hairs. The chelicerae has two teeth to the front and one to the back, while the remainder of the mouthparts, including the labium, are light brown.

The male spider's abdomen is an oval that is typically 2.2 mm (0.09 in) long and 1.6 mm (0.06 in) wide. It is mainly dark grey with a mosaic pattern of very dense small dark and light patches and chevrons. The sides of the abdomen are yellowish with indistinct dark marking while the underside is greyish-yellow. The spider has light spinnerets and brown legs, the first pair of legs being darker than the rest.

The female looks similar externally to the male, although it is hairier, with a cephalothorax that is 2.2 mm long and 1.6 wide and an abdomen that is 2.6 mm (0.10 in) long and 1.7 mm (0.07 in) wide. The abdomen is dark grey on top with a mosaic pattern of smaller light patches and a yellowish underside. The spider's legs are yellowish-grey with darker areas.

The spider has distinctive copulatory organs. The female has limited sclerotization on its epigyne. It has two copulatory openings that lead to very short and relatively wide insemination ducts which loop around before feeding into the spermathecae, or receptacles. There are large accessory glands in the wall of the spermathecae. The male has a long palpal bulb with a pronounced bulge to the bottom and a very small curled embolus attached to the top. The palpal tibia is small and has a short erect protrusion, or tibial apophysis. The spider is similar to the related Euophrys purcelli, especially the design of the male's palpal bulb, but the male has a shorter and wider tibial apophysis and the female has shorter accessory glands and longer and more strongly curved insemination ducts.

== Distribution and habitat ==
Euophrys spiders live across the world, although those found in North America may be accidental migrants and those in Central and South America misidentifications. In Africa, they are mainly found in the southern part of the continent. Euophrys elizabethae is endemic to South Africa. It has been only found in Western Cape]. The male holotype was discovered in 1976 in the Kirstenbosch National Botanical Garden. It was found in woodland. Like many species in the genus, it thrives in fynbos.
