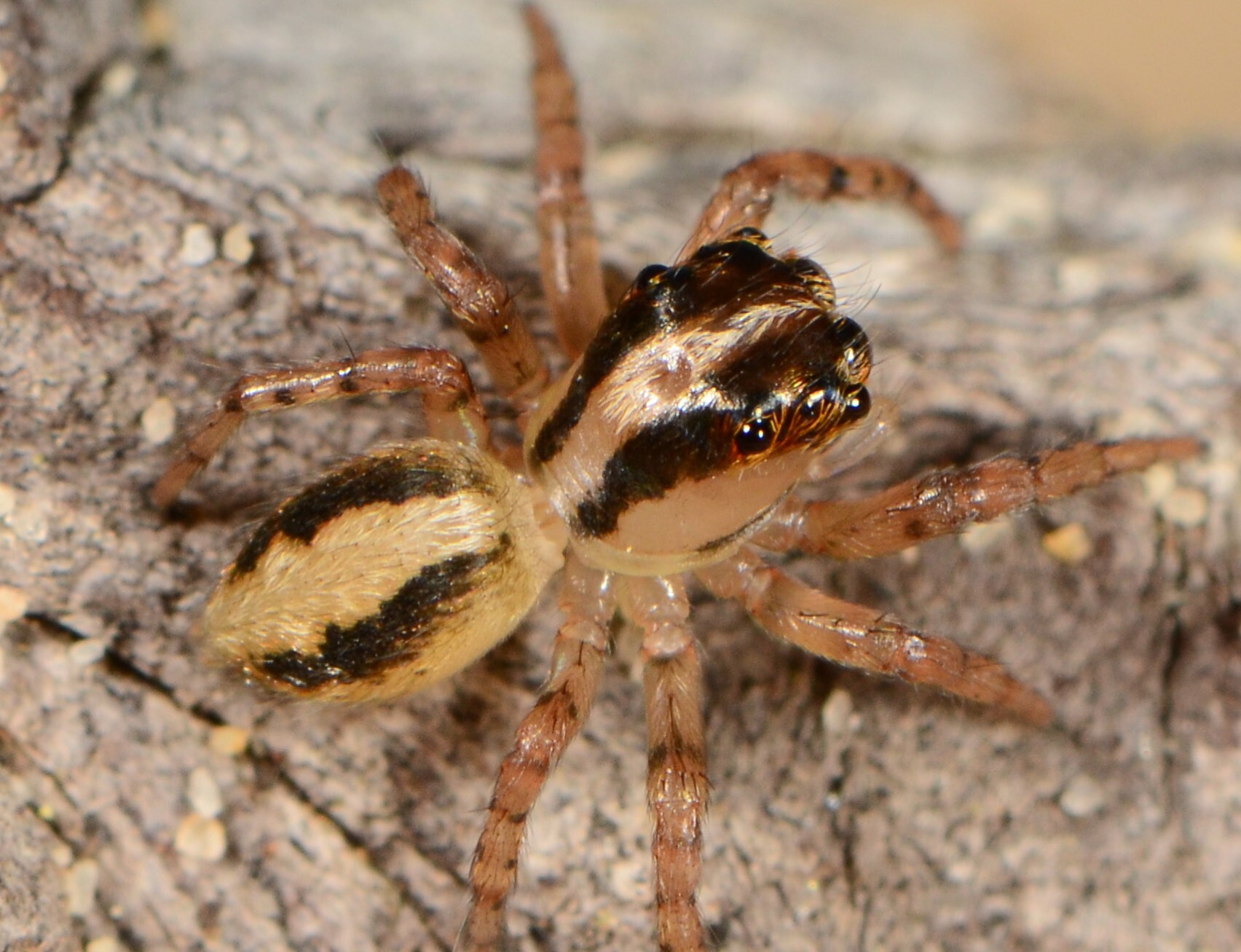
- female
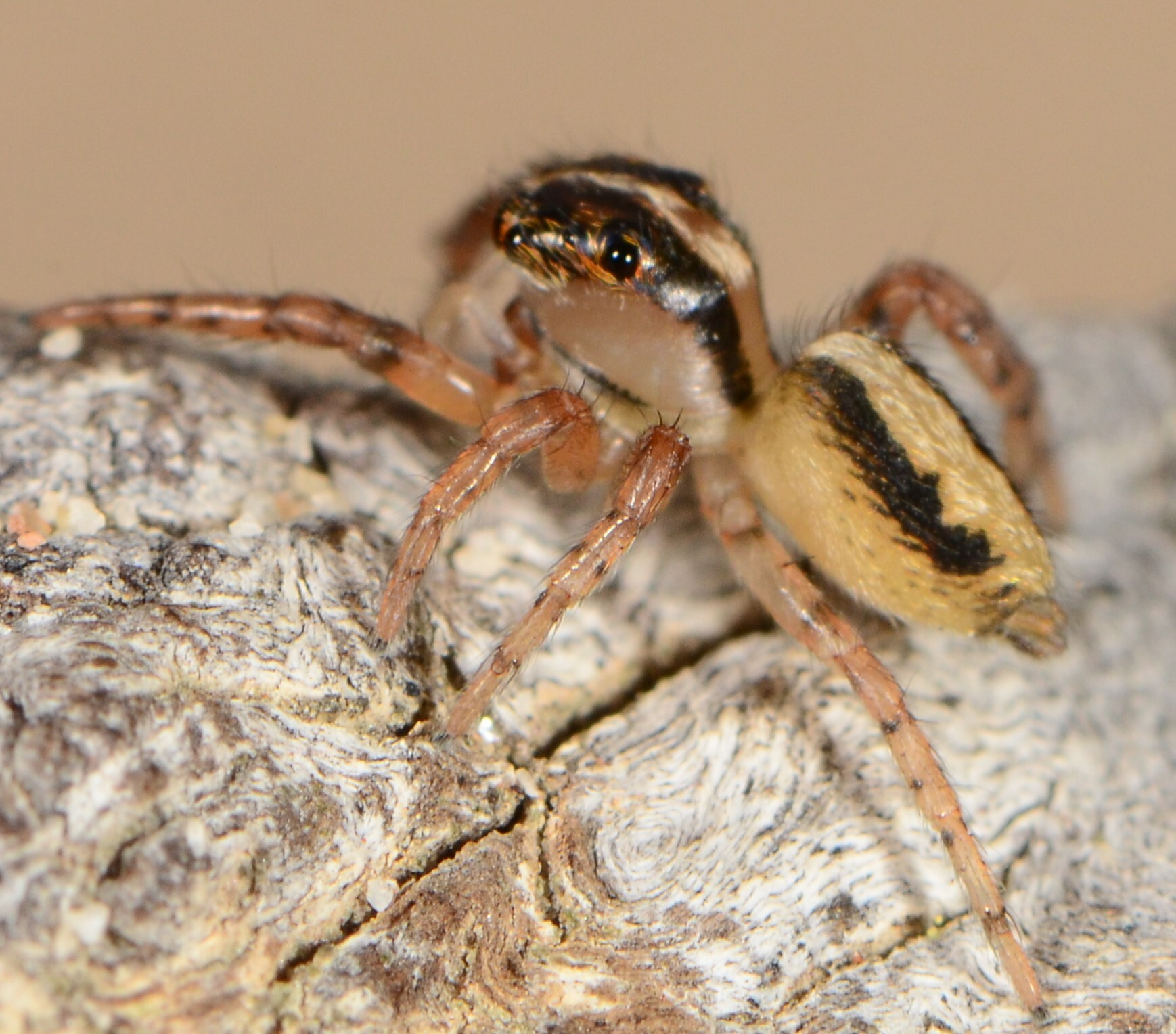
- female

Scientific classification
- Kingdom: Animalia
- Phylum: Arthropoda
- Subphylum: Chelicerata
- Class: Arachnida
- Order: Araneae
- Infraorder: Araneomorphae
- Family: Salticidae
- Genus: Euophrys
- Species: E. nana

Binomial name
- Euophrys nana Wesołowska, Azarkina & Russell-Smith, 2014

= Euophrys nana =

Species of spider

Euophrys nana is a species of jumping spider in the genus Euophrys that is endemic to South Africa. The species was first described in 2014 by Wanda Wesołowska, Galina Azarkina and Anthony Russell-Smith. It is a small spider, with a body that consists of a cephalothorax that is typically 1 mm (0.04 in) long and an abdomen that is typically 1.5 mm (0.06 in) long. The carapace, the topside of the cephalothorax is brown a central yellow stripe. The underside of the cephalothorax, or sternum, is yellowish-brown. The abdomen has a distinctive pattern of brown and white stripes around its entire body. It is this pattern that differentiates the spider from related species. The copulatory organs are also unique amongst spiders in the genus, particularly the very long thin embolus on the palpal bulb of the male. The female has not been described.

== Taxonomy ==
Euophrys nana is a species of jumping spider that was first described by Wanda Wesołowska Galina Azarkina and Anthony Russell-Smith in 2014. They allocated it to the genus Euophrys, which had been first circumscribed by Carl Ludwig Koch in 1934. It was one of over 500 species identified by the Polish arachnologist Wesołowska during her career, more than any other contemporary writer and second only to the French arachnologist Eugène Simon. The genus is named for a Greek word that can be translated "fair eyebrows". The species is named for a Latin word that reflects the small size of the spider's body.

In Wayne Maddison's 2015 study of spider phylogenetic classification, the genus Euophrys was listed to the tribe Euophryini. First circumscribed by Simon in 1901, the tribe has also been known as Euophrydinae, but the original name is now more prevalent. It is a member of a subgroup of genera called Evophrydeae after the latter name. It is a member of the clade Saltafresia. Analysis of protein-coding genes showed it was particularly related to Thorelliola. In 2016, Prószyński added the genus to a group of genera named Euopherines, named after the genus. This is a member of the supergroup of genera Euphryoida.

== Description ==
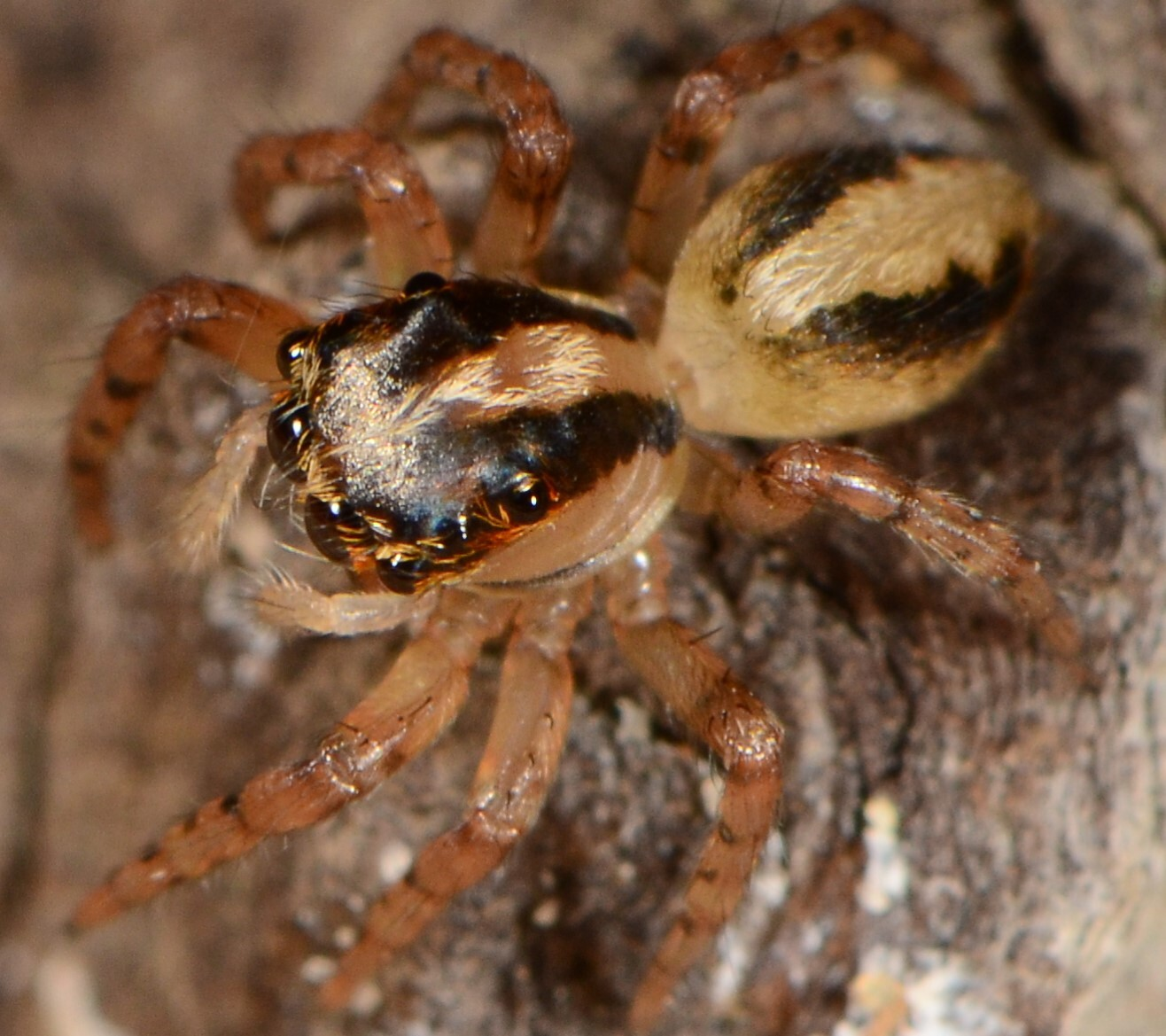
female

Euophrys nana is a small light spider with a body divided into two main parts: a broader oval cephalothorax and longer abdomen. The male has a cephalothorax that is typically 1 mm (0.04 in) long, while the abdomen is 1.5 mm (0.06 in) long, both measuring 1.1 mm (0.04 in) in width. The carapace, the hard upper part of the cephalothorax, is brown with a broad diffused yellow stripe that runs from the front to the back and a covering of white hairs. The eye field is darker with denser hairs and black rings around the eyes themselves. The underside of the cephalothorax, or sternum, is yellowish-brown, as is the spider's face, or clypeus, and chelicerae. The clypeus have occasional white hairs and brown bristles. The chelicerae has a large fang and three small teeth.

The spider's abdomen is larger and less shiny than its carapace. The top is whitish-yellow with a pattern of two brown stripes that run down from the front to back the striped pattern continues to the sides, which continue the white and brown stripes to the underside, which has a single brown stripe down the middle. It is this pattern that most easily differentiates the species from the related Euophrys subtilis. Euophrys nana has greyish-yellow covers to its book lungs and brownish-yellow spinnerets. Its legs have light yellow femora, the remainder of the front legs being brown and the other legs light yellow. The pedipalps are generally yellowish.

The spider has distinctive copulatory organs. Only the male has been described, but this is sufficient to be able to show how the species differs from other Euophrys spiders. While it has the elongated oval palpal bulb typical for the genus, the embolus that emanates from its top is very unusual. It is very thin and long, with a distinctive curve and an initial loop hidden inside a shallow indentation in the bulb. The palpal tibia is small and has a small protrusion, or tibial apophysis. The long thin nature of the embolus is key to distinguishing the spider from related species.

== Distribution and habitat ==
Euophrys spiders live across the world, although those found in North America may be accidental migrants and those in Central and South America misidentifications. In Africa, they are mainly found in the southern part of the continent. Euophrys nana is endemic to South Africa. It has been found only in Western Cape. The male holotype was discovered in 1994 near George. During the winter rain that is typical of the Mediterranean climate of the region, it can be seen in fynbos.
