= Euophrys falciger =

Conservation status
- Least Concern (IUCN 3.1)

Scientific classification
- Kingdom: Animalia
- Phylum: Arthropoda
- Subphylum: Chelicerata
- Class: Arachnida
- Order: Araneae
- Infraorder: Araneomorphae
- Family: Salticidae
- Genus: Euophrys
- Species: E. falciger

Binomial name
- Euophrys falciger Wesołowska, Azarkina & Russell-Smith, 2014

Species of jumping spider

Euophrys falciger, the Drakensberg Euophrys Jumping Spider, is a species of jumping spider in the genus Euophrys that is endemic to South Africa, living in KwaZulu-Natal. The species was first described in 2014 by Wanda Wesołowska, Galina Azarkina and Anthony Russell-Smith. Its name recalls the sickle-shaped embolus of the male. The spider is small, with a body that consists of an oval cephalothorax that measures between 1.1 and 1.9 mm (0.04 and 0.07 in) long and a narrower abdomen that is between 1.2 and 1.8 mm (0.05 and 0.07 in) long. The male is significantly larger than the female, and darker. Its carapace, the topside of the cephalothorax, is dark brown and the underside of the cephalothorax, or sternum, is black, while its abdomen is black with a pattern of light patches on top and dark underneath. In comparison, the female abdomen is greyish-brown on top and yellowish underneath, The male has generally dark brown legs, while the female's legs are greyish-yellowish. The female is similar to others in the genus, although differing in aspects of its copulatory organs. The male is easier to distinguish without close examination. For example, as well as its longer embolus, it is its smaller size that helps differentiate it from Euophrys meridionalis.

== Taxonomy ==
Euophrys falciger is a species of jumping spider, a member of the family Salticidae, that was first described by Wanda Wesołowska Galina Azarkina and Anthony Russell-Smith in 2014. They allocated it to the genus Euophrys, which had been first circumscribed by Carl Ludwig Koch in 1934. It was one of over 500 species identified by the Polish arachnologist Wesołowska during her career, more than any other contemporary writer and second only to the French arachnologist Eugène Simon. The genus is named for a Greek word that can be translated "fair eyebrows". The species is named for a Latin word that can be translated "sickle" and recalls the shape of the male spider's embolus. It is known as Drakensberg Euophrys Jumping Spider.

In Wayne Maddison's 2015 study of spider phylogenetic classification, the genus Euophrys was listed to the tribe Euophryini. First circumscribed by Simon in 1901, the tribe has also been known as Euophrydinae, but the original name is now more prevalent. It is a member of a subgroup of genera called Evophrydeae after the latter name. It is a member of the clade Saltafresia. Analysis of protein-coding genes showed it was particularly related to Thorelliola. In 2016, Prószyński added the genus to a group of genera named Euopherines, named after the genus. This is a member of the supergroup of genera Euphryoida.

== Description ==
Euophrys falciger is a small spider with a body divided into two main parts: a larger rectangular cephalothorax and a smaller oval abdomen. The male has a cephalothorax that is typically 1.9 mm (0.07 in) long and 06 mm (0.24 in) wide. Its carapace, the hard upper part of the cephalothorax, is dark brown and covered in colourless and grey hairs. The spider's eye field is black with a few long bristles near the eyes themselves. The underside of the cephalothorax, or sternum, is also black. The spider's mouthparts, including the labium and maxillae, are dark, while its chelicerae are dark brown and have two teeth to the front and one to the back.

The male's abdomen is slightly smaller than its carapace, being typically 1.8 mm (0.07 in) long and typically 1.5 mm (0.06 in) wide but differs substantially in its shape, being more oval and rounded. The top of its abdomen is black and covered in a brown hairs with a pattern light patches on the surface and a small number of chevrons towards the back. The underside is black with a patchwork of dark spots. The spider has dark spinnerets and dark brown legs, particularly the forelegs, which are nearly black with yellow parts while the remainder are mainly brown with lighter yellowish-grey patches. Its pedipalps are brown.

The female is significantly smaller than the male. It has a cephalothorax that is typically 1.1 mm (0.04 in) in length and 0.9 mm (0.04 in) in width and an abdomen that is between 1.2 mm (0.05 in) long and 0.8 mm (0.03 in) wide. It is generally lighter than the male but the carapace is otherwise similar. The abdomen has a pattern of two parallel lines on its greyish-brown top, with some examples having these broken into lines of five light patches and a plain yellowish underside. The spider's spinnerets are lighter than the male and the legs are greyish-yellow, marked with darker rings.

The spider has distinctive copulatory organs. The female epigyne has two round depressions near the front and two copulatory openings near the middle. These lead via simple insemination ducts, terminating in a knot, into rounded spermathecae, which have accessory glands attached to their sides. The male has a hairy cymbium and lumpy palpal bulb, which has a short embolus attached to the top that is shaped like a sickle. The palpal tibia has a relatively wide protuberance, or tibial apophysis, that has a ball-like end. There is also an additional small bump at the base of the male tibia reminiscent of those found in Chalcoscirtus spiders.

The spider is similar to many others in the genus. Compared to the related Euophrys difficilis, the male has a smaller lobe at the end of its palpal bulb and a longer tibial apophysis. The female has an epigyne that is similar to Euophrys gracilis but the position and shape of the depressions are different. Compared to the related Euophrys meridionalis, the spider is smaller, while the male has a longer embolus and the female narrower insemination ducts.

== Distribution and habitat ==
Euophrys spiders live across the world, although those found in North America may be accidental migrants and those in Central and South America misidentifications. In Africa, they are mainly found in the southern part of the continent. Euophrys falciger is endemic to South Africa. It has been found only in KwaZulu-Natal. The male holotype was discovered in 2011 on the Champagne Castle at an altitude of 1,550 m (5,090 ft) above sea level. Other examples were found nearby. It seems to prefer living amongst the bases of grasses and ferns that live under trees. Like many species in the genus, it lives in forested areas, particularly montane forests.
