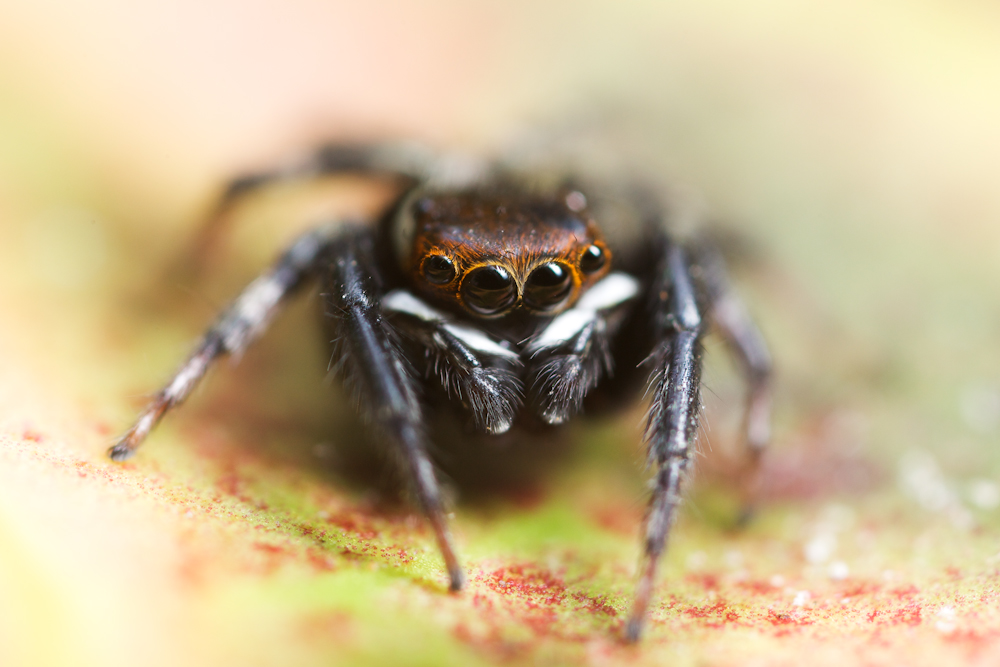
- The related Euophrys frontalis

Conservation status
- Least Concern (IUCN 3.1)

Scientific classification
- Kingdom: Animalia
- Phylum: Arthropoda
- Subphylum: Chelicerata
- Class: Arachnida
- Order: Araneae
- Infraorder: Araneomorphae
- Family: Salticidae
- Genus: Euophrys
- Species: E. meridionalis

Binomial name
- Euophrys meridionalis Wesołowska, Azarkina & Russell-Smith, 2014

= Euophrys meridionalis =

Species of spider

Euophrys meridionalis is a species of jumping spider in the genus Euophrys that is known as the Royal Natal Euophrys Jumping Spider. Endemic to South Africa, the species was first described in 2014 by Wanda Wesołowska, Galina Azarkina and Anthony Russell-Smith. It is a very small spider, smaller than most in the genus, with a body that consists of a cephalothorax that measures between 1 and 1.2 mm (0.04 and 0.05 in) long and an abdomen that is between 1 and 1.3 mm (0.05 in) long. The carapace, the topside of the cephalothorax, is dark brown and the underside of the cephalothorax, or sternum, is brownish. The pattern on the abdomen differs between the female and the male. The female has a dark surface marked with light patches, including a series of chevrons in the middle. The male has a plain brown scutum in the top but a yellowish-grey or blackish underside with a pattern light dotted lines. The male has generally brown legs, apart from the front pair, which are black and yellow, while the female's legs are all yellowish with some brown parts. The male has a longer embolus than Euophrys falciger, but it otherwise similar, apart from its size.

== Taxonomy ==
Euophrys meridionalis is a species of jumping spider that was first described by Wanda Wesołowska Galina Azarkina and Anthony Russell-Smith in 2014. They allocated it to the genus Euophrys, which had been first circumscribed by Carl Ludwig Koch in 1934. It was one of over 500 species identified by the Polish arachnologist Wesołowska during her career, more than any other contemporary writer and second only to the French arachnologist Eugène Simon. The genus is named for a Greek word that can be translated "fair eyebrows". The species is named for a Latin word that can be translated "southern" and recalls the distribution of the spider. It is known as Royal Natal Euophrys Jumping Spider.

In Wayne Maddison's 2015 study of spider phylogenetic classification, the genus Euophrys was listed to the tribe Euophryini. First circumscribed by Simon in 1901, the tribe has also been known as Euophrydinae, but the original name is now more prevalent. It is a member of a subgroup of genera called Evophrydeae after the latter name. It is a member of the clade Saltafresia. Analysis of protein-coding genes showed it was particularly related to Thorelliola. In 2016, Prószyński added the genus to a group of genera named Euopherines, named after the genus. This is a member of the supergroup of genera Euphryoida.

== Description ==
Euophrys meridionalis is a very small spider with a body divided into two main parts: a rounded rectangular cephalothorax and an oval abdomen. Its smaller size than other species in the genus helps distinguish it. The male has a cephalothorax that is typically 1 mm (0.04 in) long and 06 mm (0.24 in) wide. The carapace, the hard upper part of the cephalothorax, is dark brown with a black, slightly pitted eye field. There are a few brown bristles near the eyes themselves. The underside of the cephalothorax, or sternum, is brownish, as are the mouthparts, including the labium. The chelicerae are orange and have two teeth to the front and one to the back.

The male's abdomen is similar in dimensions to its carapace but differs substantially in its shape, being substantially more rounded. The top is a lighter brown and covered in a delicate hairless scutum white the underside is either yellowish-grey or blackish with a pattern of light dots forming four lines. The spider has light spinnerets. Its front legs are black with yellow parts while the remainder are mainly brown with lighter yellowish-grey patches. The pedipalps are brown to orange and covered in dark hairs.

The female is slightly larger than the male. It has a cephalothorax that is ranges between 1.1 and 1.2 mm (0.04 and 0.05 in) in length and 0.7 and 0.8 mm (0.03 and 0.03 in) in width. The carapace is similar to the male but the abdomen is very different. It is between 1.1 and 1.3 mm (0.04 and 0.05 in) long and 0.8 and 0.9 mm (0.03 and 0.04 in) wide. It is a similar brown to the carapace, with two large patches to the front, two stripes that look like a succession of chevrons in an indented pattern in the middle and a series of diamonds to the rear, all lighter. The pattern is typical for the genus. The bottom is yellowish. The legs are all yellowish with some parts brown.

The spider has distinctive copulatory organs. The female epigyne has slight evidence of sclerotization and two shallow depressions. It has two copulatory openings placed to the sides that lead to simple insemination ducts, spermathecae and accessory glands. The male has a yellow cymbium and palpal bulb, both covered in dark hairs. The palpal tibia has a relatively wide spike, or tibial apophysis. The palpal bulb is rounded with spermatophore winding through it and a sickle-shaped embolus at its top. The spider is similar to the related Euophrys falciger, but the embolus is longer.

== Distribution and habitat ==
Euophrys spiders live across the world, although those found in North America may be accidental migrants and those in Central and South America misidentifications. In Africa, they are mainly found in the southern part of the continent. Euophrys meridionalis is endemic to South Africa. It has been found only in the eastern part of Free State and western part of KwaZulu-Natal. The male holotype was discovered in 1977 in the Royal Natal National Park. The first of the species to be found in Free State were three males and a female near Harrismith in Platberg Nature Reserve during 2012. Other examples have been found near Drakensberg and Lüneburg. The spider thrives in Afromontane forest, but has also been discovered living in plantations of Eucalyptus trees.
