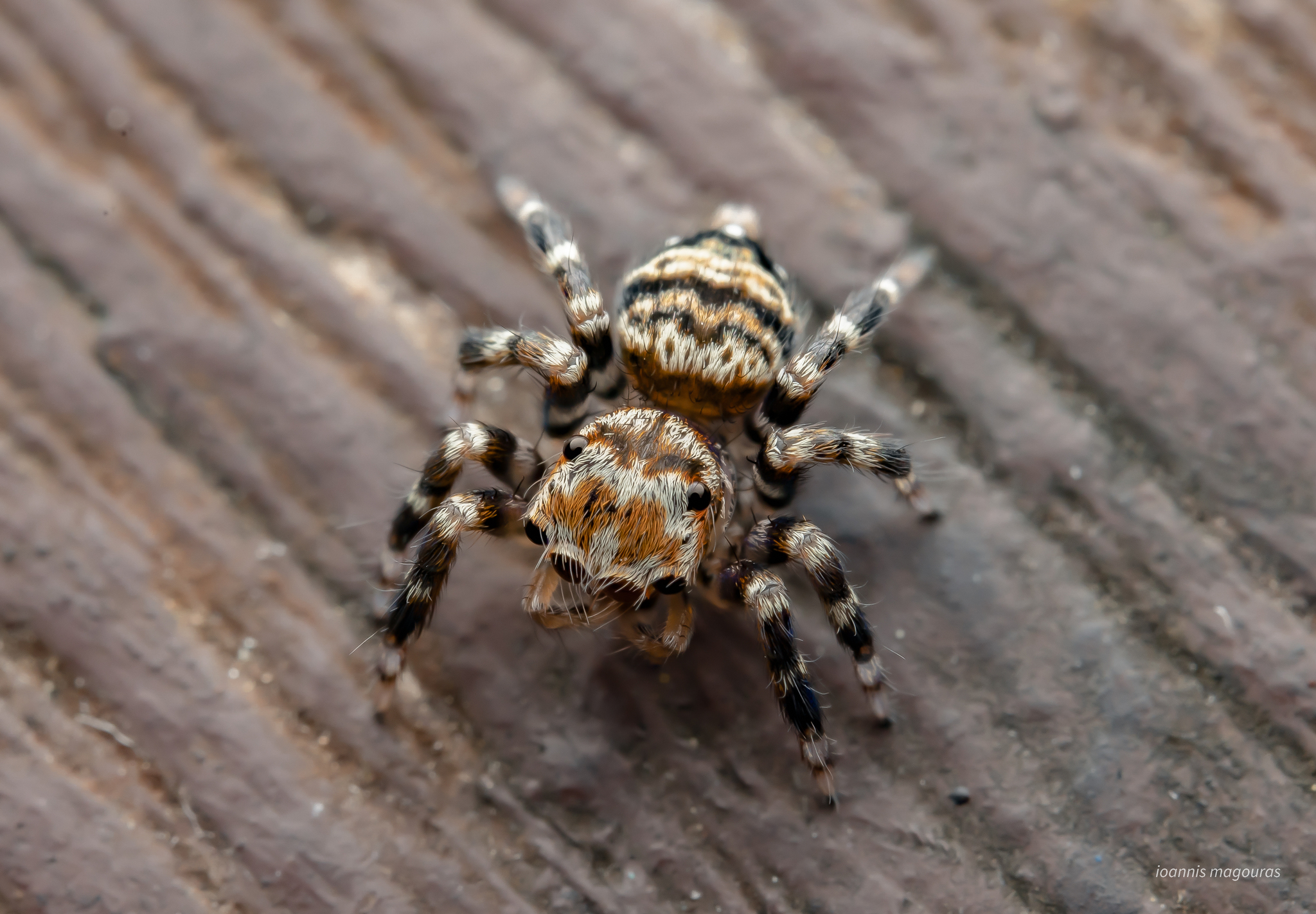
- Female from Singapore
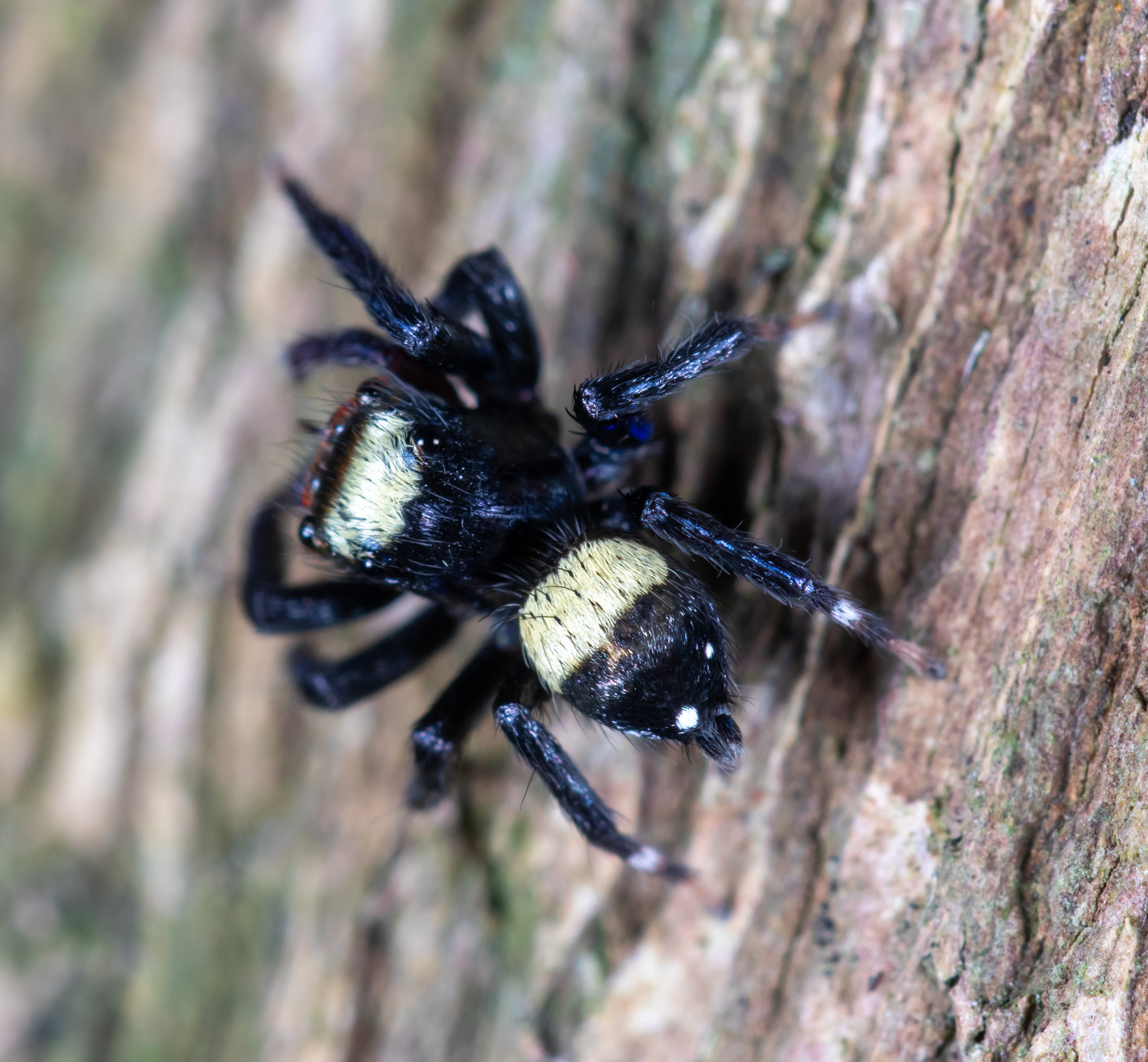
- Male from Malaysia

Scientific classification
- Kingdom: Animalia
- Phylum: Arthropoda
- Subphylum: Chelicerata
- Class: Arachnida
- Order: Araneae
- Infraorder: Araneomorphae
- Family: Salticidae
- Genus: Thorelliola
- Species: T. ensifera

Binomial name
- Thorelliola ensifera (Thorell, 1877)

Synonyms
- Plexippus ensifer Thorell, 1877; Thorellia ensifer (Thorell, 1877); Hasarius ensifer (Thorell, 1877); Thorellia ensifera (Thorell, 1877)

= Thorelliola ensifera =

Species of spider

Thorelliola ensifera is a species of jumping spider of the genus Thorelliola. Originally native to Southeast Asia, it has been widely introduced to tropical islands across the Pacific Ocean.

== Taxonomy ==
The species was first described by Tamerlan Thorell in 1877 as Plexippus ensifer based on a male specimen from Sulawesi (then Celebes). The female was described the following year from Ambon Island.

The species was subsequently transferred to the genus Thorellia by Eugen von Keyserling in 1882, and later to the genus Hasarius by Thorell himself in 1892. The current generic placement in Thorelliola was established by Embrik Strand in 1942 as a replacement name.

== Distribution ==
T. ensifera is native to Vietnam, Malaysia, Singapore, and Indonesia. The species has been widely introduced to Pacific islands, including French Polynesia (Marquesas Islands, Society Islands, Tuamotu), Hawaii, and Samoa.

== Description ==
Thorelliola ensifera is a medium-sized jumping spider with distinctive sexual dimorphism.

=== Male ===
The male, as originally described by Thorell in 1877, has a body length of approximately 5.25 mm. The most distinctive feature is the presence of two very long, slender spines on the clypeus that curve upward and are pressed closely together from base to tip, appearing almost as a single thickened spine. The cephalothorax is reddish-brown to blackish, with yellow pubescence covering the eye area and sides of the head below the eyes.

The abdomen displays a complex color pattern: the anterior portion is testaceous with dense yellow pubescence, followed by an undulating black transverse band near the middle, then a yellowish transverse band. The posterior end is broadly black with three small white spots arranged in a curved line above the spinnerets. The legs are dark testaceous-brown with blackish rings, particularly prominent on the front legs, with testaceous tarsi.

=== Female ===
The female, described by Thorell in 1878 from Ambon, is smaller at about 4.3 mm in length. Females completely lack the prominent clypeal spines characteristic of males, with the clypeus height barely equaling half the diameter of the largest eye. The cephalothorax is blackish-brown with the eye area lighter and covered with yellowish pubescence.

The abdominal pattern is testaceous with an irregular blackish transverse line, followed by a broad yellowish transverse band that is very irregular posteriorly and separated from the anterior area by a black transverse line through the middle of the dorsum. The apex is broadly black with three white spots. The legs are testaceous-brown with testaceous tips, and the posterior legs show distinct blackish rings.
