= Thorelliola javaensis =

Scientific classification
- Kingdom: Animalia
- Phylum: Arthropoda
- Subphylum: Chelicerata
- Class: Arachnida
- Order: Araneae
- Infraorder: Araneomorphae
- Family: Salticidae
- Genus: Thorelliola
- Species: T. javaensis

Binomial name
- Thorelliola javaensis Gardzińska & Patoleta, 1997

Species of spider

Thorelliola javaensis is a species of jumping spider in the genus Thorelliola that is endemic to Java.
