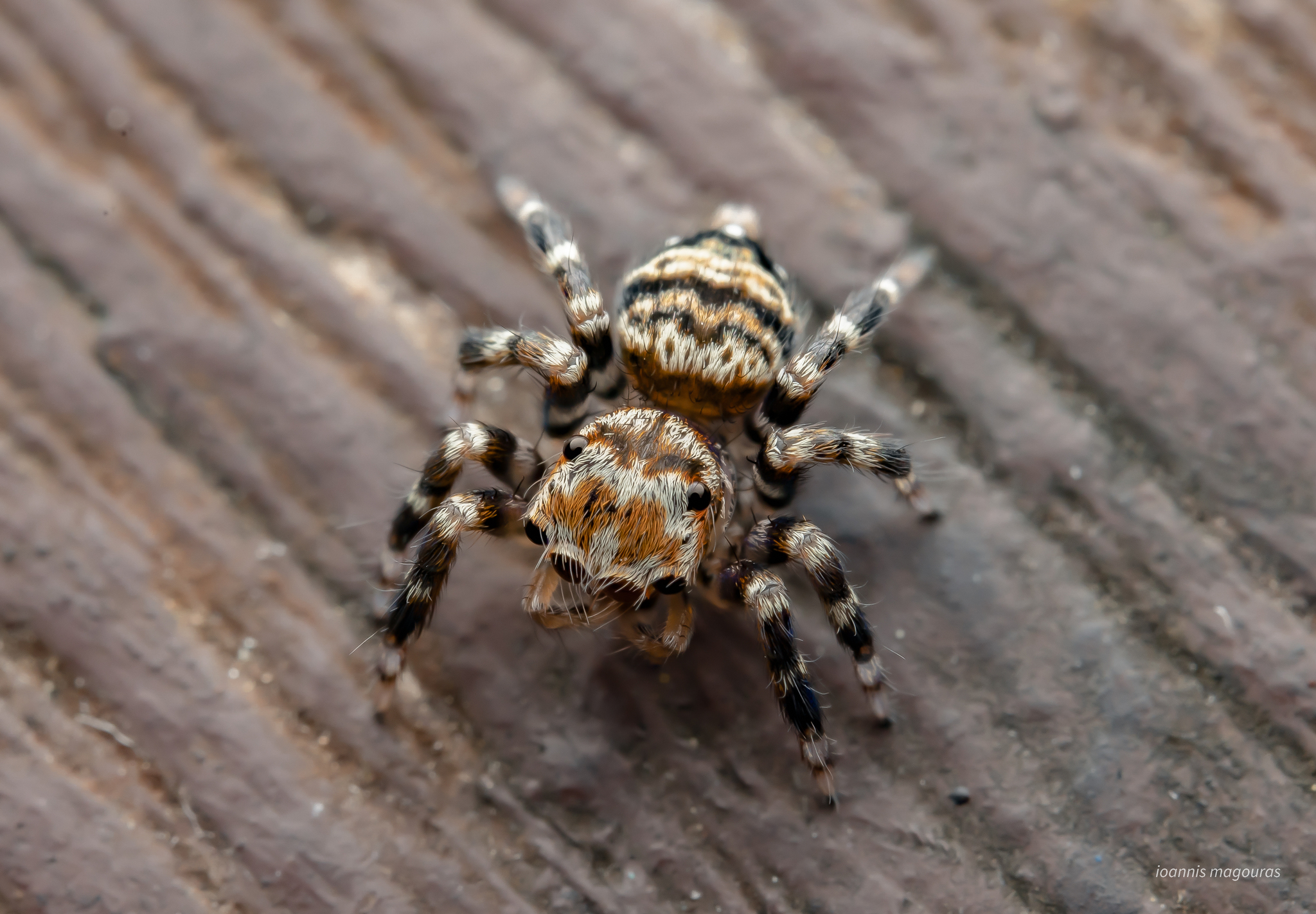
- female T. ensifera
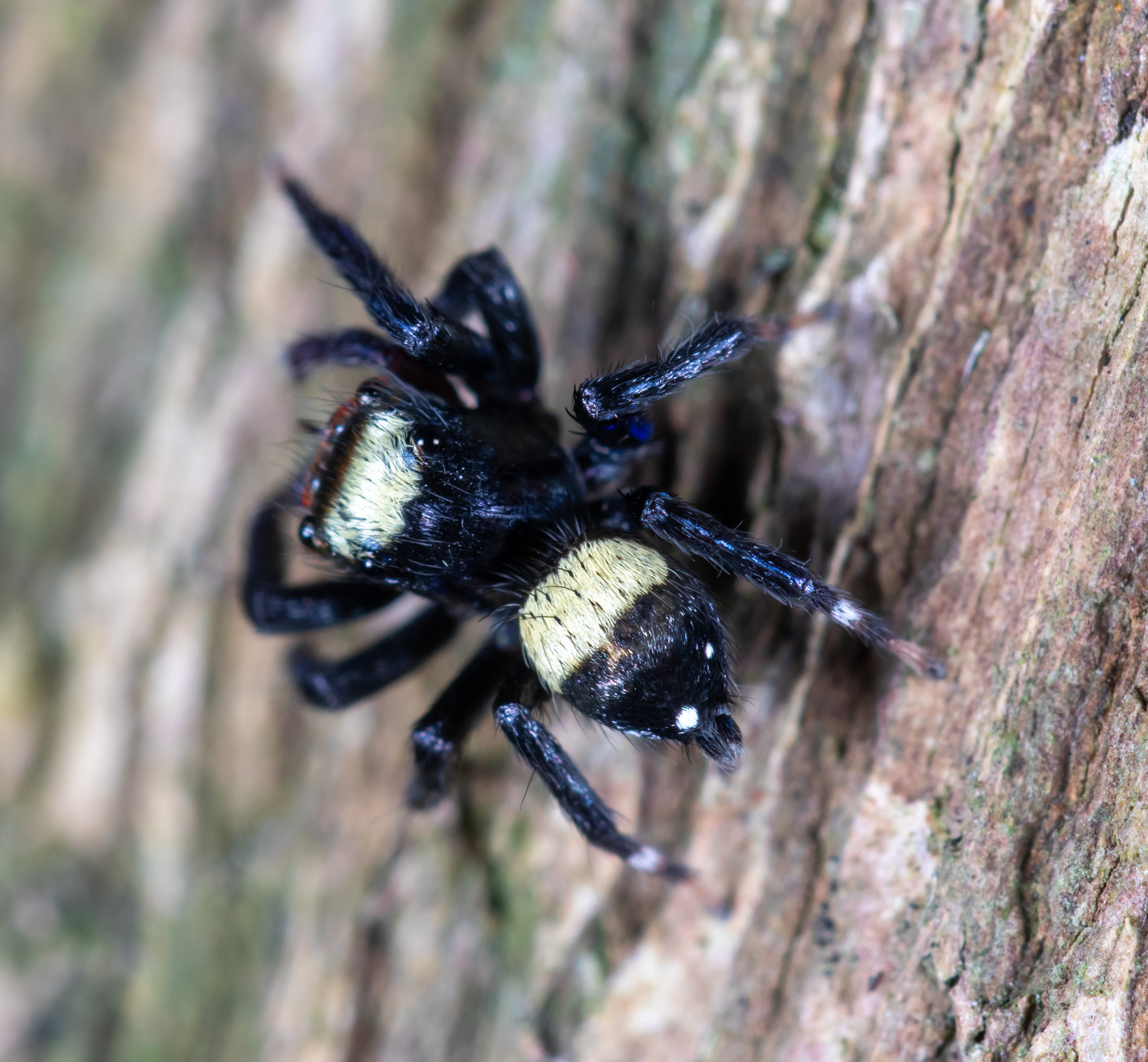
- male T. ensifera

Scientific classification
- Kingdom: Animalia
- Phylum: Arthropoda
- Subphylum: Chelicerata
- Class: Arachnida
- Order: Araneae
- Infraorder: Araneomorphae
- Family: Salticidae
- Subfamily: Salticinae
- Genus: Thorelliola; Strand, 1942

Type species
- T. ensifera (Thorell, 1877)

Species
- 19, see text

= Thorelliola =

Genus of spiders

Thorelliola is a genus of jumping spiders that was first described by Embrik Strand in 1942. It is named after arachnologist Tamerlan Thorell.

== Species ==
As of August 2019 it contains nineteen species, found in Asia, on the Marshall Islands, in Kiribati, Papua New Guinea, and on the Polynesian Islands:

- Thorelliola aliena Zhang & Maddison, 2012 – New Guinea
- Thorelliola biapophysis Gardzinska & Patoleta, 1997 – Indonesia (Banda Is.)
- Thorelliola crebra Zhang & Maddison, 2012 – New Guinea
- Thorelliola cyrano Szűts & De Bakker, 2004 – New Guinea
- Thorelliola dissimilis Gardzińska, 2009 – New Guinea
- Thorelliola doryphora (Thorell, 1881) – New Guinea
- Thorelliola dumicola Berry, Beatty & Prószyński, 1997 – Caroline Is.
- Thorelliola ensifera (Thorell, 1877) (type) – Malaysia to Sulawesi, Hawaii, French Polynesia (Marquesas Is., Society Is., Tuamotu)
- Thorelliola glabra Gardzinska & Patoleta, 1997 – Indonesia (Banda Is.)
- Thorelliola javaensis Gardzinska & Patoleta, 1997 – Indonesia (Java)
- Thorelliola joannae Zhang & Maddison, 2012 – New Guinea
- Thorelliola mahunkai Szüts, 2002 – New Guinea
- Thorelliola monoceros (Karsch, 1881) – Marshall Is.
- Thorelliola pallidula Gardzińska, 2009 – New Guinea
- Thorelliola squamosa Zhang & Maddison, 2012 – New Guinea
- Thorelliola tamasi Zhang & Maddison, 2012 – New Guinea
- Thorelliola truncilonga Gardzinska & Patoleta, 1997 – New Guinea
- Thorelliola tualapa Zhang & Maddison, 2012 – New Guinea
- Thorelliola zabkai Zhang & Maddison, 2012 – New Guinea
