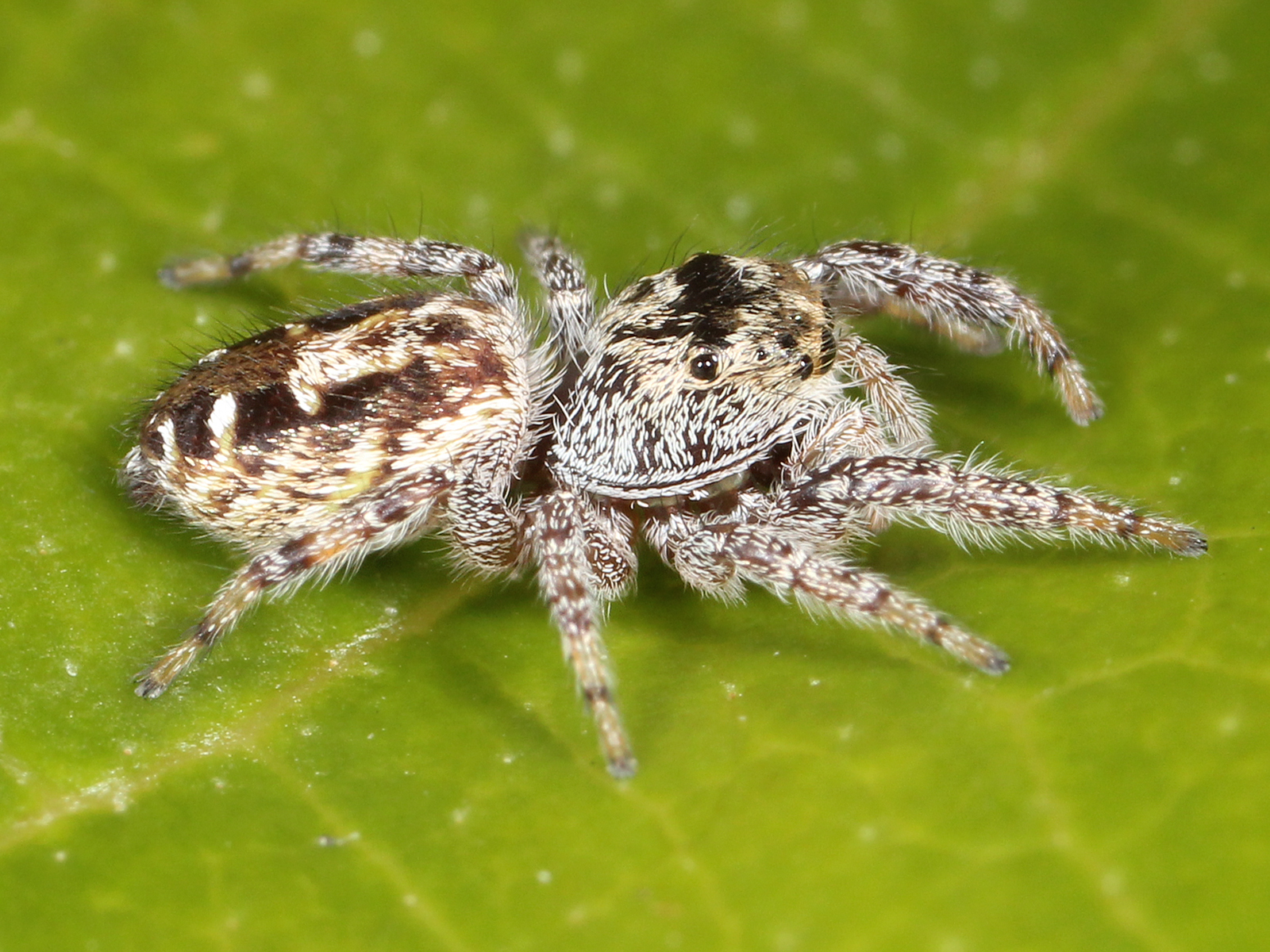
- Female

Scientific classification
- Kingdom: Animalia
- Phylum: Arthropoda
- Subphylum: Chelicerata
- Class: Arachnida
- Order: Araneae
- Infraorder: Araneomorphae
- Family: Salticidae
- Genus: Pelegrina
- Species: P. aeneola

Binomial name
- Pelegrina aeneola (Curtis, 1892)

= Pelegrina aeneola =

Species of spider

Pelegrina aeneola (sometimes referred to as “coppered white-cheeked jumping spider”) is a species of jumping spider in the family Salticidae. It is found in North America. Not much is known about this species.

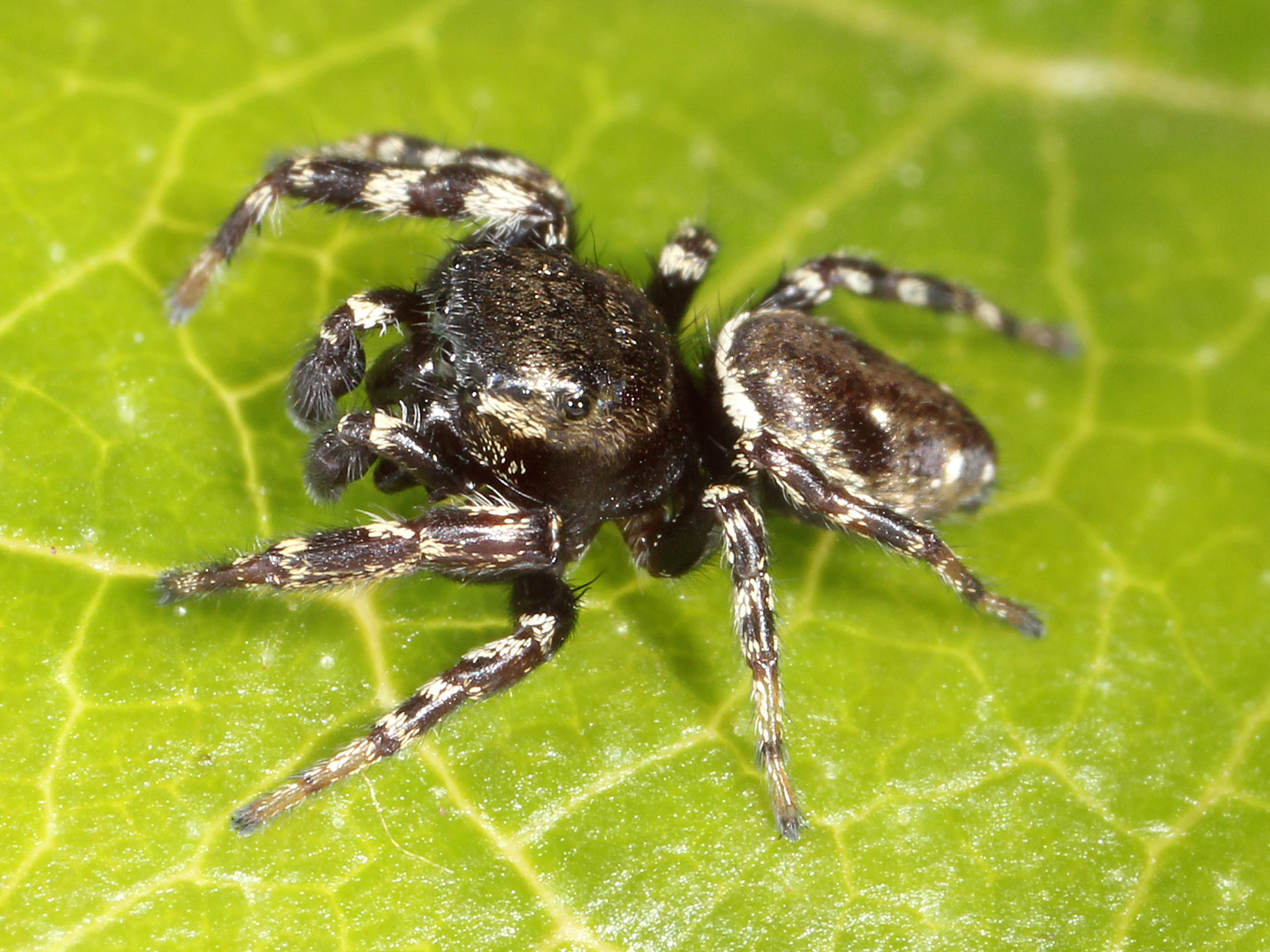
Male

== Description ==
=== Coloring ===
Females are mostly white with brown on the top of their abdomen, black on their forehead and some brown markings on their legs.

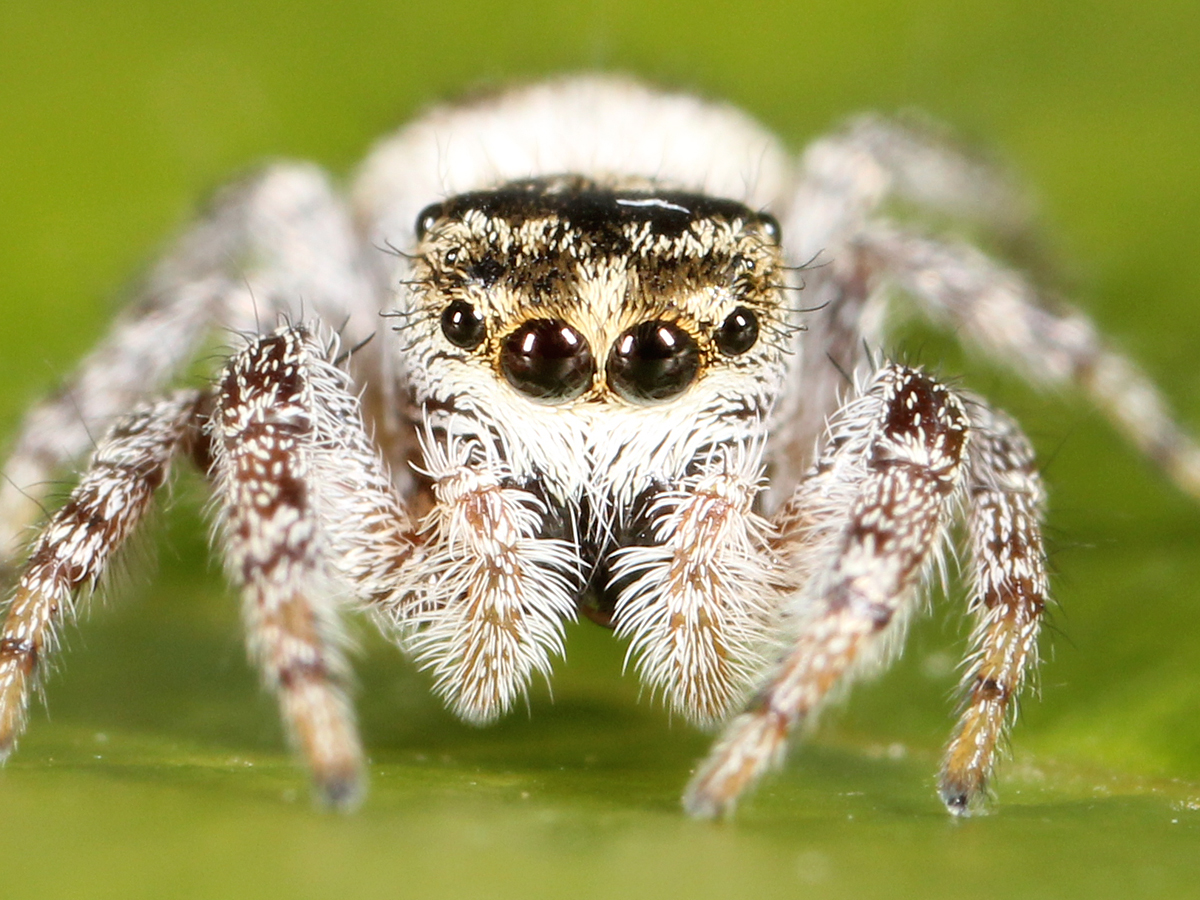
Female

Males on the other hand have black legs and pedipalps, a dark brown carapace, a lighter brown abdomen and white markings on their pedipalps legs and abdomen.

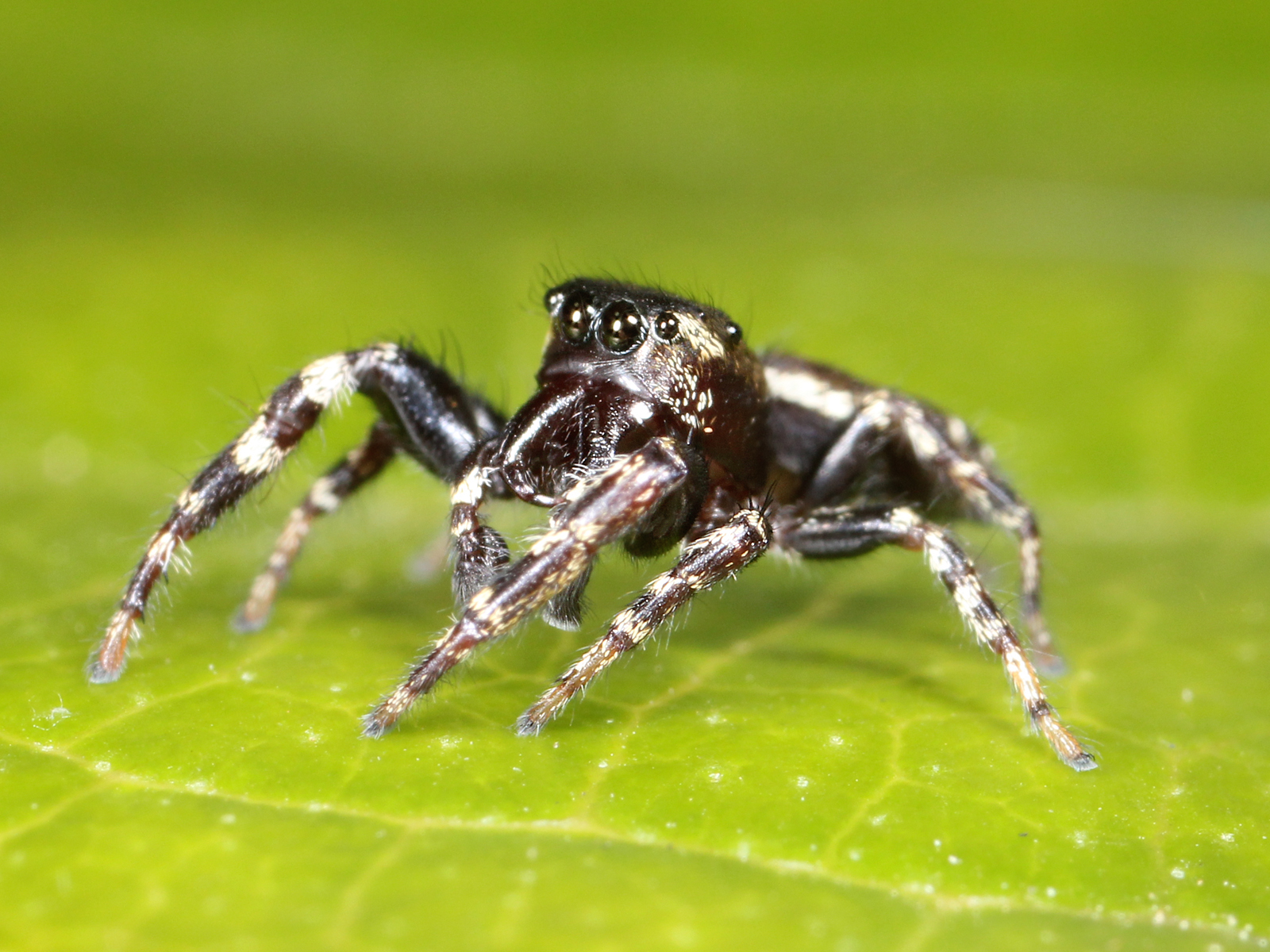
Male

=== Size ===
Like all jumping spiders Pelegrina aeneola is sexually dimorphic. Females are 5.5 millimeters while the slightly smaller males are 5 millimeters long.

== Distribution ==
Pelegrina aeneola are found in diverse vegetations throughout western North America.

== Diet ==
Pelegrina aeneola has been seen eating insect eggs.

== Gallery ==
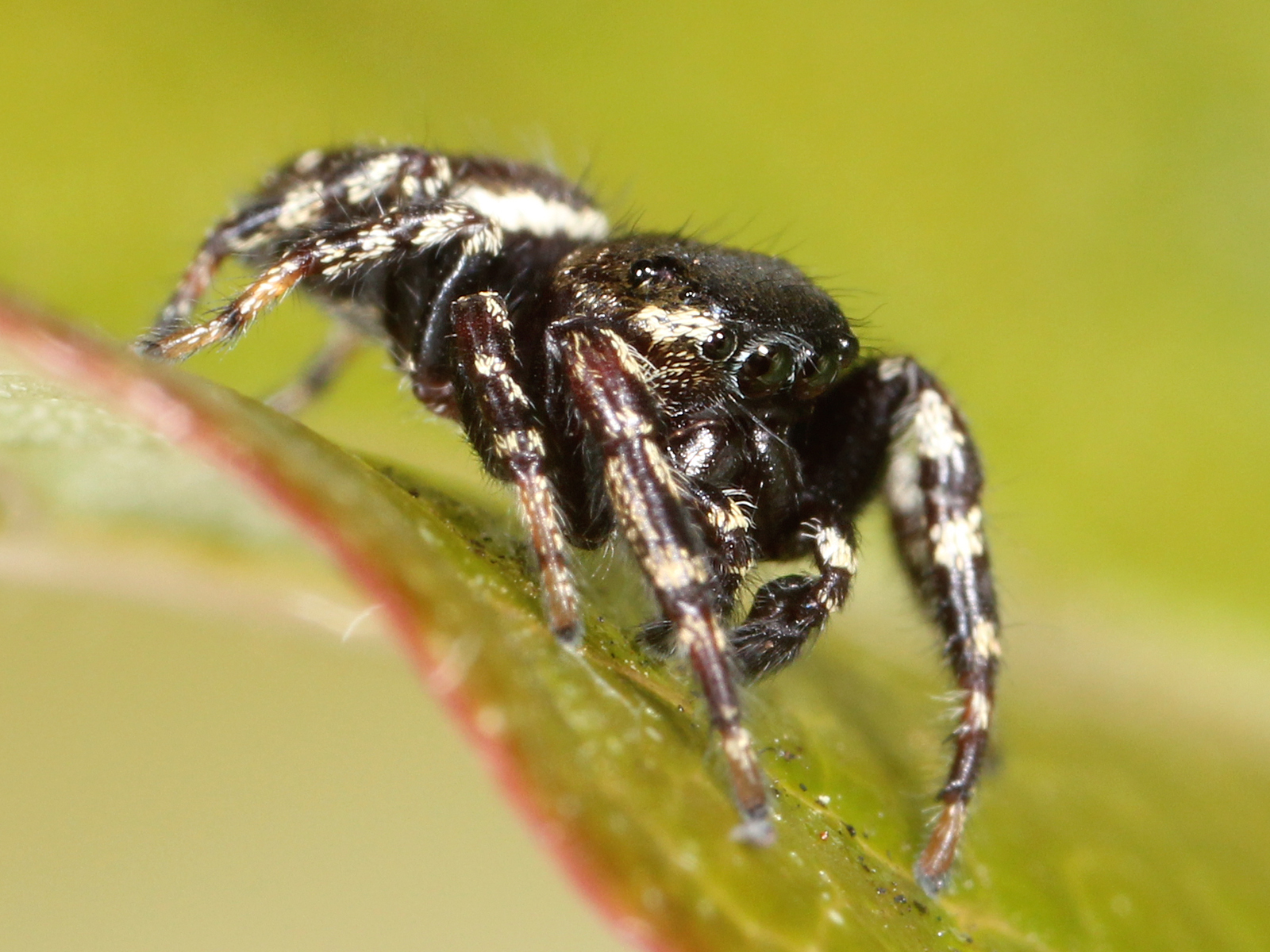
Male

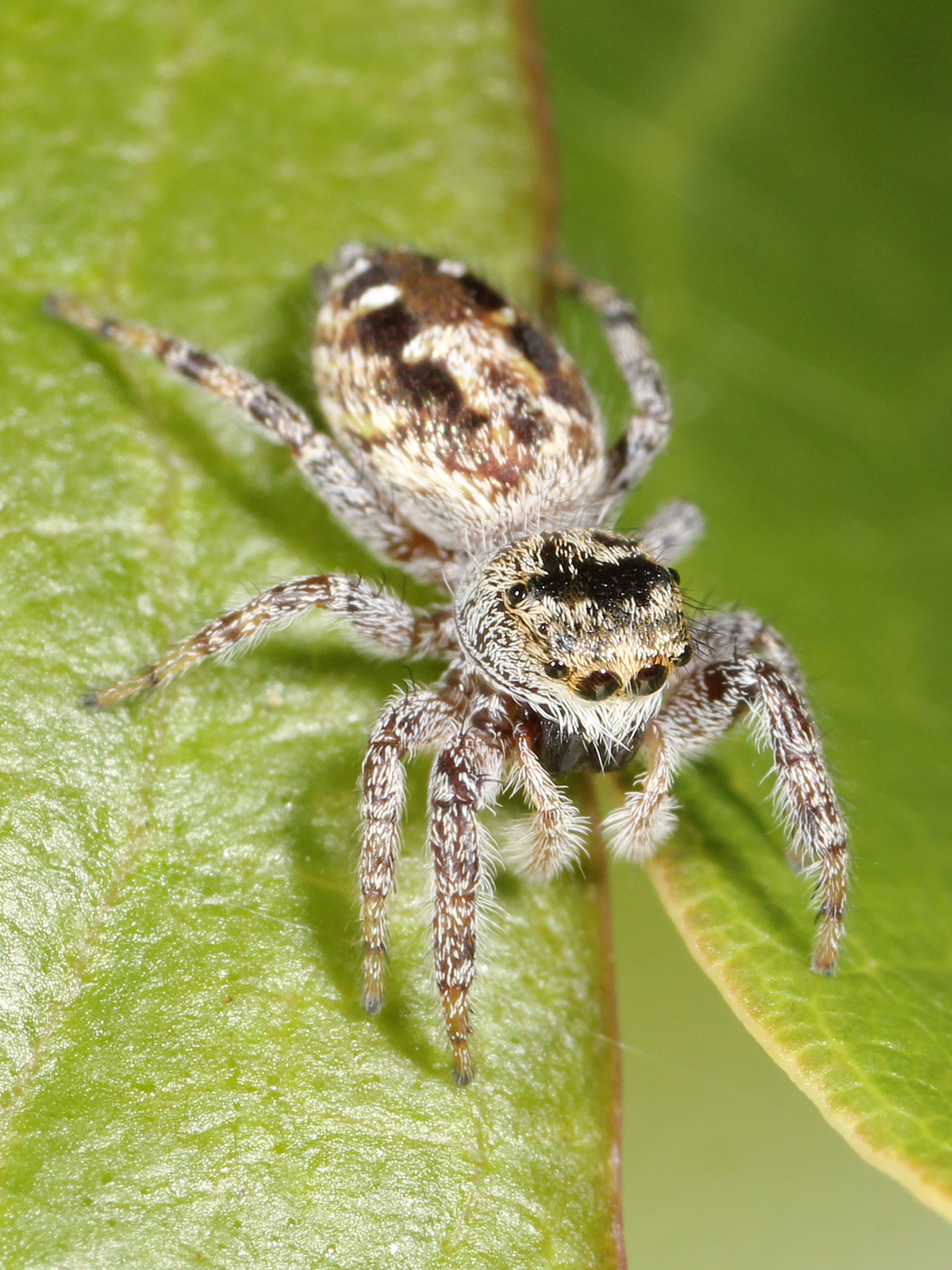
Female

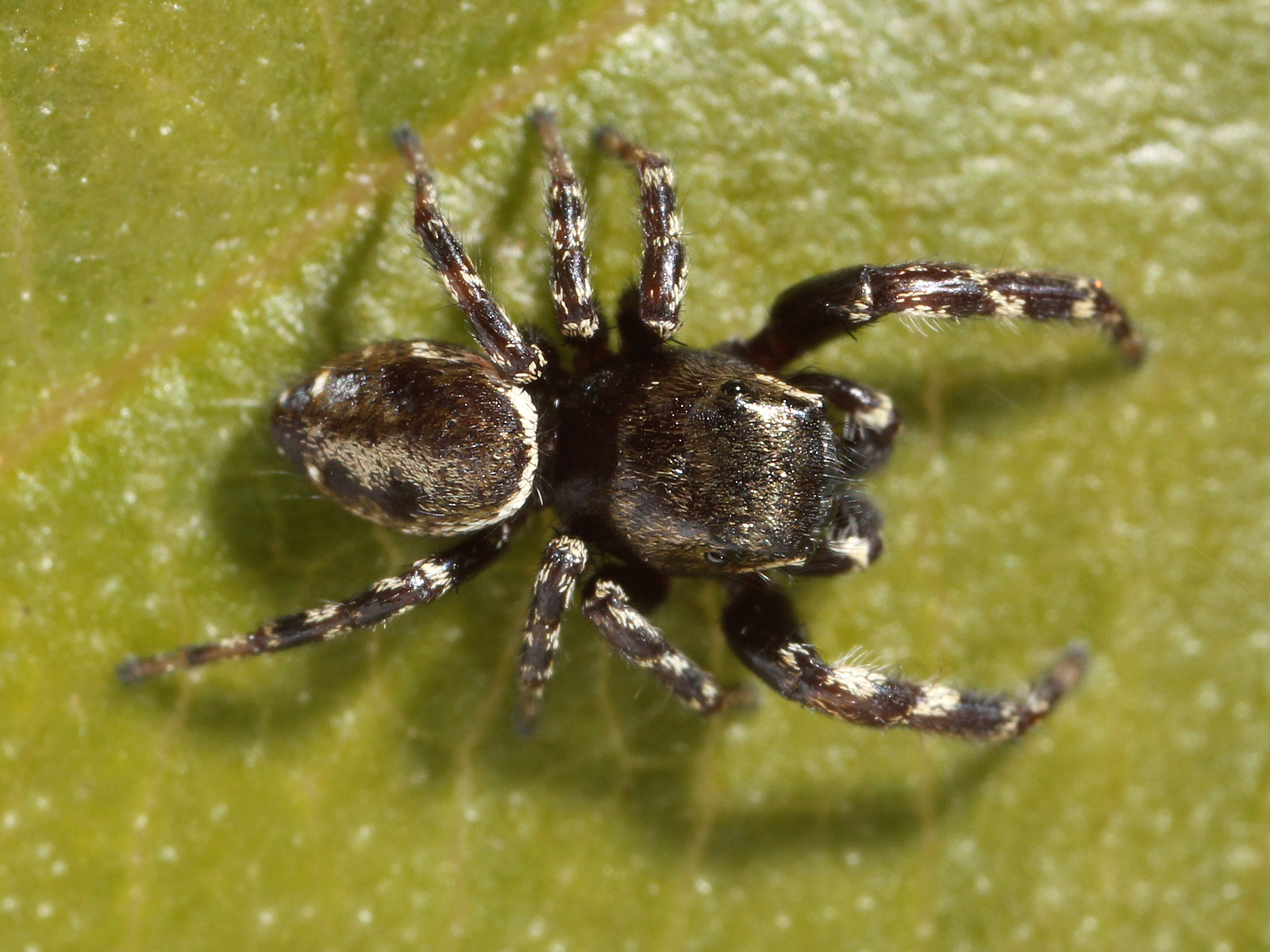
Male

== Related species ==
- Pelegrina proterva
- Pelegrina galathea
- Pelegrina tillandsiae
- Pelegrina insignis
- Pelegrina flavipes
- Pelegrina exigua
