= S. cyaneus =

S. cyaneus may refer to:

- Sassacus cyaneus, a jumping spider species native to Sonora in Mexico and parts of the United States
- Sirex cyaneus, the blue horntail, a wasp species native to Alberta, Canada
- Streptomyces cyaneus, an actinobacterium species
