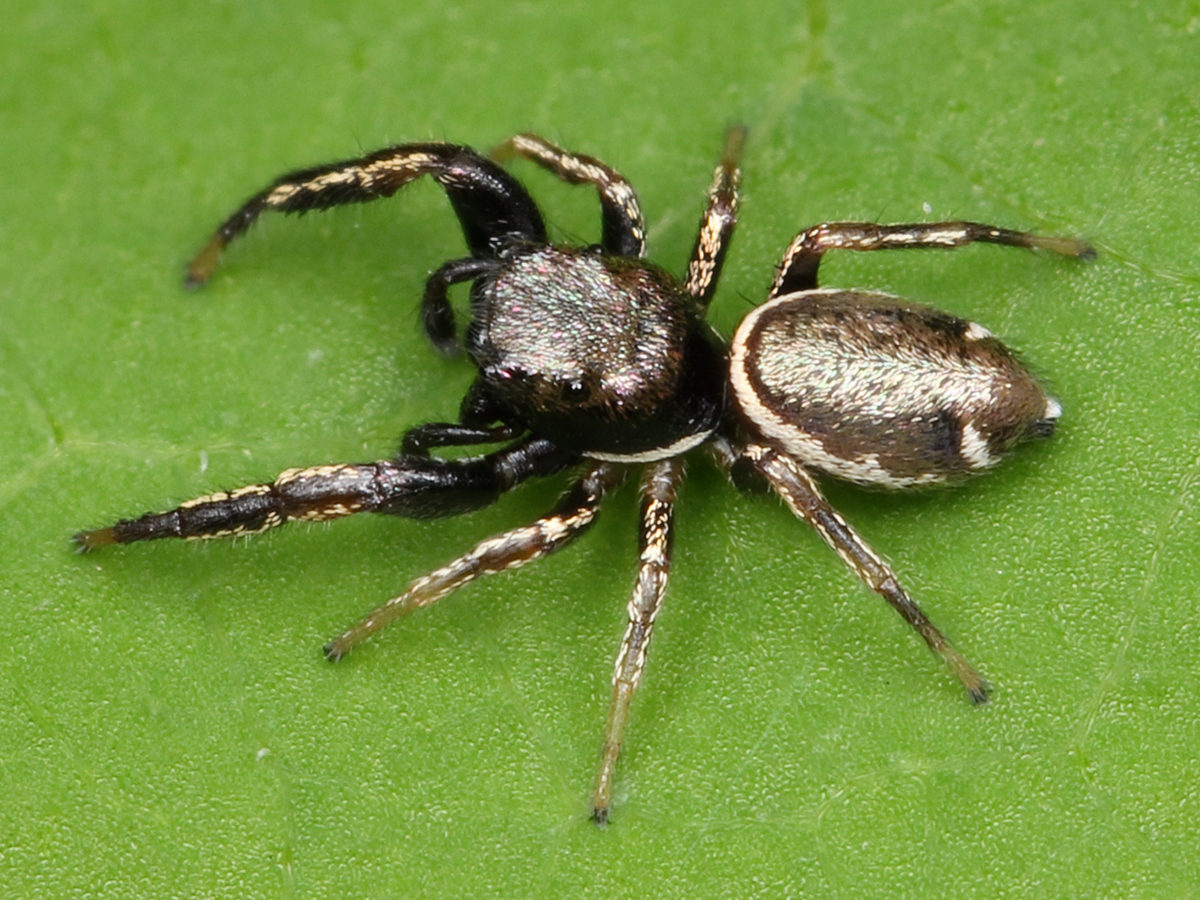
- Male Sassacus vitis
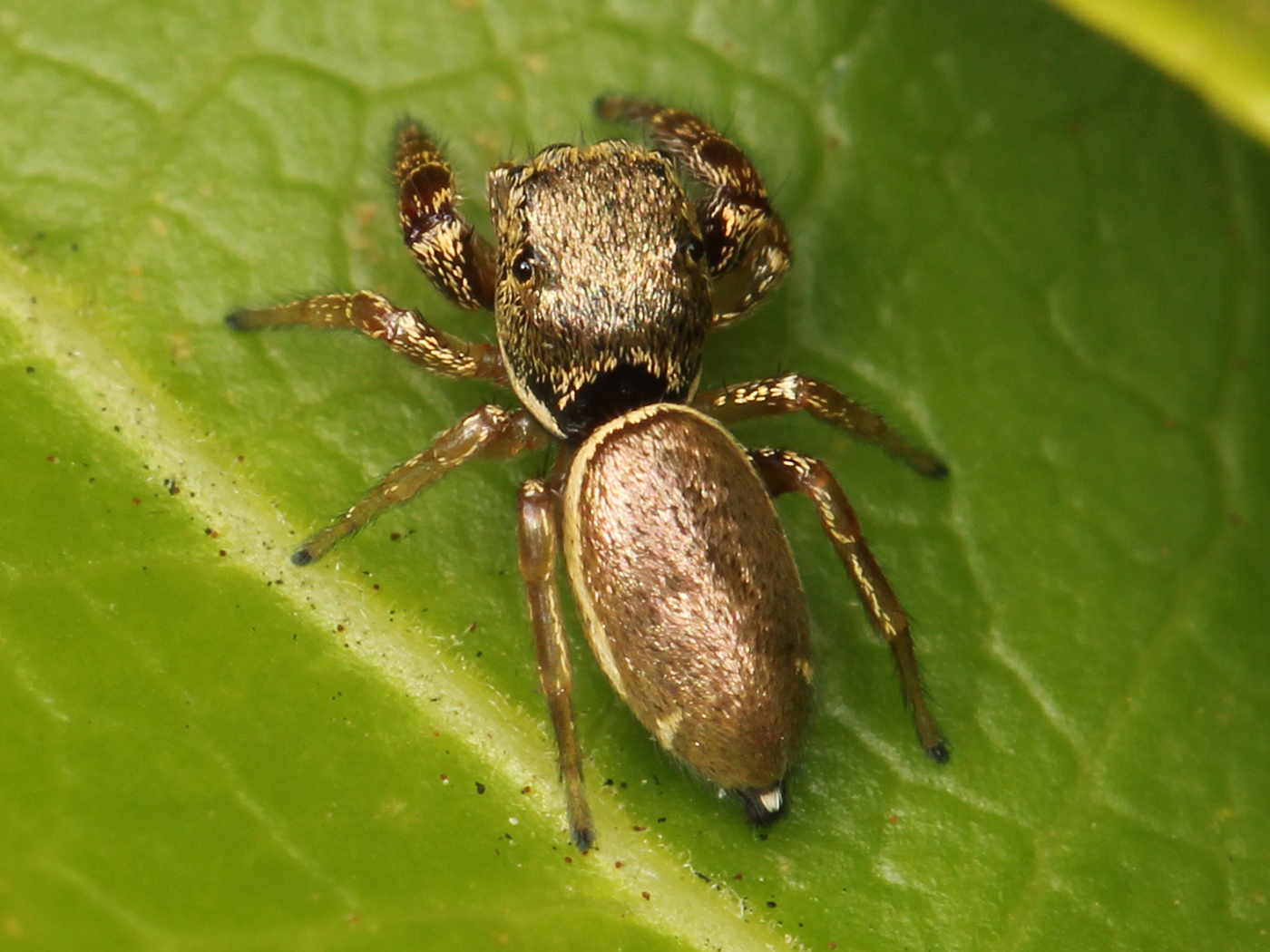
- Female Sassacus vitis

Scientific classification
- Kingdom: Animalia
- Phylum: Arthropoda
- Subphylum: Chelicerata
- Class: Arachnida
- Order: Araneae
- Infraorder: Araneomorphae
- Family: Salticidae
- Genus: Sassacus
- Species: S. vitis

Binomial name
- Sassacus vitis (Cockerell, 1894)

Synonyms
- Dendryphantes vitis Icius vitis Dendryphantes melanomerus Dendryphantes apachecus Dendryphantes mathetes Metaphidippus mathetes Dendryphantes melanomerus Metaphidippus vitis

= Sassacus vitis =

Species of spider

Sassacus vitis is a species of jumping spider. It is native to North America, with a range spanning from Canada to Panama. These spiders are normally no larger than five millimetres, with females being much larger than males, and duller in color.
