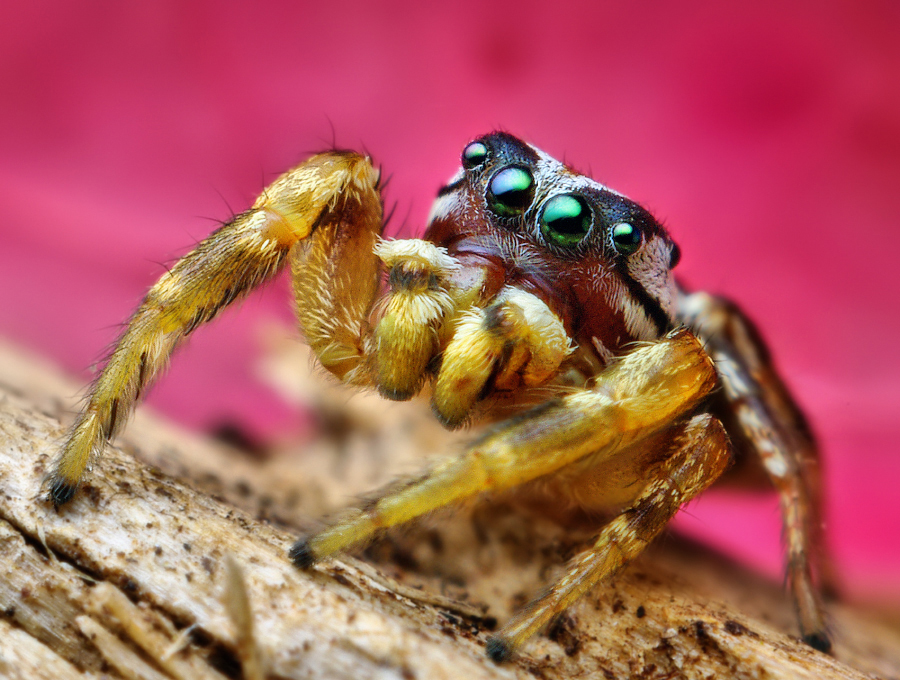
- Adult male Pelegrina pervaga

Scientific classification
- Kingdom: Animalia
- Phylum: Arthropoda
- Subphylum: Chelicerata
- Class: Arachnida
- Order: Araneae
- Infraorder: Araneomorphae
- Family: Salticidae
- Subfamily: Salticinae
- Genus: Pelegrina; Franganillo, 1930

Type species
- Dendryphantes proximus Peckham & Peckham, 1901

Species
- See text.

Diversity
- 38 species

= Pelegrina =

Genus of spiders

Pelegrina is a genus of spiders in the jumping spider family Salticidae. They are found throughout North America. Many of the species in the genus Pelegrina were previously placed in the genus Metaphidippus, and before that, in Dendryphantes. The genus was erected in 1930 by the Spanish arachnologist Pelegrín Franganillo Balboa, who named it after himself.

== Species ==
As of July 2024, the World Spider Catalog accepted the following species:

- Pelegrina aeneola (Curtis, 1892) – North America
- Pelegrina arizonensis (Peckham & Peckham, 1901) – North America
- Pelegrina balia Maddison, 1996 – United States
- Pelegrina bicuspidata (F. O. P-Cambridge, 1901) – Mexico, Guatemala
- Pelegrina bunites Maddison, 1996 – United States, Mexico
- Pelegrina chaimona Maddison, 1996 – United States, Mexico
- Pelegrina chalceola Maddison, 1996 – United States
- Pelegrina clavator Maddison, 1996 – Mexico
- Pelegrina clemata (Levi, 1951) – United States, Canada
- Pelegrina dithalea Maddison, 1996 – United States
- Pelegrina edrilana Maddison, 1996 – Mexico
- Pelegrina exigua (Banks, 1892) – United States
- Pelegrina flaviceps (Kaston, 1973) – United States, Canada
- Pelegrina flavipes (Peckham & Peckham, 1888) – United States, Canada
- Pelegrina furcata (F. O. P.-Cambridge, 1901) – United States, Mexico
- Pelegrina galathea (Walckenaer, 1837) – Canada to Costa Rica, Bermuda
- Pelegrina helenae (Banks, 1921) – United States
- Pelegrina huachuca Maddison, 1996 – United States
- Pelegrina insignis (Banks, 1892) – United States, Canada
- Pelegrina kastoni Maddison, 1996 – United States, Mexico
- Pelegrina montana (Emerton, 1891) – United States, Canada
- Pelegrina morelos Maddison, 1996 – Mexico
- Pelegrina neoleonis Maddison, 1996 – Mexico
- Pelegrina ochracea (F. O. P.-Cambridge, 1901) – Mexico, Guatemala
- Pelegrina orestes Maddison, 1996 – United States, Mexico
- Pelegrina pallidata (F. O. P.-Cambridge, 1901) – Mexico to Nicaragua
- Pelegrina peckhamorum (Kaston, 1973) – United States
- Pelegrina pervaga (Peckham & Peckham, 1909) – United States
- Pelegrina proterva (Walckenaer, 1837) – United States, Canada
- Pelegrina proxima (Peckham & Peckham, 1901) – Bahamas, Cuba, Hispaniola, Jamaica
- Pelegrina sabinema Maddison, 1996 – United States
- Pelegrina sandaracina Maddison, 1996 – Mexico to Nicaragua
- Pelegrina tillandsiae (Kaston, 1973) – United States
- Pelegrina tristis Maddison, 1996 – United States
- Pelegrina variegata (F. O. P.-Cambridge, 1901) – Mexico to Panama
- Pelegrina verecunda (Chamberlin & Gertsch, 1930) – United States, Mexico
- Pelegrina volcana Maddison, 1996 – Panama
- Pelegrina yucatecana Maddison, 1996 – Mexico
