= Metaphidippus pernix =

Scientific classification
- Kingdom: Animalia
- Phylum: Arthropoda
- Subphylum: Chelicerata
- Class: Arachnida
- Order: Araneae
- Infraorder: Araneomorphae
- Family: Salticidae
- Genus: Metaphidippus
- Species: M. pernix

Binomial name
- Metaphidippus pernix F.O. P-Cambridge, 1901

Synonyms
- Dendryphantes pernotus Petrunkevitch, 1911; Metaphidippus pernotus (Petrunkevitch, 1911) – erroneous

Species of spider

Metaphidippus pernix is a species of spider in the Salticidae (jumping spider) family found in Guatemala.

== Taxonomy ==
The species was first described in 1901, as Metaphidippus pernix, by F. O. Pickard-Cambridge. In 1911, Alexander Petrunkevitch decided to transfer the species to the genus Dendryphantes. However, Dendryphantes pernix already existed as the name for a different species (Dendryphantes pernix Peckham & Peckham, 1901, now Beata pernix). Accordingly, Petrunkevitch coined the replacement specific name pernotus. In 1971, Jerzy Prószyński returned the species to Metaphidippus under its original name Metaphidippus pernix. The species has also been wrongly called Metaphidippus pernotus (Petrunkevitch, 1911), as in earlier versions of the World Spider Catalog.
