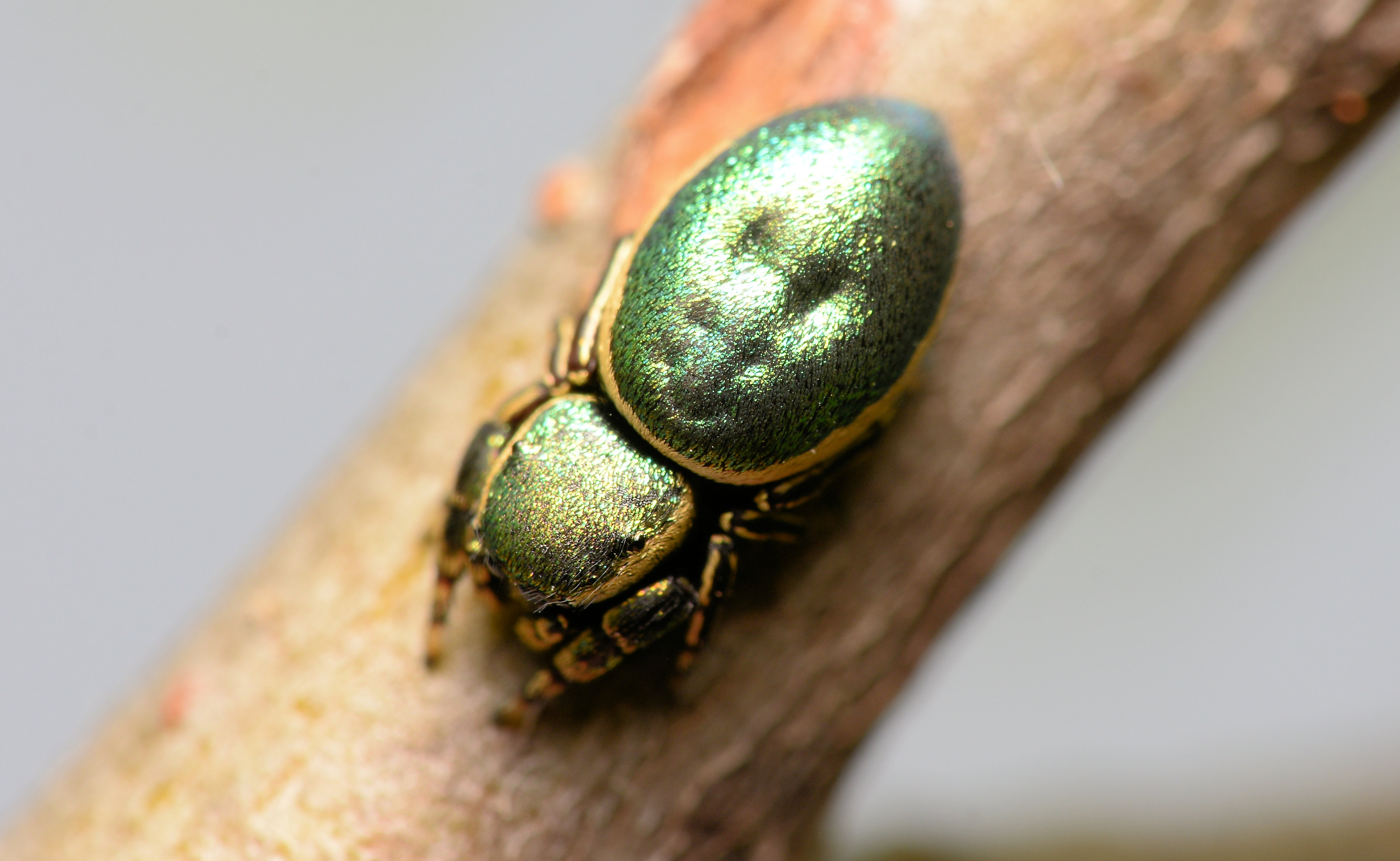
- Female Sassacus papenhoei

Scientific classification
- Kingdom: Animalia
- Phylum: Arthropoda
- Subphylum: Chelicerata
- Class: Arachnida
- Order: Araneae
- Infraorder: Araneomorphae
- Family: Salticidae
- Subfamily: Salticinae
- Genus: Sassacus; Peckham & Peckham, 1895

Type species
- S. papenhoei Peckham & Peckham, 1895

Species
- 21, see text

Synonyms
- Agassa Simon, 1901; Ramboia Mello-Leitão, 1943

= Sassacus (spider) =

Genus of spiders

Sassacus is a genus of jumping spiders that was first described by George and Elizabeth Peckham in 1895. It is likely named after Sassacus, a Native American chief of the 16th and 17th century.

== Species ==
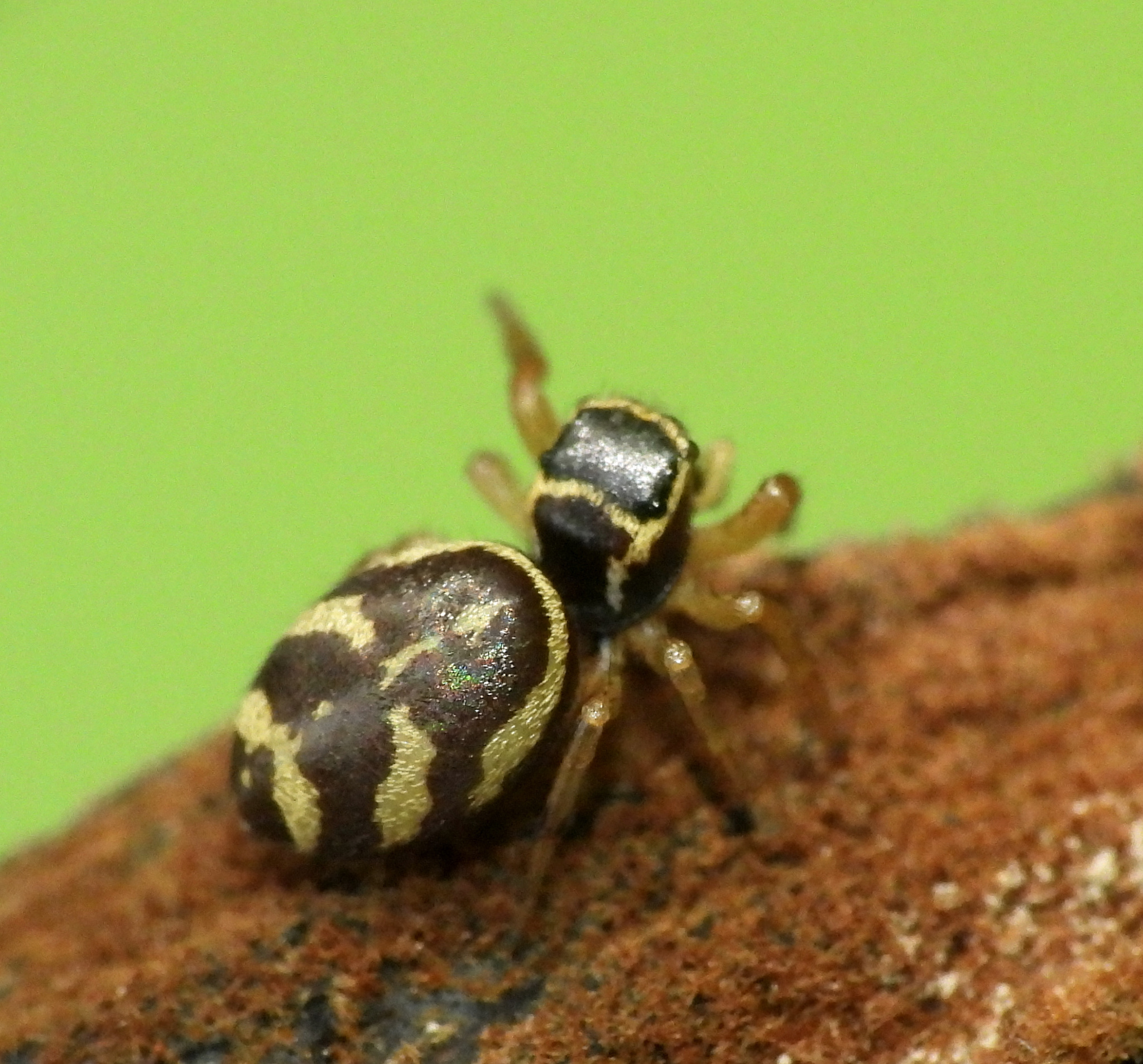
Female S. aurantiacus

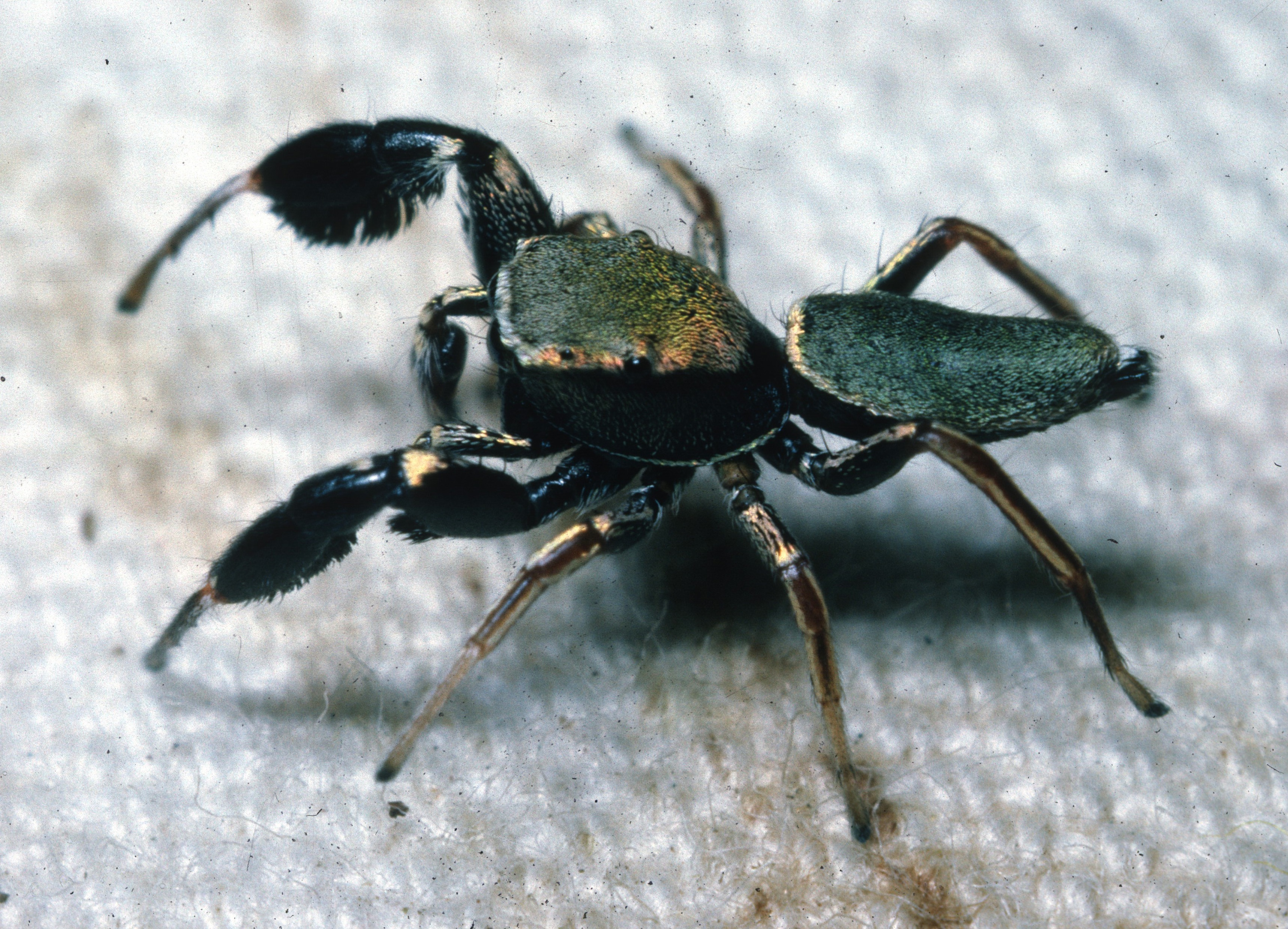
Male S. barbipes

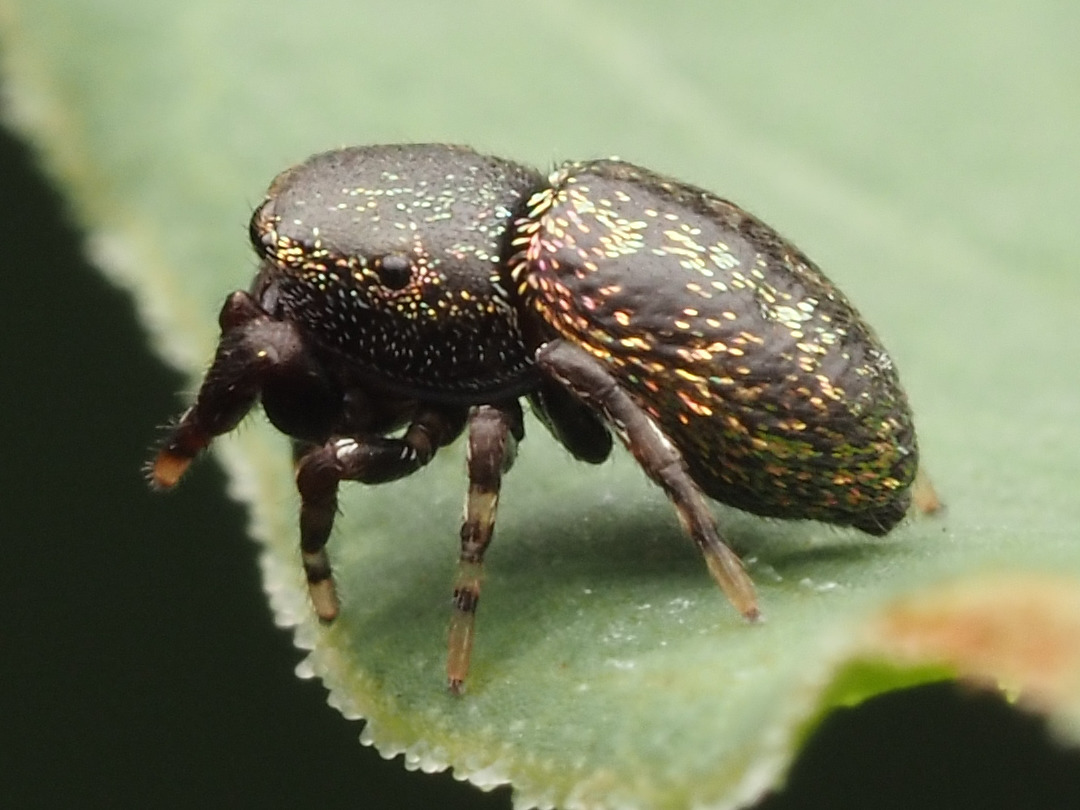
Female S. cyaneus

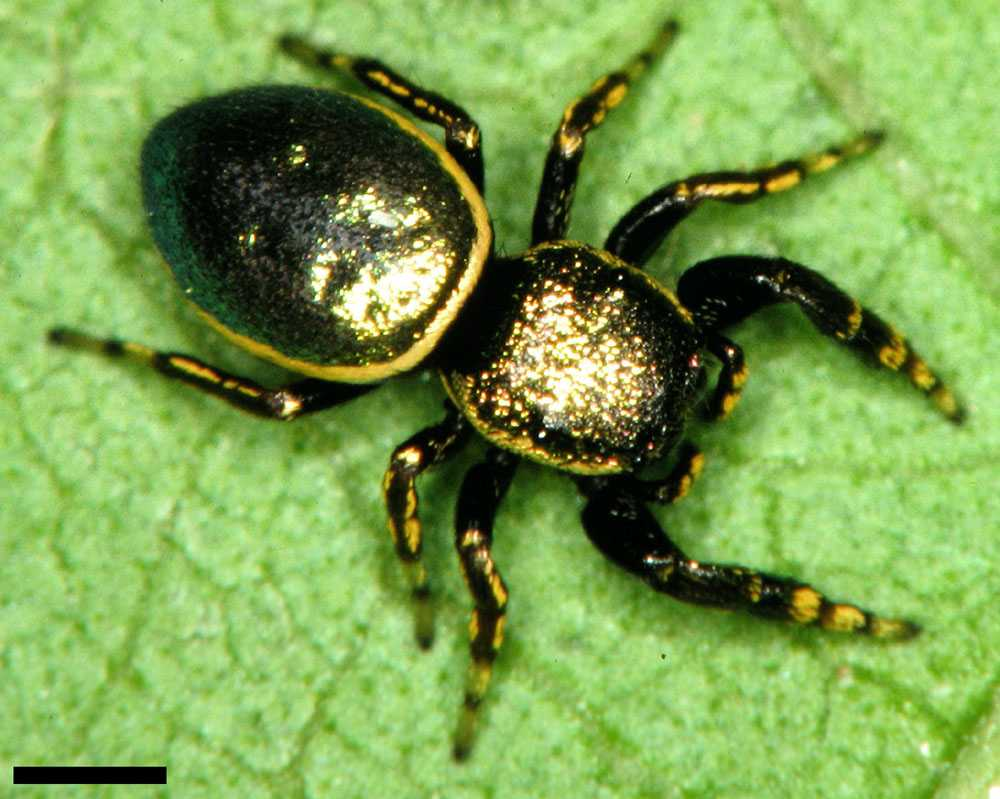
Female S. papenhoei

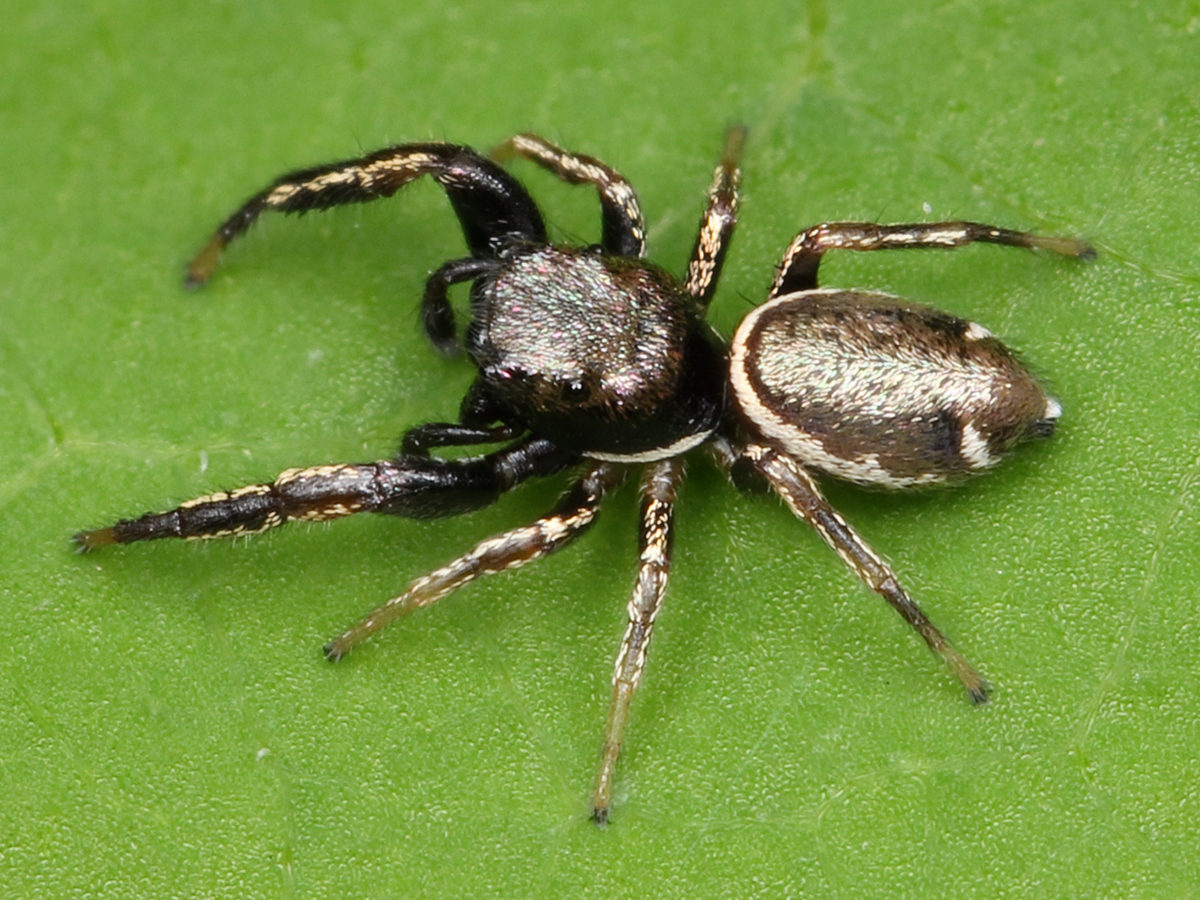
Male S. vitis

As of August 2019 it contains twenty-one species, found in North America, South America, Panama, and Costa Rica:

- Sassacus alboguttatus (F. O. Pickard-Cambridge, 1901) – Mexico
- Sassacus arcuatus Simon, 1901 – Brazil
- Sassacus aurantiacus Simon, 1901 – Brazil
- Sassacus aztecus Richman, 2008 – Mexico
- Sassacus barbipes (Peckham & Peckham, 1888) – Mexico to Costa Rica
- Sassacus biaccentuatus Simon, 1901 – Paraguay
- Sassacus cyaneus (Hentz, 1846) – USA
- Sassacus dissimilis Mello-Leitão, 1941 – Argentina
- Sassacus flavicinctus Crane, 1949 – Venezuela
- Sassacus glyphochelis Bauab, 1979 – Brazil
- Sassacus helenicus (Mello-Leitão, 1943) – Brazil
- Sassacus leucomystax (Caporiacco, 1947) – Guyana
- Sassacus lirios Richman, 2008 – Mexico to Costa Rica
- Sassacus ocellatus Crane, 1949 – Venezuela
- Sassacus paiutus (Gertsch, 1934) – USA, Mexico
- Sassacus papenhoei Peckham & Peckham, 1895 (type) – North America
- Sassacus resplendens Simon, 1901 – Venezuela
- Sassacus samalayucae Richman, 2008 – Mexico
- Sassacus sexspinosus (Caporiacco, 1955) – Venezuela
- Sassacus trochilus Simon, 1901 – Brazil
- Sassacus vitis (Cockerell, 1894) – Canada to Panama
