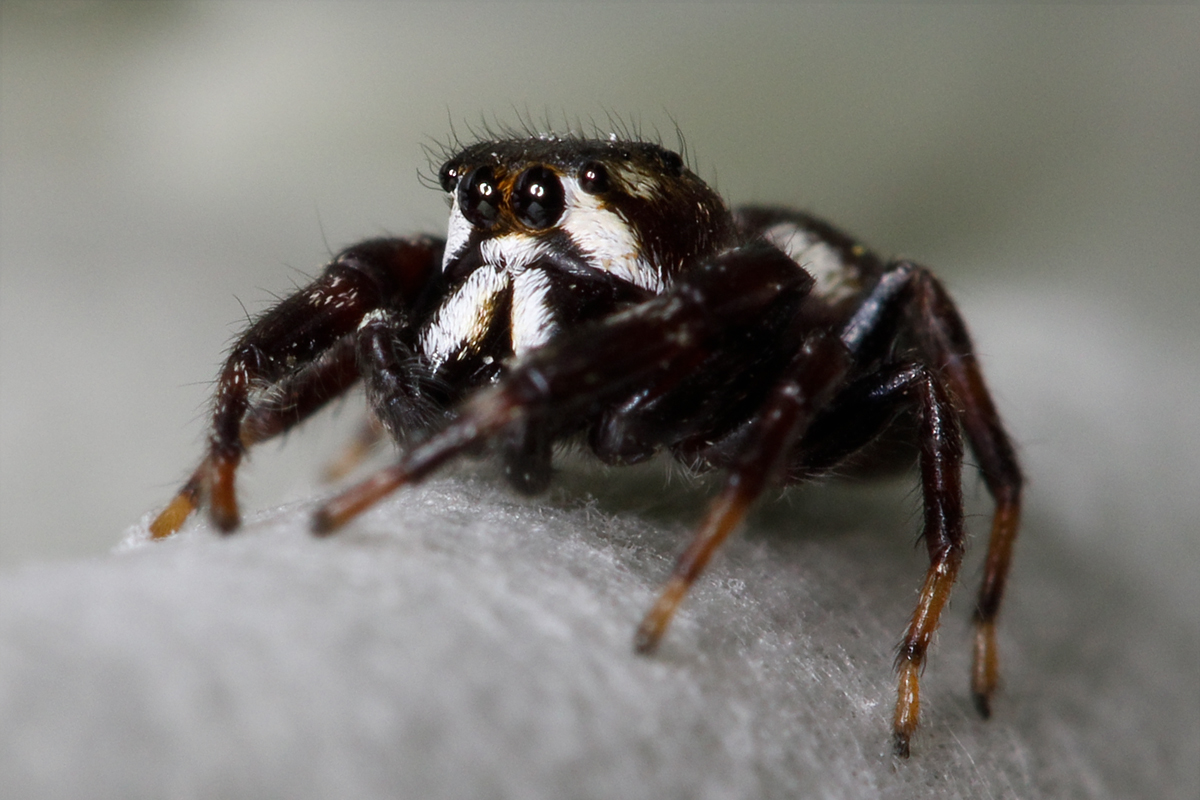
- Male

Scientific classification
- Kingdom: Animalia
- Phylum: Arthropoda
- Subphylum: Chelicerata
- Class: Arachnida
- Order: Araneae
- Infraorder: Araneomorphae
- Family: Salticidae
- Genus: Metaphidippus
- Species: M. manni

Binomial name
- Metaphidippus manni (Peckham & Peckham, 1901)

= Metaphidippus manni =

Species of spider

Metaphidippus manni is a species of jumping spider (family Salticidae) found in North America.
