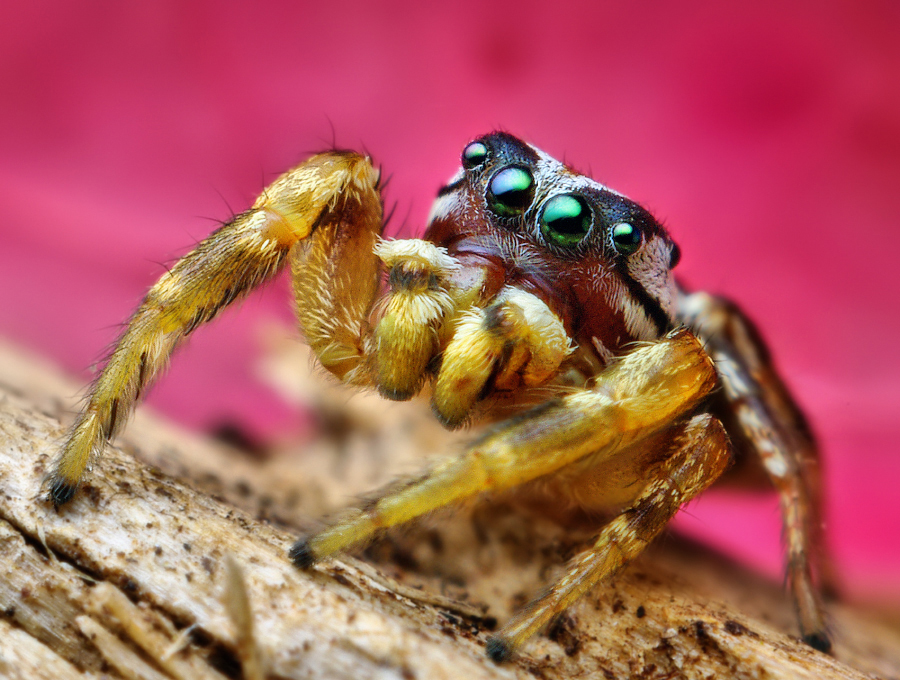

Scientific classification
- Kingdom: Animalia
- Phylum: Arthropoda
- Subphylum: Chelicerata
- Class: Arachnida
- Order: Araneae
- Infraorder: Araneomorphae
- Family: Salticidae
- Genus: Pelegrina
- Species: P. pervaga

Binomial name
- Pelegrina pervaga (Peckham & Peckham, 1909)

= Pelegrina pervaga =

Species of spider

Pelegrina pervaga is a species of jumping spider in the family Salticidae. It is found in the United States.
