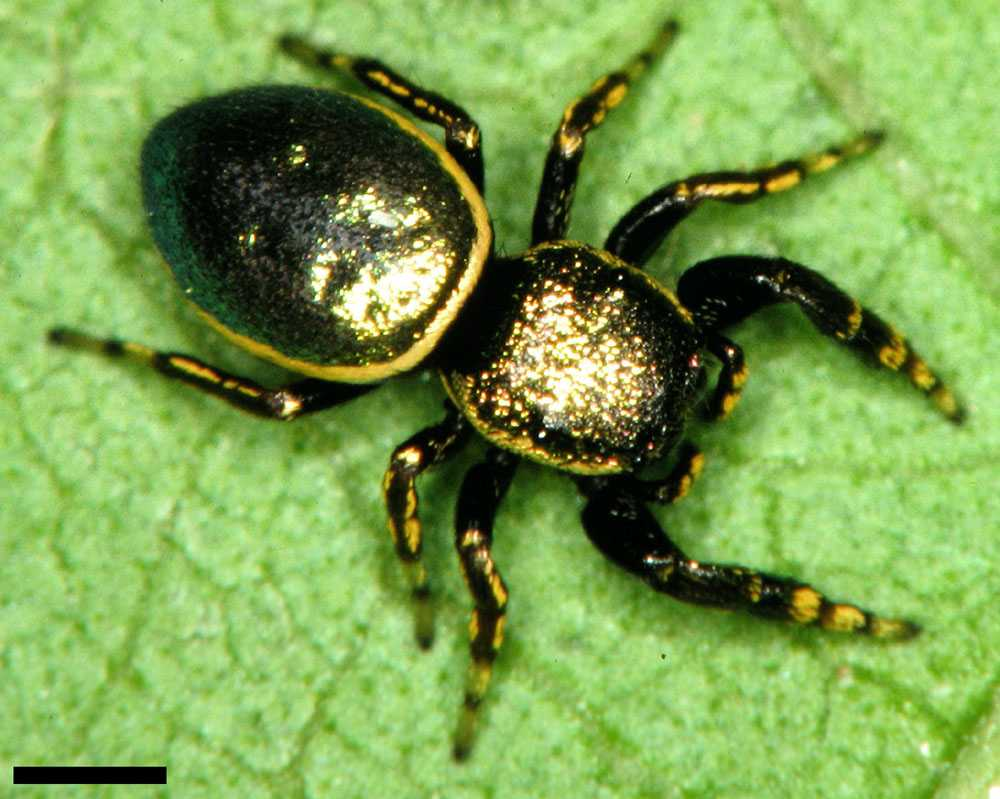
- Female
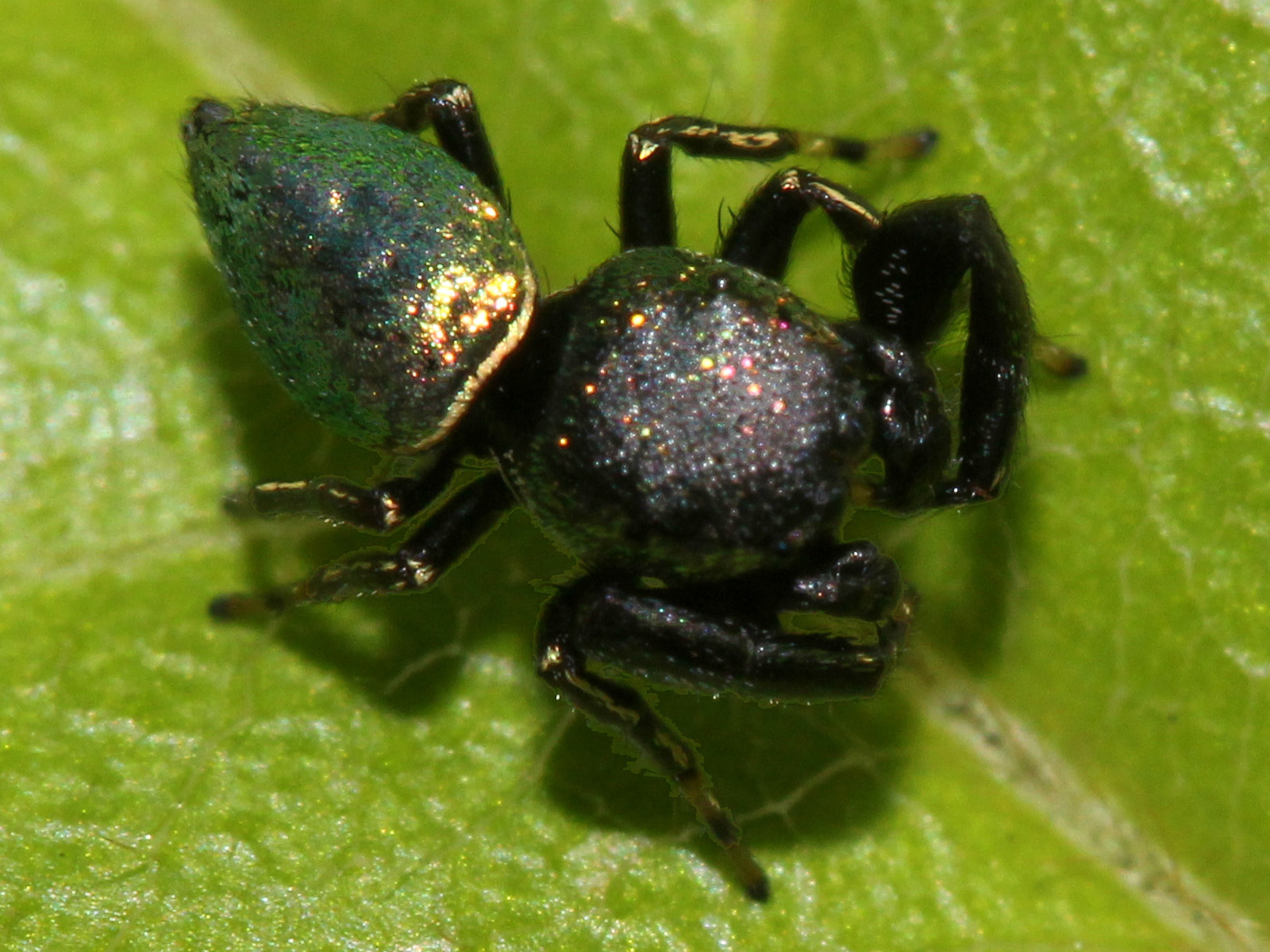
- Male

Scientific classification
- Kingdom: Animalia
- Phylum: Arthropoda
- Subphylum: Chelicerata
- Class: Arachnida
- Order: Araneae
- Infraorder: Araneomorphae
- Family: Salticidae
- Genus: Sassacus
- Species: S. papenhoei

Binomial name
- Sassacus papenhoei Peckham & Peckham, 1895

= Sassacus papenhoei =

Species of spider

Sassacus papenhoei is a species of jumping spider in the family Salticidae. It is found in North America.
