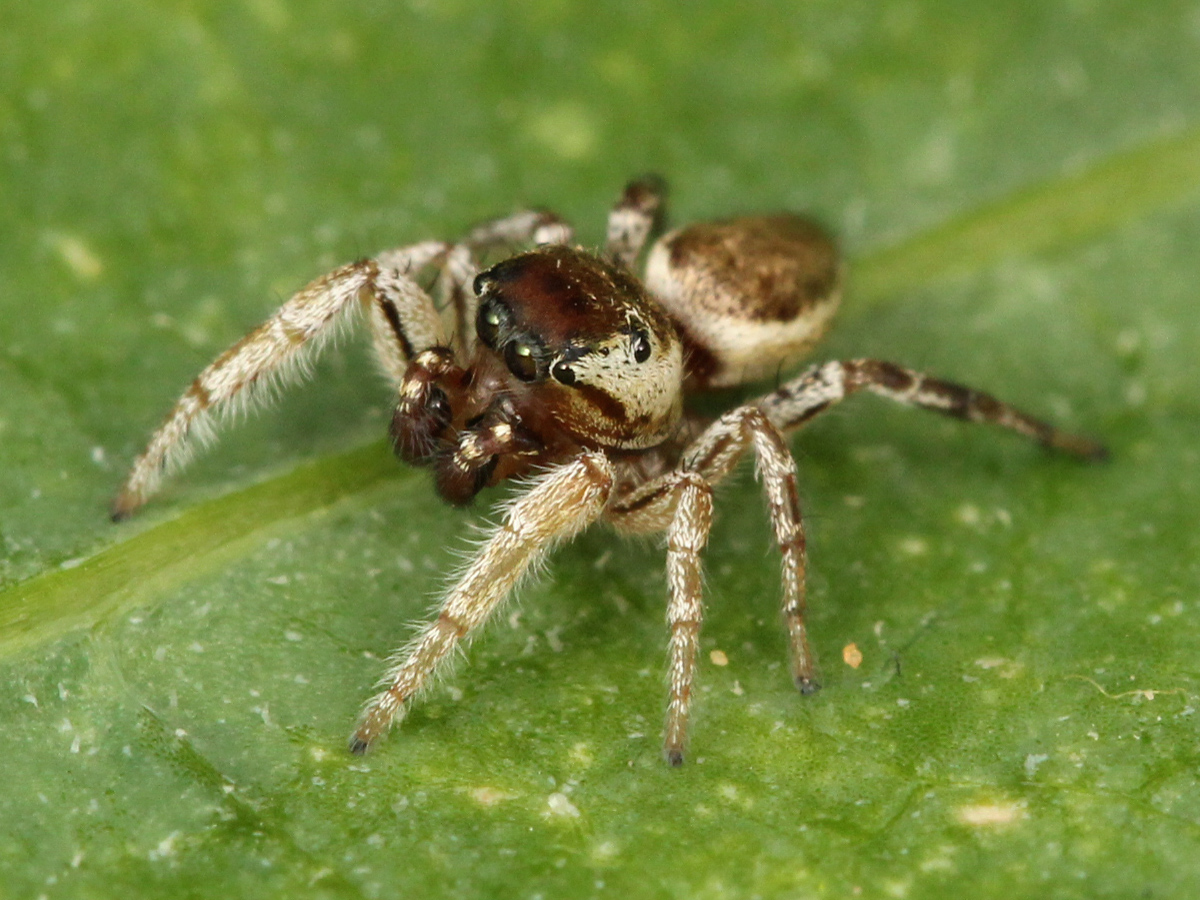
- Male

Scientific classification
- Kingdom: Animalia
- Phylum: Arthropoda
- Subphylum: Chelicerata
- Class: Arachnida
- Order: Araneae
- Infraorder: Araneomorphae
- Family: Salticidae
- Genus: Pelegrina
- Species: P. flaviceps

Binomial name
- Pelegrina flaviceps (Kaston, 1973)

= Pelegrina flaviceps =

Species of spider

Pelegrina flaviceps is a species of jumping spider in the family Salticidae. It is found in the northeastern United States and southeastern Canada.
