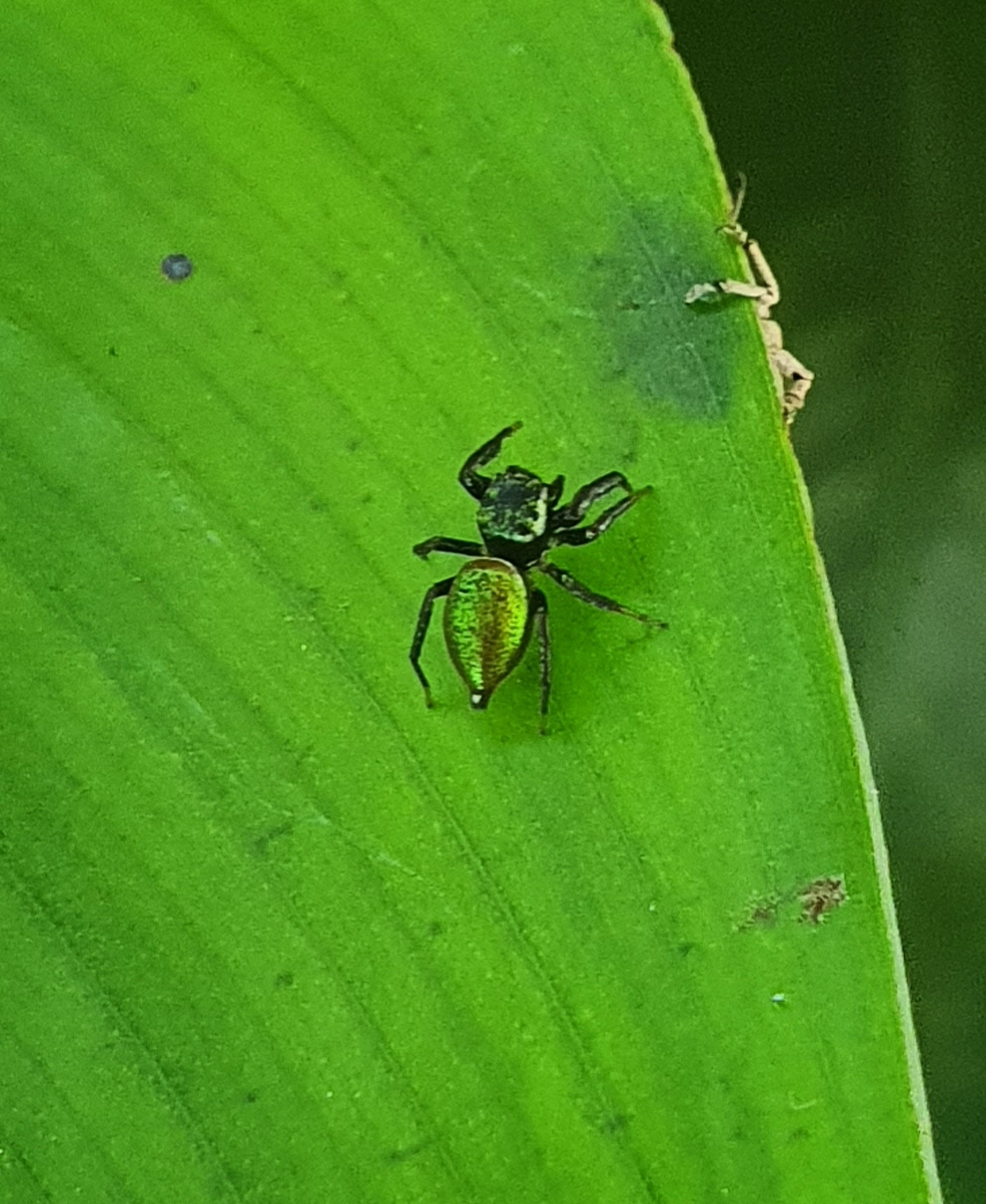
- female from Mexico
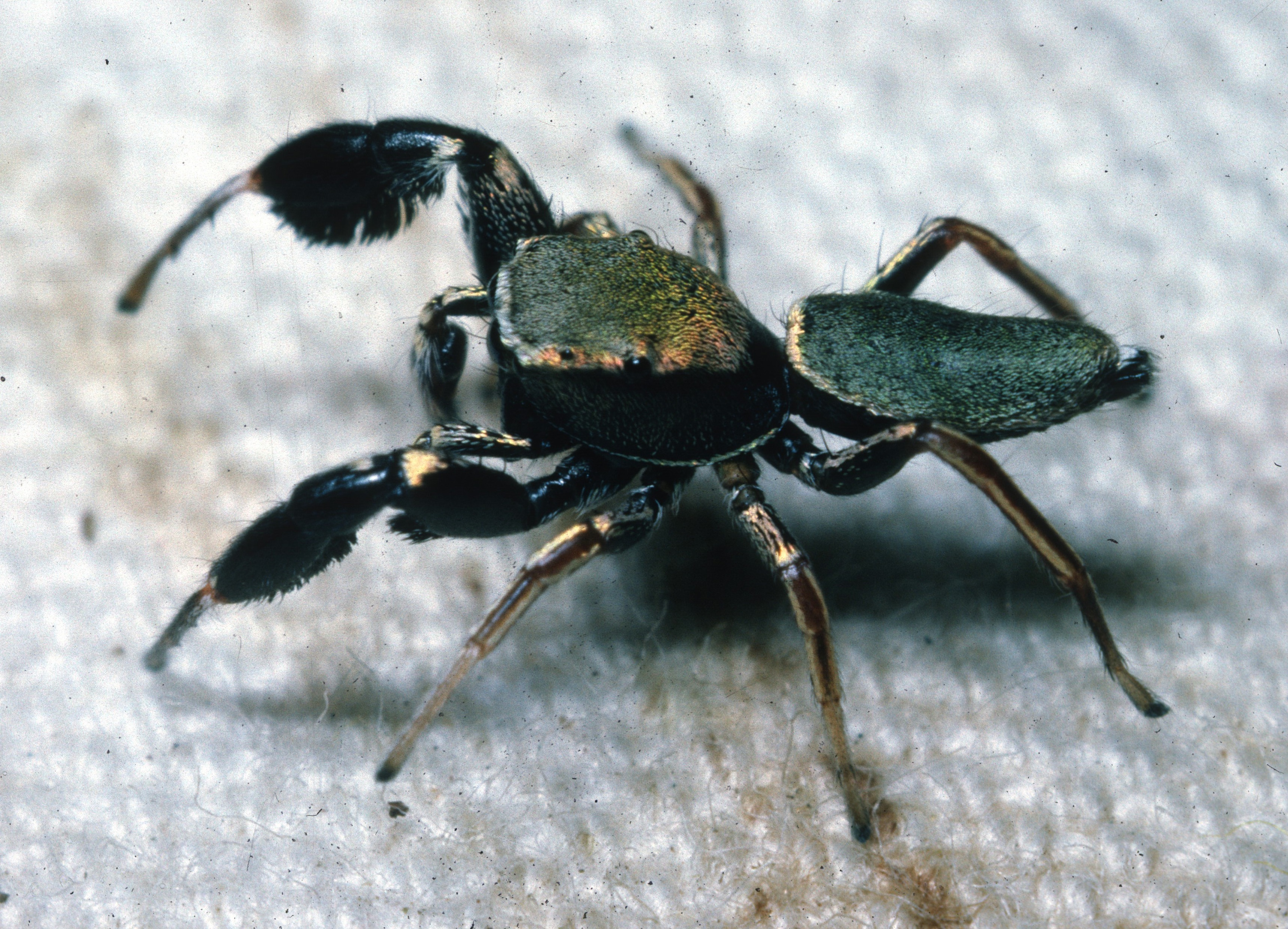
- male from Mexico

Scientific classification
- Kingdom: Animalia
- Phylum: Arthropoda
- Subphylum: Chelicerata
- Class: Arachnida
- Order: Araneae
- Infraorder: Araneomorphae
- Family: Salticidae
- Genus: Sassacus
- Species: S. barbipes

Binomial name
- Sassacus barbipes (G. W. Peckham & E. G. Peckham, 1888)

Synonyms
- Eris barbipes G. W. Peckham & E. G. Peckham, 1888; Ashtabula nigricans F. O. Pickard-Cambridge, 1901

= Sassacus barbipes =

Species of jumping spider

Sassacus barbipes is a species of jumping spider in the family Salticidae. It is found from Mexico to Costa Rica.

== Taxonomy ==
The species was originally described as Eris barbipes by George and Elizabeth Peckham in 1888. F. O. Pickard-Cambridge later described Ashtabula nigricans in 1901, which was subsequently recognized as a synonym. The species was transferred to the genus Sassacus by the Peckhams in 1909.

== Distribution ==
Sassacus barbipes has been recorded from Mexico to Costa Rica. In Mexico, it occurs from southern Sonora through central regions, with records from multiple states including Colima, Guanajuato, Guerrero, Jalisco, Mexico, Morelos, Nayarit, Nuevo León, Oaxaca, and Sonora. The species has also been reported from Guatemala.

A specimen found in the United States in 1909 may have been misidentified.

== Description ==
Sassacus barbipes is distinguished from other North American Sassacus species by its flattened front tibiae and patellae, which bear a heavy brush of spatulate hairs in both sexes.

== Females ==
Females have a leg formula of 4123 and range from 6.8 to 8.5 mm in total length. The cephalothorax measures 2.2-2.6 mm in length and 1.7-1.9 mm in width. The chelicerae possess one or two promarginal teeth and one large retromarginal tooth.

The overall coloration is red to yellow-brown. The carapace is dark reddish-brown with scattered metallic scales that appear metallic pink under alcohol preservation. The clypeus, pedipalps, and chelicerae are reddish-brown, while the sternum, endites, and labium are orange-brown with lighter anterior portions.

The legs are yellow-brown, with the front legs showing darker brown coloration on the femora, patellae, and tibiae. The flattened tibiae of the front legs feature a ventral fringe of yellowish spatulate hairs.

The opisthosoma is yellowish with scattered metallic scales and displays a whitish basal band that separates the lighter dorsal surface from the darker ventral surface.

== Males ==
Males are smaller than females, with a total length ranging from 4.5 to 5.5 mm and a leg formula of 1423. They have proportionally longer front legs and smaller abdomens compared to females.

== Natural history ==
Males of S. barbipes have been collected during June and August, while females have been found from June through August, suggesting a summer activity period.
