= Metaphidippus chera =

Scientific classification
- Kingdom: Animalia
- Phylum: Arthropoda
- Subphylum: Chelicerata
- Class: Arachnida
- Order: Araneae
- Infraorder: Araneomorphae
- Family: Salticidae
- Genus: Metaphidippus
- Species: M. chera

Binomial name
- Metaphidippus chera (Chamberlin, 1924)

Species of spider

Metaphidippus chera is a species of jumping spider in the family Salticidae. It is found in the United States and Mexico.
