= Streptomyces cyaneus =

Scientific classification
- Domain: Bacteria
- Kingdom: Bacillati
- Phylum: Actinomycetota
- Class: Actinomycetia
- Order: Streptomycetales
- Family: Streptomycetaceae
- Genus: Streptomyces
- Species: S. cyaneus

Binomial name
- Streptomyces cyaneus (Krasil'nikov 1941) Waksman 1953 (Approved Lists 1980)

Type strain
- AS 4.1671; ATCC 14923; BCRC 13767; CBS 647.72; CCRC 13767; DSM 40108; IFO 13346; JCM 4220; JCM 4743; KCTC 9719; NBRC 13346; NRRL B-16305; NRRL B-2296; NRRL-ISP 5108; PCM 2297; RIA 1307; VKM Ac-1712

Species of bacterium

Streptomyces cyaneus is an actinobacterium species in the genus Streptomyces.

S. cyaneus produces the alkylresorcinol adipostatin A (cardol). It also produces a chitinase A able to produce protoplasts from Schizophyllum commune cultured mycelia.
