= Metaphidippus mandibulatus =

Scientific classification
- Kingdom: Animalia
- Phylum: Arthropoda
- Subphylum: Chelicerata
- Class: Arachnida
- Order: Araneae
- Infraorder: Araneomorphae
- Family: Salticidae
- Genus: Metaphidippus
- Species: M. mandibulatus

Binomial name
- Metaphidippus mandibulatus F. O. P.-Cambridge, 1901

Species of spider

Metaphidippus mandibulatus is a species of spider in the family Salticidae (jumping spiders) from Costa Rica. It is the type species of Metaphidippus. The species name was first published in 1901 by Frederick Octavius Pickard-Cambridge.
