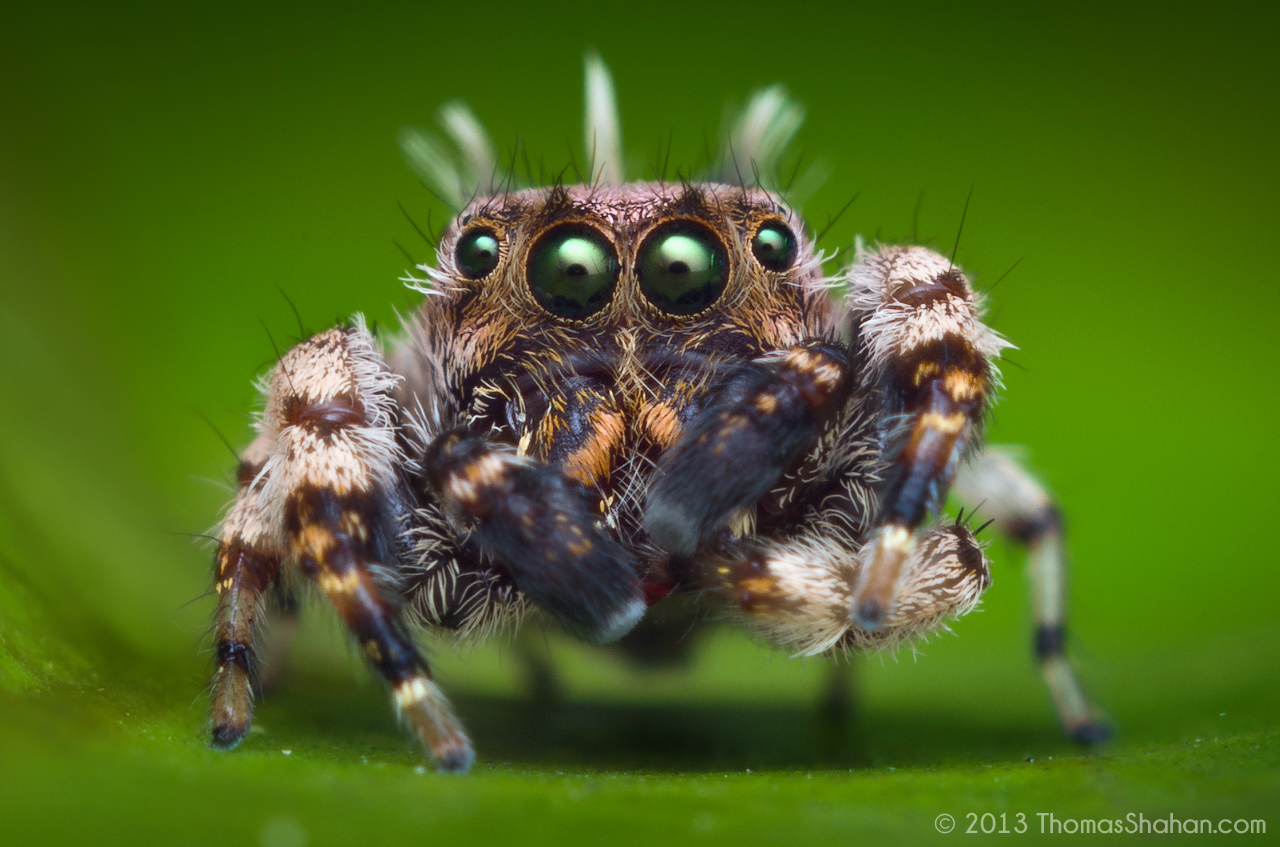
- Adult male Beata

Scientific classification
- Kingdom: Animalia
- Phylum: Arthropoda
- Subphylum: Chelicerata
- Class: Arachnida
- Order: Araneae
- Infraorder: Araneomorphae
- Family: Salticidae
- Subfamily: Salticinae
- Genus: Beata; Peckham & Peckham, 1895

Type species
- B. magna Peckham & Peckham, 1895

Species
- 21, see text

Synonyms
- Dryphias Simon, 1901

= Beata (spider) =

Genus of spiders

Beata is a genus of jumping spiders that was first described by George Peckham & Elizabeth Peckham in 1895.

== Species ==
As of June 2019 it contains twenty-one species, found in Central America, North America, the Caribbean, Colombia, Paraguay, Argentina, Guyana, and Brazil:

- Beata aenea (Mello-Leitão, 1945) – Brazil, Argentina
- Beata blauveltae Caporiacco, 1947 – Guyana
- Beata cephalica F. O. Pickard-Cambridge, 1901 – Panama
- Beata cinereonitida Simon, 1902 – Brazil
- Beata fausta (Peckham & Peckham, 1901) – Brazil
- Beata germaini Simon, 1902 – Brazil, Paraguay
- Beata hispida (Peckham & Peckham, 1901) – Mexico
- Beata inconcinna (Peckham & Peckham, 1895) – Trinidad
- Beata jubata (C. L. Koch, 1846) – St. Thomas
- Beata longipes (F. O. Pickard-Cambridge, 1901) – Panama
- Beata lucida (Galiano, 1992) – Argentina
- Beata maccuni (Peckham & Peckham, 1895) – Panama to Brazil
- Beata magna Peckham & Peckham, 1895 (type) – Guatemala to Colombia
- Beata munda Chickering, 1946 – Panama
- Beata octopunctata (Peckham & Peckham, 1894) – St. Vincent
- Beata pernix (Peckham & Peckham, 1901) – Brazil
- Beata rustica (Peckham & Peckham, 1895) – Guatemala to Brazil
- Beata striata Petrunkevitch, 1925 – Panama
- Beata venusta Chickering, 1946 – Panama
- Beata wickhami (Peckham & Peckham, 1894) – USA, Bahama Is., Cuba
- Beata zeteki Chickering, 1946 – Panama
