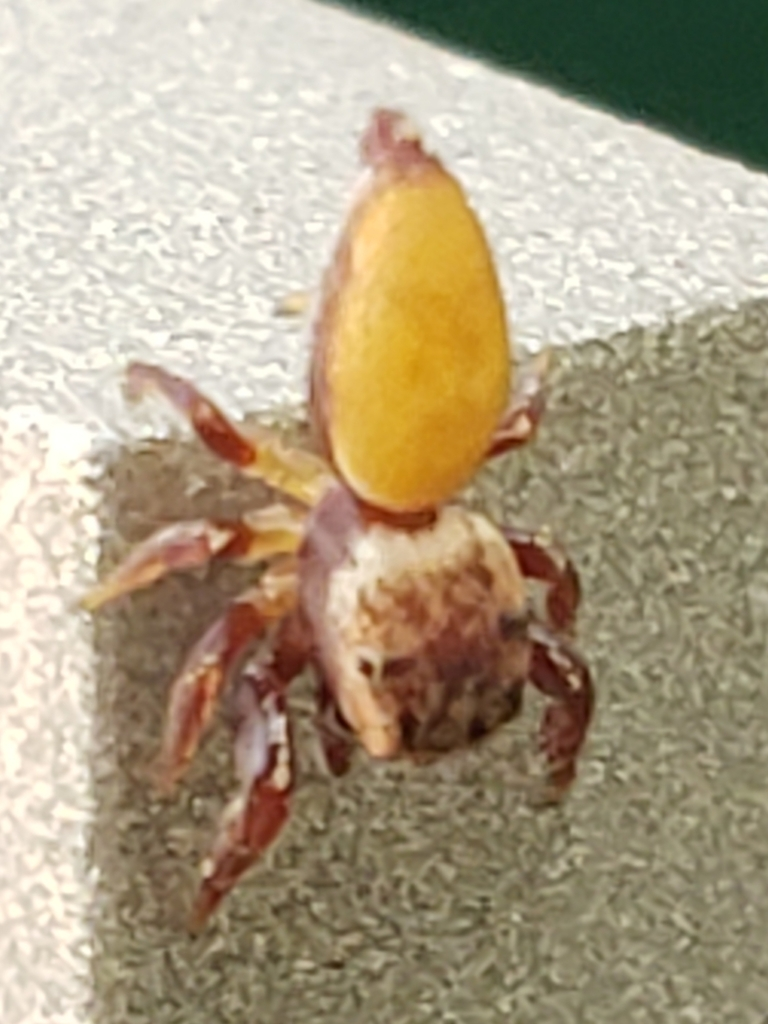

Scientific classification
- Kingdom: Animalia
- Phylum: Arthropoda
- Subphylum: Chelicerata
- Class: Arachnida
- Order: Araneae
- Infraorder: Araneomorphae
- Family: Salticidae
- Genus: Beata
- Species: B. wickhami

Binomial name
- Beata wickhami (Peckham & Peckham, 1894)

= Beata wickhami =

Species of spider

Beata wickhami is a species of jumping spider in the family Salticidae. It is found in the United States, Bahama Islands, and Cuba.
