= Chitinase A N-terminal domain =

ChitinaseA_N
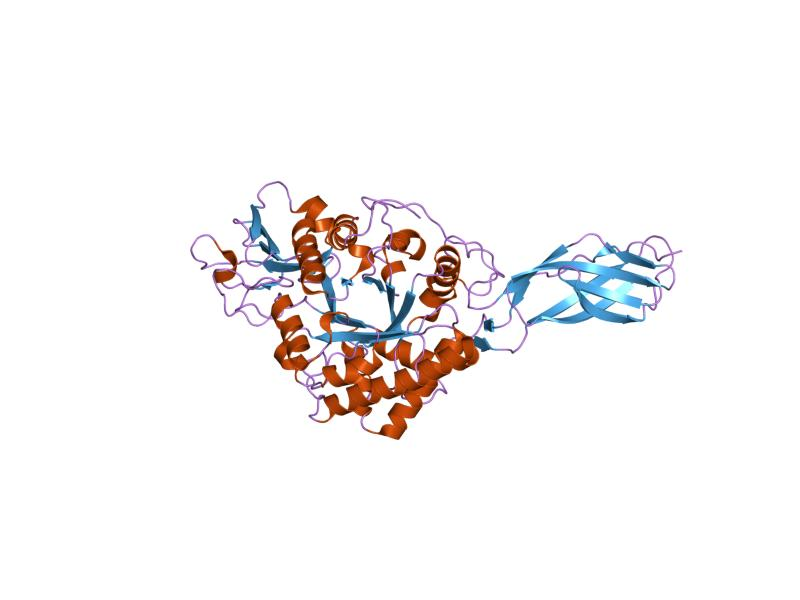
- crystal structure of chitinase a from s. marcescens at 1.55 angstroms

Identifiers
- Symbol: ChitinaseA_N
- Pfam: PF08329
- Pfam clan: CL0159
- InterPro: IPR013540
- SCOP2: 1ctn / SCOPe / SUPFAM
- CDD: cd02848
Available protein structures:
- Pfam: structures / ECOD
- PDB: RCSB PDB; PDBe; PDBj
- PDBsum: structure summary

In molecular biology, the chitinase A N-terminal domain is found at the N-terminus of a number of bacterial chitinases and similar viral proteins. It is organised into a fibronectin III module domain-like fold, comprising only beta strands. Its function is not known, but it may be involved in interaction with the enzyme substrate, chitin. It is separated by a hinge region from the catalytic domain; this hinge region is probably mobile, allowing the N-terminal domain to have different relative positions in solution.
