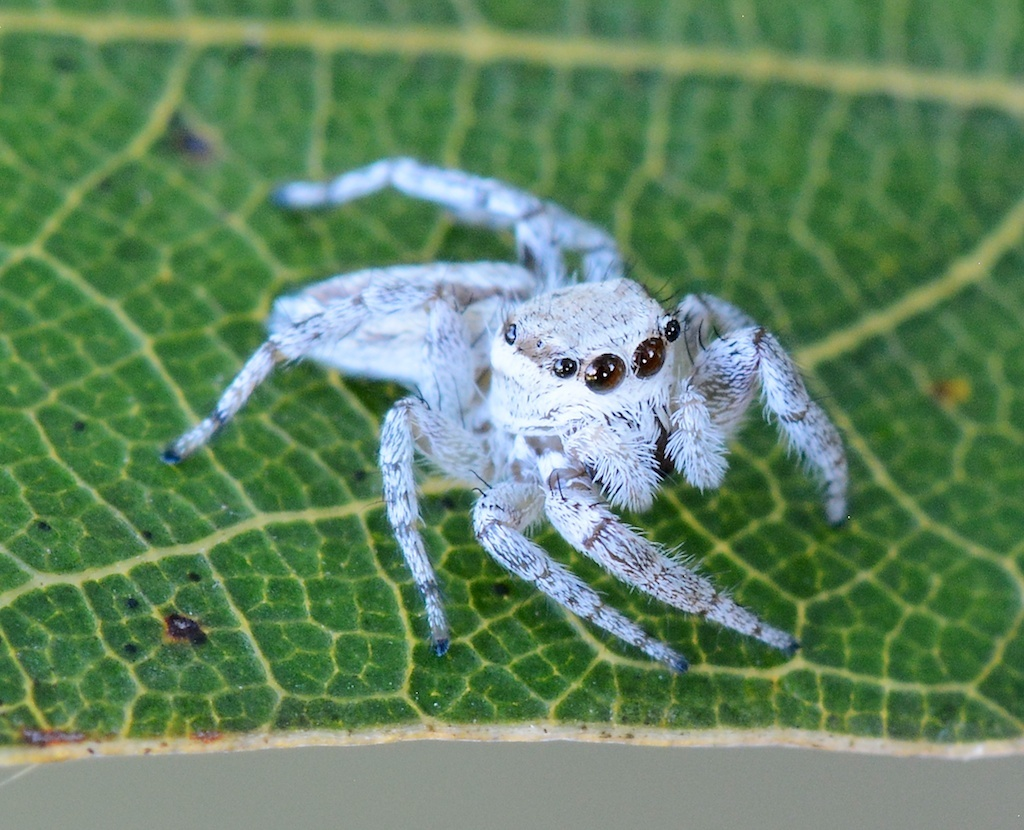

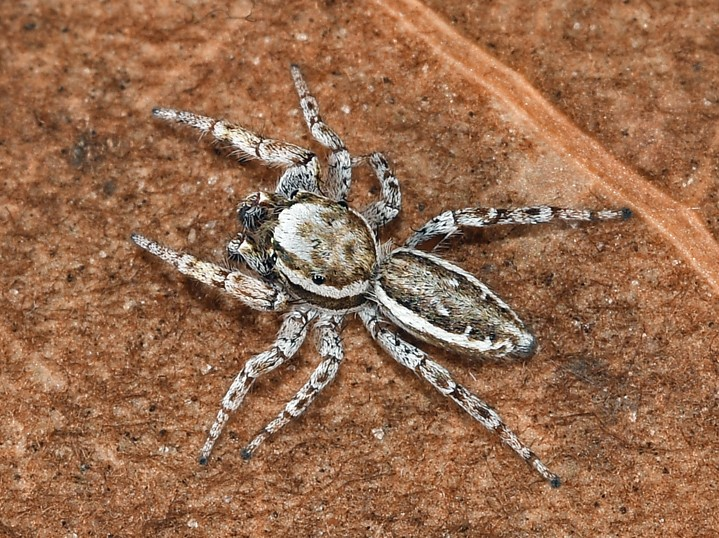
- Female (top) and male (bottom)

Scientific classification
- Kingdom: Animalia
- Phylum: Arthropoda
- Subphylum: Chelicerata
- Class: Arachnida
- Order: Araneae
- Infraorder: Araneomorphae
- Family: Salticidae
- Genus: Pelegrina
- Species: P. tillandsiae

Binomial name
- Pelegrina tillandsiae (Kaston, 1973)

= Pelegrina tillandsiae =

Species of spider

Pelegrina tillandsiae is a species of jumping spider in the family Salticidae. It is found in the United States.
