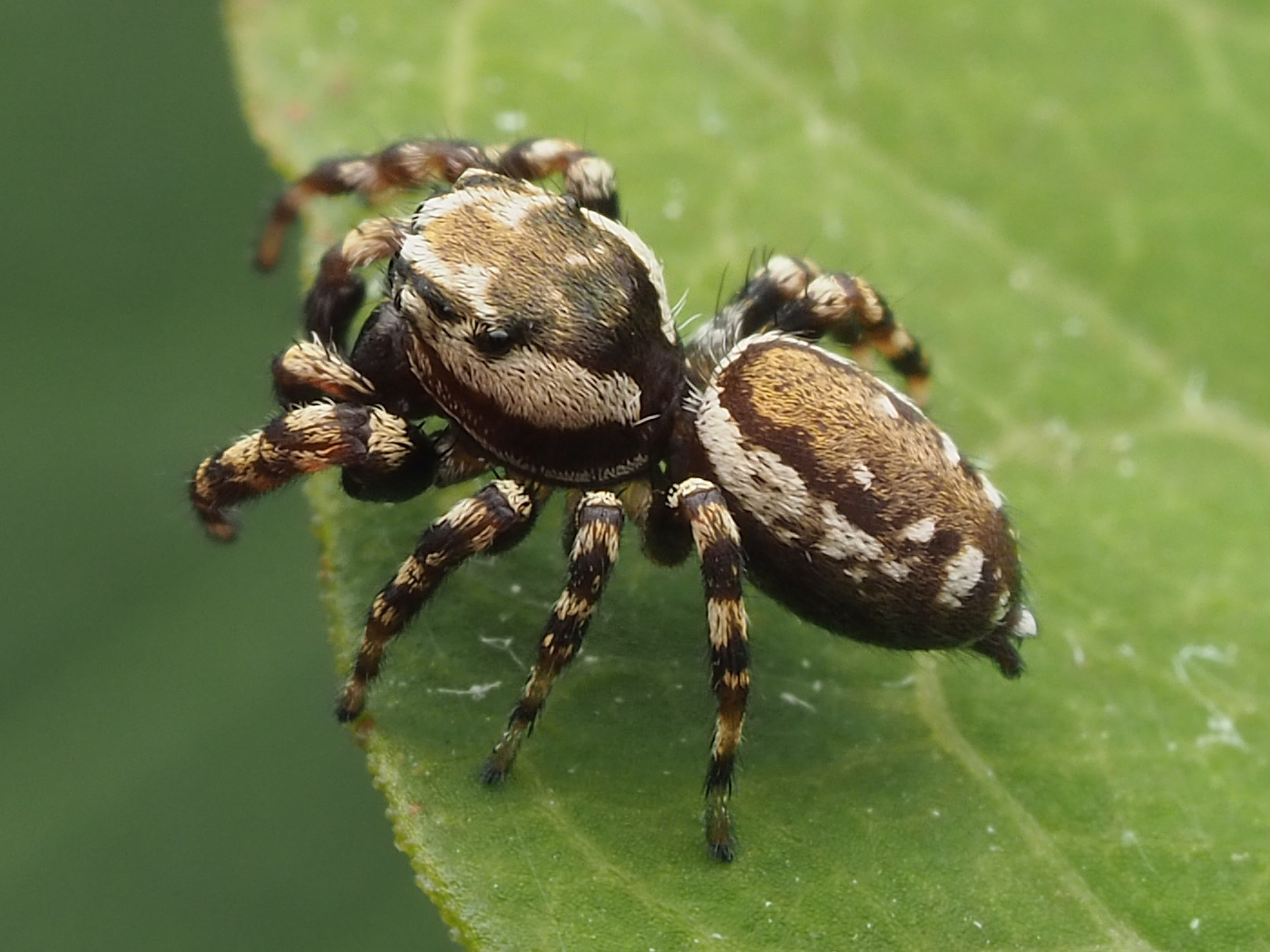
- Male
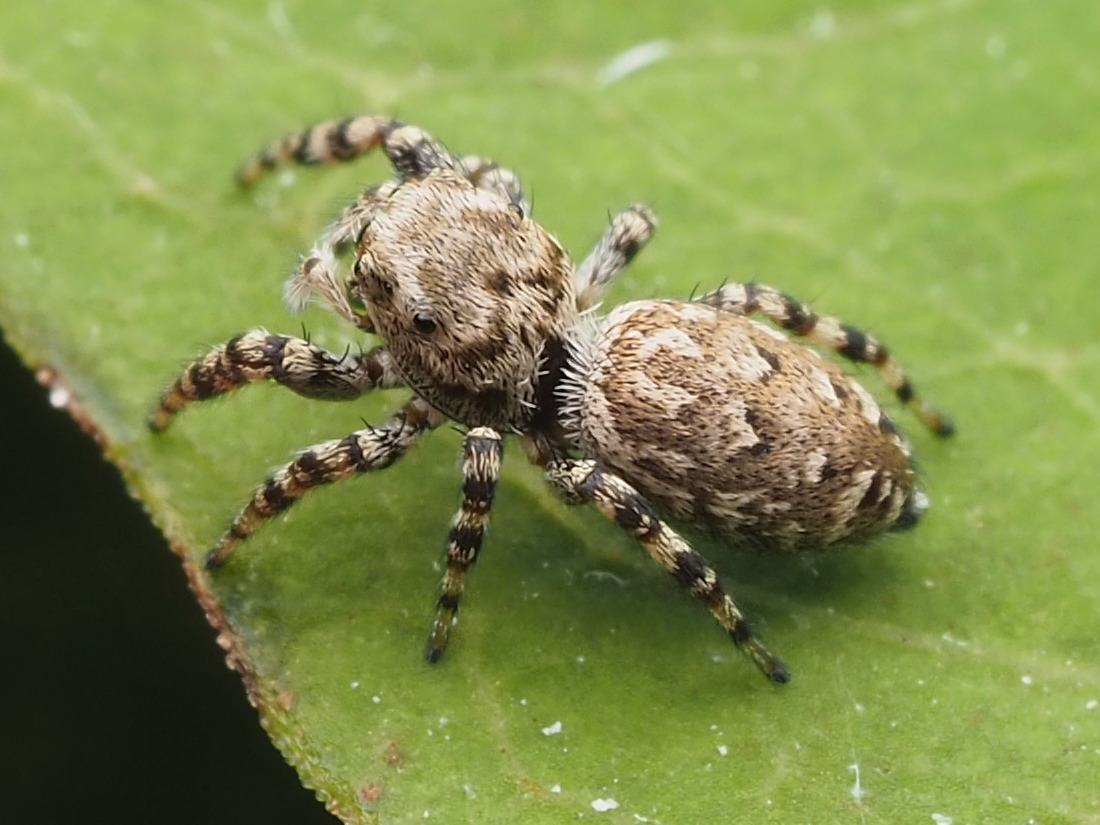
- Female

Scientific classification
- Kingdom: Animalia
- Phylum: Arthropoda
- Subphylum: Chelicerata
- Class: Arachnida
- Order: Araneae
- Infraorder: Araneomorphae
- Family: Salticidae
- Genus: Pelegrina
- Species: P. galathea

Binomial name
- Pelegrina galathea (Walckenaer, 1837)

Synonyms
- Attus galathea Walckenaer, 1826; nom. nud.; Attus galathea Walckenaer, 1837; Attus nubilus Hentz, 1846; Attus parvus Hentz, 1846; Euophrys leucophaea C.L. Koch, 1846; Frigga leucophaea (C.L. Koch, 1846); Icius crassiventer Keyserling, 1885; Dendryphantes ornatus Banks, 1892; Zygoballus parvus (Hentz, 1846); Metaphidippus digitatus F.O. P-Cambridge, 1901; Metaphidippus nubilus (Hentz, 1846); Dendryphantes nubilus (Hentz, 1846); Beata digitata (F.O. P-Cambridge, 1901); Dendryphantes digitatus (F.O. P-Cambridge, 1901); Metaphidippus galathea (Walckenaer, 1826); Phidippus galathea (Walckenaer, 1826)

= Pelegrina galathea =

Species of spider

Pelegrina galathea, commonly known as the peppered jumper, is a species of jumping spider (family Salticidae). It is endemic to North America, occurring from Canada to Costa Rica. It is normally found in sunlit, grassy areas.
