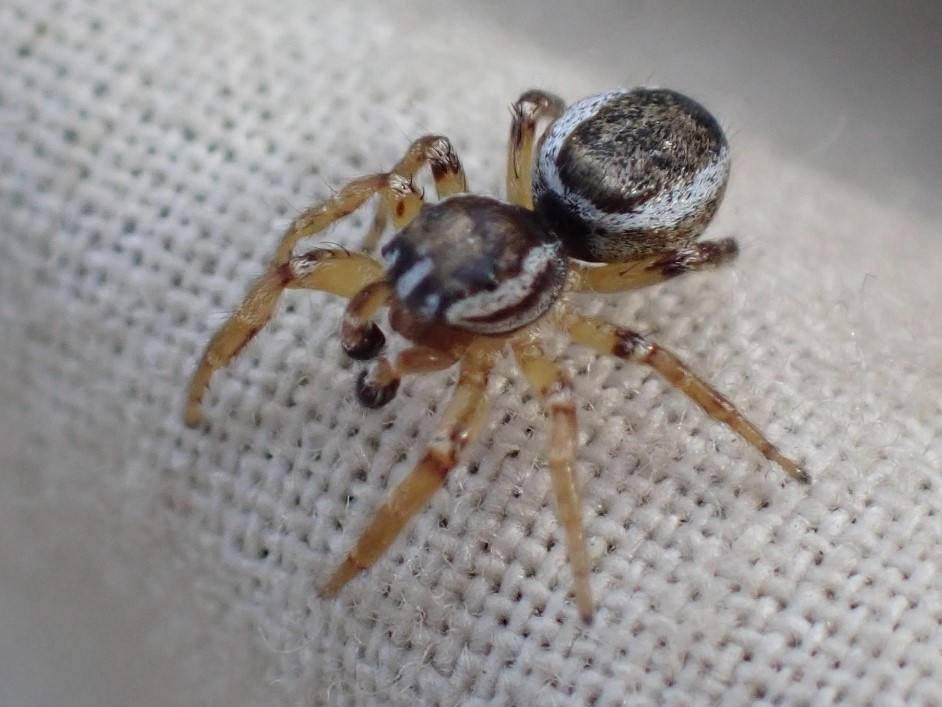

Scientific classification
- Kingdom: Animalia
- Phylum: Arthropoda
- Subphylum: Chelicerata
- Class: Arachnida
- Order: Araneae
- Infraorder: Araneomorphae
- Family: Salticidae
- Genus: Pelegrina
- Species: P. flavipes

Binomial name
- Pelegrina flavipes (Peckham & Peckham, 1888)

= Pelegrina flavipes =

Species of spider

Pelegrina flavipes, commonly called the striped white-cheeked jumping spider or yellowleg jumping spider, is a species of jumping spider in the family Salticidae. It is found in the United States and Canada where it lives on conifers such as spruce, pines, and junipers.

Its size varies from 3-5mm.
