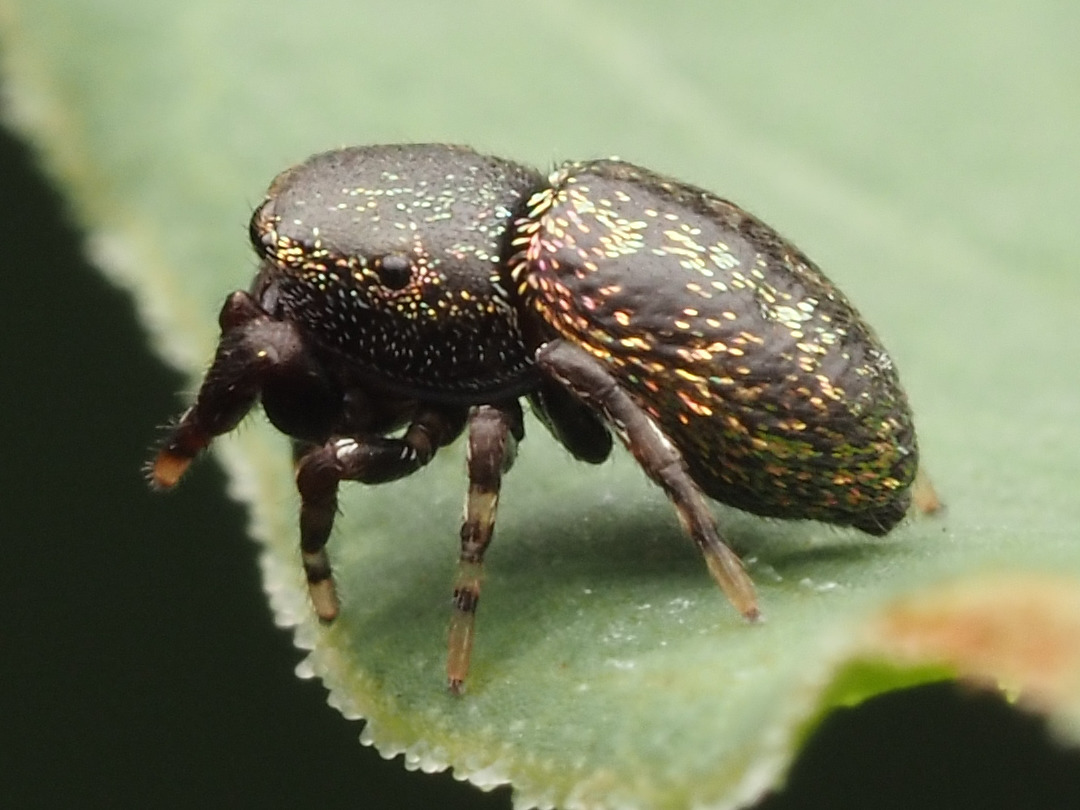
- Female
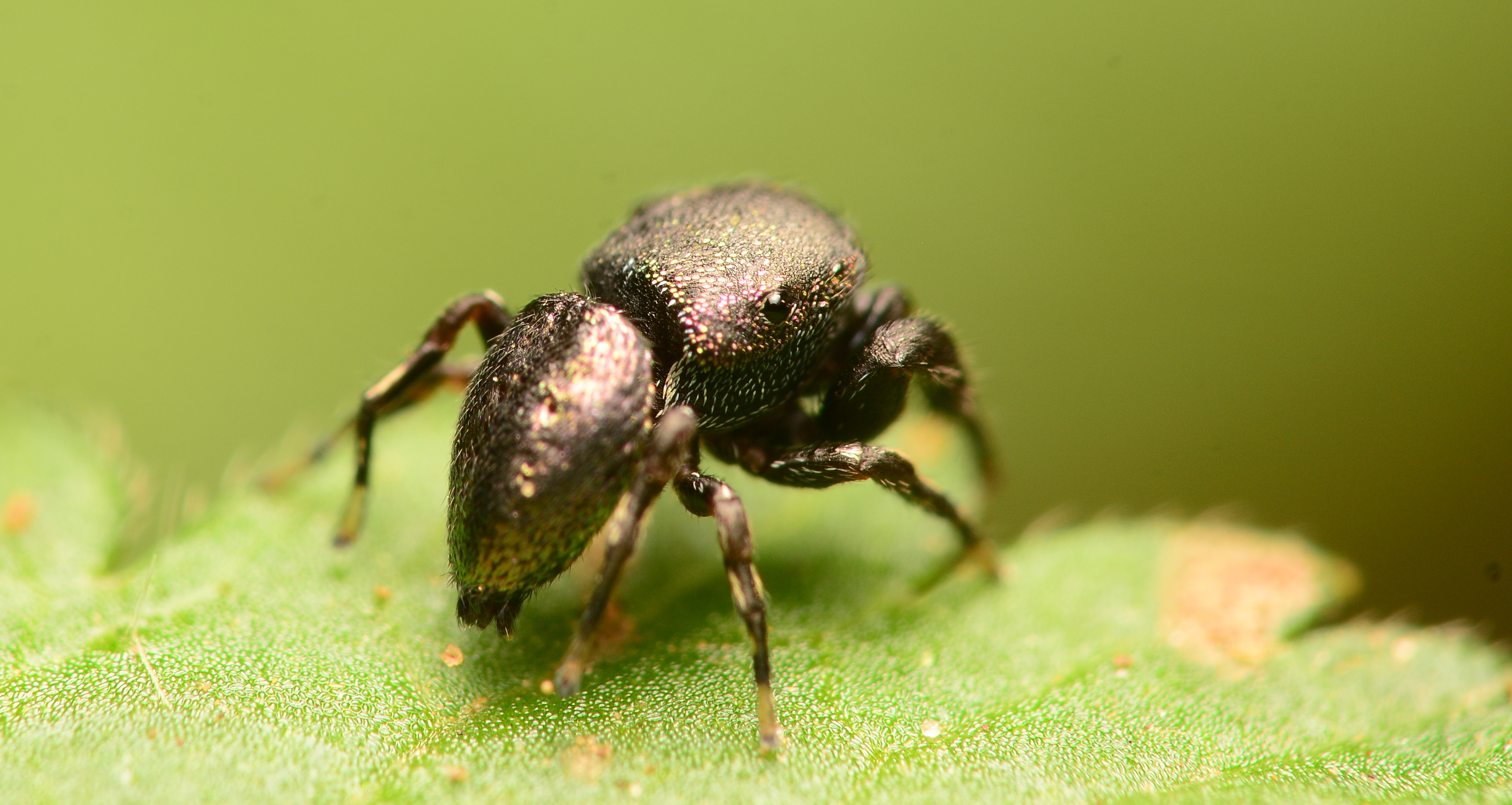
- Male

Scientific classification
- Kingdom: Animalia
- Phylum: Arthropoda
- Subphylum: Chelicerata
- Class: Arachnida
- Order: Araneae
- Infraorder: Araneomorphae
- Family: Salticidae
- Genus: Sassacus
- Species: S. cyaneus

Binomial name
- Sassacus cyaneus (Hentz, 1846)

Synonyms
- Attus cyaneus Hentz, 1846; Maevia chrysea C. L. Koch, 1846; Homalattus septentrionalis Keyserling, 1885; Agassa georgiana Simon, 1901; Agassa cyanea (Hentz, 1846); Agassa cerulea (Walckenaer, 1837)

= Sassacus cyaneus =

Species of spider

Sassacus cyaneus is a species of jumping spider in the genus Sassacus. It is found across much of North America, from Canada and the United States including New England south to Florida and west to Texas, Missouri, and Wisconsin.

== Etymology ==
The specific name cyaneus derives from the Greek word κυάνεος (kyaneos), meaning "dark blue", referring to the spider's dark metallic coloration.

== Taxonomy ==
Sassacus cyaneus was first described by Nicholas Marcellus Hentz in 1846 as Attus cyaneus. The species has a complex taxonomic history, having been placed in several different genera over time. It was originally classified in the genus Agassa by many authors, but David B. Richman transferred it to Sassacus in 2008, making Agassa a junior synonym of Sassacus.

It seems to be closely related to S. papenhoei, but differs in the form of the carapace.

== Distribution ==
Sassacus cyaneus has been recorded from numerous locations across eastern and central North America. In the United States, it has been documented from Connecticut, Florida, Georgia, Illinois, Massachusetts, Missouri, New Jersey, New York, North Carolina, Ohio, Pennsylvania, South Carolina, Texas, Virginia, West Virginia, and Wisconsin.

== Habitat ==
This species is generally found on small shrubs, small oak trees, and scrub pines. It prefers habitats with woody vegetation where it can hunt for prey and construct retreats.

== Description ==
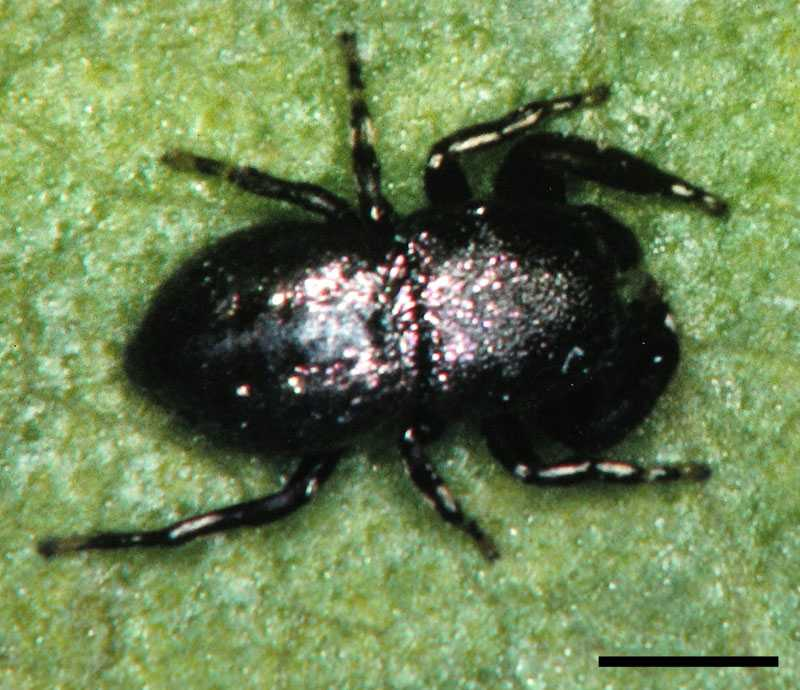
Female

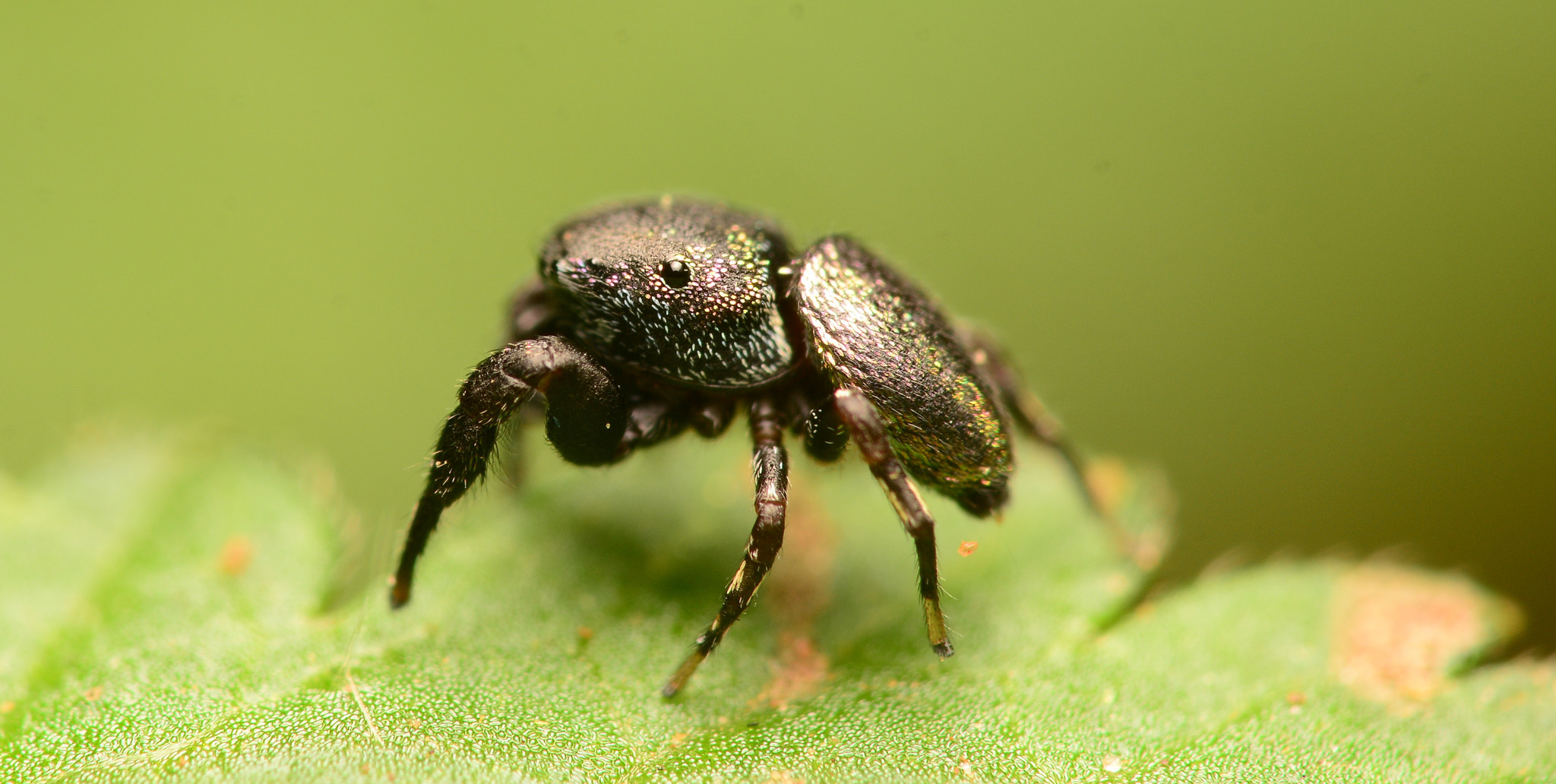
Male

Drawing of female (Koch 1848)

Sassacus cyaneus is described as having a very beetle-like appearance, which distinguishes it from many other jumping spiders.

Both sexes have a distinctive row of setae on the anterior edge of the dorsal abdomen, a characteristic shared with the closely related Sassacus alboguttatus.

=== Females ===
Females have a total length of 3.75-4.8 mm, with a carapace length of 1.5-1.8 mm and width of 1.5-1.6 mm. The leg formula is 4123, meaning the fourth legs are longest. The basic coloration is dark reddish-brown to nearly black, covered with pink (appearing in alcohol) metallic scales.

The carapace is box-like and square to nearly square, enhancing the beetle-like appearance. The pedipalps, chelicerae, clypeus, sternum and endites are reddish-brown, with the endites yellowish anteriorly.

The legs are reddish-brown except for yellow tarsi on the first legs, and there are long hairs on the anterior dorsal opisthosoma.

=== Males ===
Males are smaller, with total length of 2.4-3.35 mm, carapace length of 1.25-1.6 mm, and carapace width of 1.25-1.5 mm. The leg formula is 1423.

The carapace is nearly black with fine metallic pink and green scales both dorsally and ventrally. The palpal bulb and cymbium are dark red-brown, while the chelicerae are red-brown with scattered metallic scales. The legs are generally red-brown except for the metatarsi and tarsi of legs II-IV, which are yellowish with dark brown distal portions.

Like the female, the abdomen is nearly black with metallic pink and green scales.

== Natural history ==
The natural history of Sassacus cyaneus includes seasonal activity patterns documented by Hentz, who noted collections in "April, May, June, etc." Males have been collected in May, while females have been found from June through September.

A female collected in Middlesex County, New Jersey laid 5 eggs in July 1966. Interestingly, one female collected in Gadsden County, Florida in August 1977 was found on a small bush along with numerous leaf beetles in the genus Graphops (Chrysomelidae: Eumolpinae), suggesting possible Batesian mimicry given the spider's beetle-like appearance.
