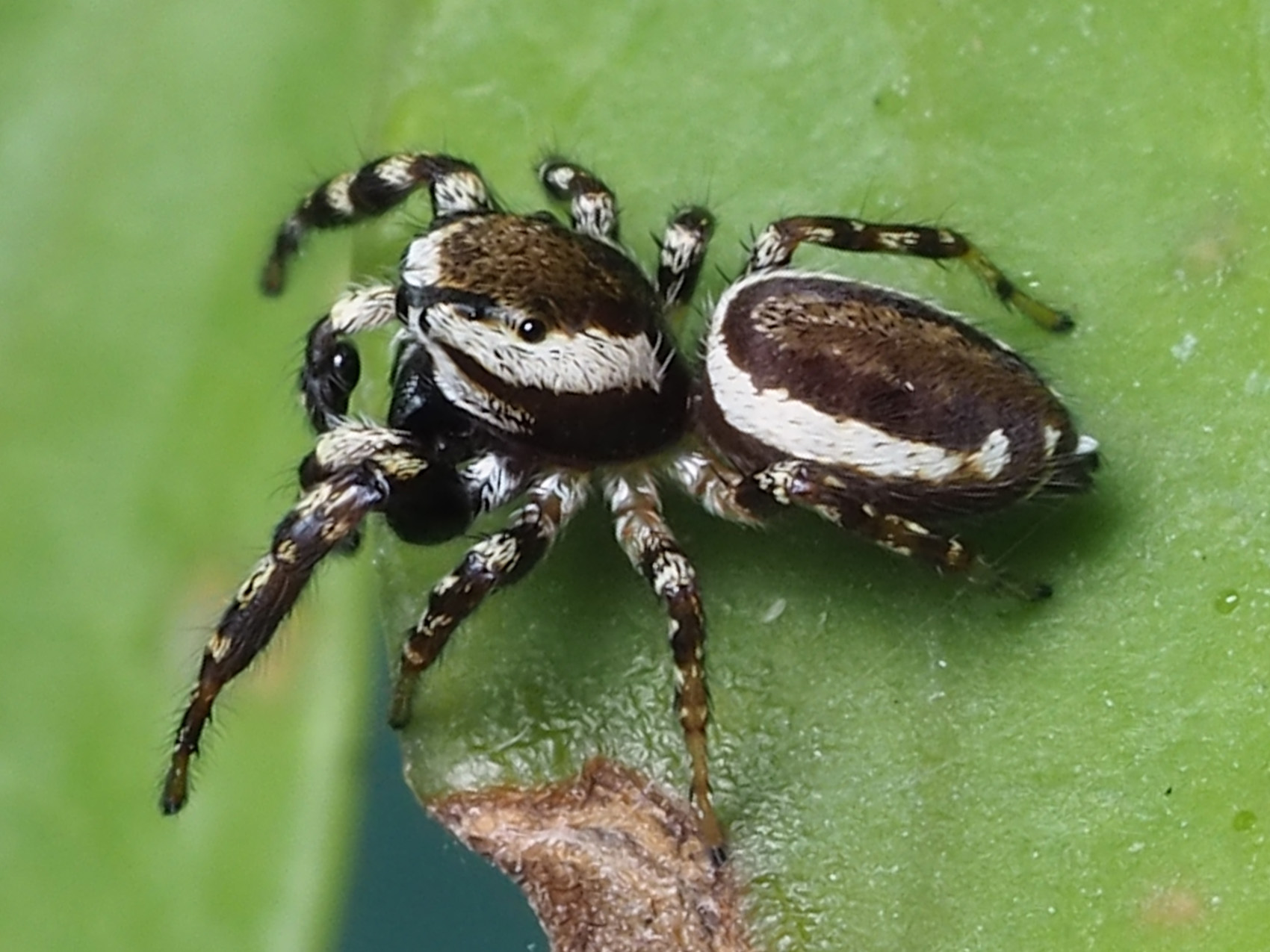
- Male
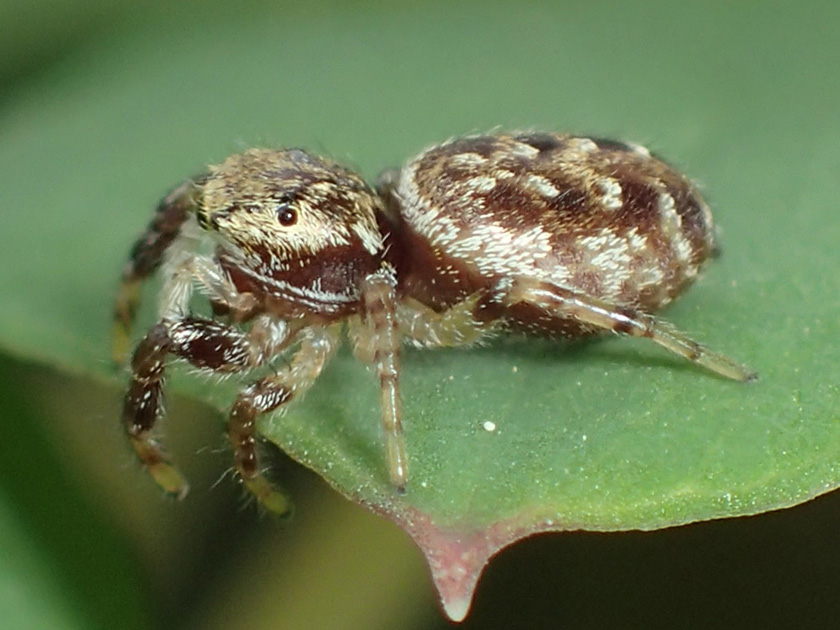
- Female

Scientific classification
- Kingdom: Animalia
- Phylum: Arthropoda
- Subphylum: Chelicerata
- Class: Arachnida
- Order: Araneae
- Infraorder: Araneomorphae
- Family: Salticidae
- Genus: Pelegrina
- Species: P. proterva

Binomial name
- Pelegrina proterva (Walckenaer, 1837)

= Pelegrina proterva =

Species of spider

Pelegrina proterva is a species of jumping spider. It is mainly found in the eastern United States and Canada, but has been reported as far west as British Columbia and Montana. Males range from 3.3 to 4.2 mm in body length and females from 4.4 to 5.6 mm.
