= Pelegrina exigua =

Scientific classification
- Kingdom: Animalia
- Phylum: Arthropoda
- Subphylum: Chelicerata
- Class: Arachnida
- Order: Araneae
- Infraorder: Araneomorphae
- Family: Salticidae
- Genus: Pelegrina
- Species: P. exigua

Binomial name
- Pelegrina exigua (Banks, 1892)

Species of spider

Pelegrina exigua is a species of jumping spider in the family Salticidae. It is found in the United States.
