= Beata pernix =

Scientific classification
- Kingdom: Animalia
- Phylum: Arthropoda
- Subphylum: Chelicerata
- Class: Arachnida
- Order: Araneae
- Infraorder: Araneomorphae
- Family: Salticidae
- Genus: Beata
- Species: B. pernix

Binomial name
- Beata pernix (Peckham & Peckham, 1901)

Synonyms
- Dendryphantes pernix Peckham & Peckham, 1901

Species of spider

Beata pernix is a species of spider in the family Salticidae, found in Brazil.

== Taxonomy ==
Beata pernix was first described by George and Elizabeth Peckham in 1901, as Dendryphantes pernix. It was transferred to the genus Beata by Eugène Simon in 1903.
