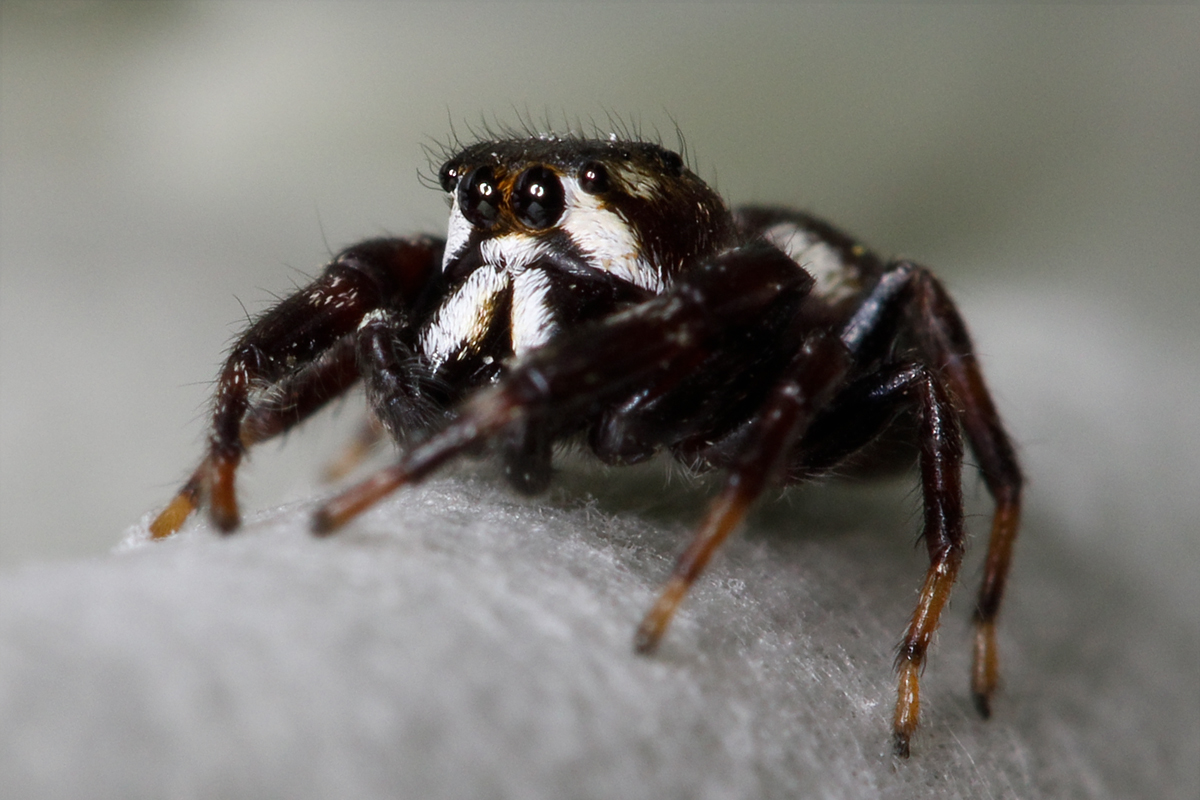
- Male Metaphidippus manni

Scientific classification
- Kingdom: Animalia
- Phylum: Arthropoda
- Subphylum: Chelicerata
- Class: Arachnida
- Order: Araneae
- Infraorder: Araneomorphae
- Family: Salticidae
- Subfamily: Salticinae
- Genus: Metaphidippus; F. O. Pickard-Cambridge, 1901

Type species
- M. mandibulatus F. O. Pickard-Cambridge, 1901

Species
- 46, see text

= Metaphidippus =

Genus of spiders

Metaphidippus is a genus of jumping spiders that was first described by Frederick Octavius Pickard-Cambridge in 1901. The name is combined from Ancient Greek μετά "after, beside" and the salticid genus Phidippus.

== Species ==
As of June 2019 it contains forty-six species, found only in South America, Central America, and North America:

- Metaphidippus albopilosus (Peckham & Peckham, 1901) – Brazil, Paraguay, Argentina
- Metaphidippus annectans (Chamberlin, 1929) – USA
- Metaphidippus apicalis F. O. Pickard-Cambridge, 1901 – Mexico
- Metaphidippus bicavatus F. O. Pickard-Cambridge, 1901 – Panama
- Metaphidippus bisignatus Mello-Leitão, 1945 – Argentina
- Metaphidippus bispinosus F. O. Pickard-Cambridge, 1901 – Central America
- Metaphidippus carmenensis (Chamberlin, 1924) – USA, Mexico
- Metaphidippus chalcedon (C. L. Koch, 1846) – Brazil
- Metaphidippus chera (Chamberlin, 1924) – USA, Mexico
- Metaphidippus coccinelloides Mello-Leitão, 1947 – Brazil
- Metaphidippus comptus (Banks, 1909) – Costa Rica
- Metaphidippus crassidens (Kraus, 1955) – El Salvador
- Metaphidippus cupreus F. O. Pickard-Cambridge, 1901 – Panama
- Metaphidippus cuprinus (Taczanowski, 1878) – Peru
- Metaphidippus diplacis (Chamberlin, 1924) – USA, Mexico
- Metaphidippus dubitabilis (Peckham & Peckham, 1896) – Mexico
- Metaphidippus emmiltus Maddison, 1996 – USA
- Metaphidippus facetus Chickering, 1946 – Panama
- Metaphidippus fastosus Chickering, 1946 – Panama
- Metaphidippus fimbriatus (F. O. Pickard-Cambridge, 1901) – Guatemala
- Metaphidippus fortunatus (Peckham & Peckham, 1901) – Brazil
- Metaphidippus globosus F. O. Pickard-Cambridge, 1901 – Costa Rica
- Metaphidippus gratus Bryant, 1948 – Mexico
- Metaphidippus inflatus F. O. Pickard-Cambridge, 1901 – Guatemala
- Metaphidippus iridescens F. O. Pickard-Cambridge, 1901 – El Salvador, Panama
- Metaphidippus iviei (Roewer, 1951) – USA
- Metaphidippus laetabilis (Peckham & Peckham, 1896) – Panama
- Metaphidippus laetificus Chickering, 1946 – Panama
- Metaphidippus lanceolatus F. O. Pickard-Cambridge, 1901 – Mexico to Costa Rica
- Metaphidippus longipalpus F. O. Pickard-Cambridge, 1901 – USA, Panama
- Metaphidippus mandibulatus F. O. Pickard-Cambridge, 1901 (type) – Costa Rica
- Metaphidippus manni (Peckham & Peckham, 1901) – North America
- Metaphidippus nigropictus F. O. Pickard-Cambridge, 1901 – Mexico
- Metaphidippus nitidus (Peckham & Peckham, 1896) – Guatemala
- Metaphidippus odiosus (Peckham & Peckham, 1901) – Brazil, Argentina
- Metaphidippus ovatus F. O. Pickard-Cambridge, 1901 – Guatemala
- Metaphidippus pallens F. O. Pickard-Cambridge, 1901 – Guatemala to Costa Rica
- Metaphidippus perfectus (Peckham & Peckham, 1901) – Brazil
- Metaphidippus pernix F. O. Pickard-Cambridge, 1901 – Guatemala
- Metaphidippus perscitus Chickering, 1946 – Panama
- Metaphidippus pluripunctatus Mello-Leitão, 1944 – Argentina
- Metaphidippus quadrinotatus F. O. Pickard-Cambridge, 1901 – Costa Rica, Panama
- Metaphidippus siticulosus (Peckham & Peckham, 1909) – USA
- Metaphidippus smithi (Peckham & Peckham, 1901) – Brazil
- Metaphidippus texanus (Banks, 1904) – USA
- Metaphidippus tropicus (Peckham & Peckham, 1901) – Brazil, Argentina
