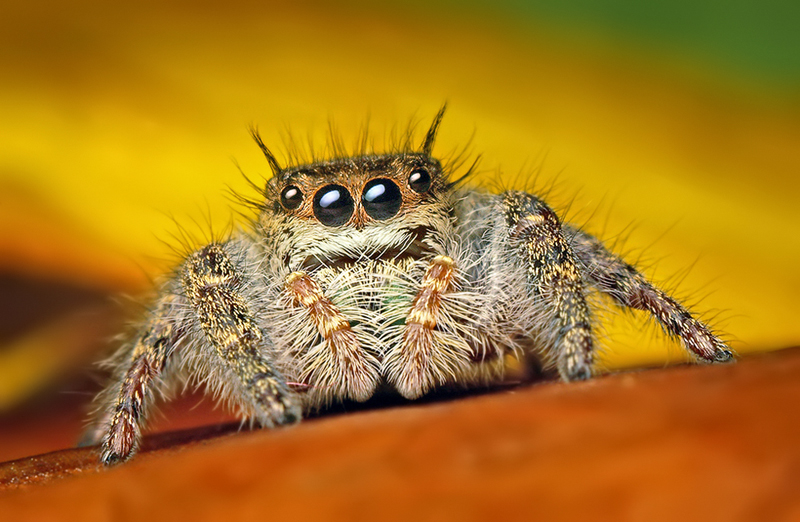
- Phidippus princeps

Scientific classification
- Kingdom: Animalia
- Phylum: Arthropoda
- Subphylum: Chelicerata
- Class: Arachnida
- Order: Araneae
- Infraorder: Araneomorphae
- Family: Salticidae
- Subfamily: Salticinae
- Tribe: Dendryphantini
- Subtribe: Dendryphantina; Menge, 1879

Genera
- See text

Diversity
- 54 genera

= Dendryphantina =

Subtribe of spiders

The Dendryphantina are a subtribe of jumping spiders that occur mainly in the New World. The subtribe was first defined by Anton Menge in 1879 as Dendryphantidae. Females of the subtribe generally show paired spots on the abdomen, and the males often have enlarged chelicerae. Females in this subtribe typically have S-shaped epigynal openings.

== Taxonomy ==
As of 2015, Dendryphantina includes the following genera:

- Alcmena C. L. Koch, 1846 — South America to Mexico
- Anokopsis Bauab & Soares, 1980 — Brazil
- Anicius Chamberlin, 1925 — Mexico
- Ashtabula Peckham & Peckham, 1894 — Brazil to Panama
- Avitus Peckham & Peckham, 1896 — Argentina to Panama, Jamaica
- Bagheera Peckham & Peckham, 1896 — Guatemala to Mexico
- Beata Peckham & Peckham, 1895 — South America, Madagascar
- Bellota Peckham & Peckham, 1892 — Americas, Pakistan
- Bryantella Chickering, 1946 — Panama to Argentina
- Cerionesta Simon, 1901 — Guyana, St. Vincent
- Chirothecia Taczanowski, 1878 — South America
- Dendryphantes C. L. Koch, 1837 — Eurasia, Africa, Americas
- Donaldius Chickering, 1946 — Panama
- Eris C. L. Koch, 1846 — Alaska to Ecuador
- Fritzia O. P.-Cambridge, 1879 — Brazil, Argentina
- Gastromicans Mello-Leitão, 1917 — South, Central America
- Ghelna Maddison, 1996 — North America
- Hentzia Marx, 1883 — Americas
- Lurio Simon, 1901 — South America
- Mabellina Chickering, 1946 — Panama
- Macaroeris Wunderlich, 1992 — Eurasia
- Mburuvicha Scioscia, 1993 — Argentina
- Messua Peckham & Peckham, 1896 — Central America
- Metaphidippus F. O. P-Cambridge, 1901 — Americas
- Mirandia Badcock, 1932 — Paraguay
- Monaga Chickering, 1946 — Panama
- Nagaina Peckham & Peckham, 1896 — South America to Mexico
- Naubolus Simon, 1901 — South America
- Osericta Simon, 1901 — Peru, Brazil
- Paradamoetas Peckham & Peckham, 1885 — Canada to Panama
- Paraphidippus F. O. P.-Cambridge, 1901 — USA to Panama
- Parnaenus Peckham & Peckham, 1896 — Central, South America
- Pelegrina Franganillo, 1930 — Canada to Panama
- Phanias F. O. P.-Cambridge, 1901 — USA to El Salvador, Galapagos
- Phidippus C. L. Koch, 1846 — North America
- Planiemen Wesołowska & van Harten, 2007 — Yemen
- Poultonella Peckham & Peckham, 1909 — USA
- Pseudofluda Mello-Leitão, 1928 — Brazil
- Pseudopartona Caporiacco, 1954 — French Guiana
- Rhene Thorell, 1869 — Asia, Africa, South America
- Rhetenor Simon, 1902 — USA, Mexico, Brazil
- Rudra Peckham & Peckham, 1885 — South America to Guatemala
- Sassacus Peckham & Peckham, 1895 — Americas
- Sebastira Simon, 1901 — Venezuela, Panama
- Selimus Peckham & Peckham, 1901 — Brazil
- Semora Peckham & Peckham, 1892 — South America
- Tacuna Peckham & Peckham, 1901 — Brazil, Argentina
- Terralonus Maddison, 1996 — USA
- Thammaca Simon, 1902 — Peru, Brazil
- Tulpius Peckham & Peckham, 1896 — Brazil, Guatemala
- Tutelina Simon, 1901 — Canada to Ecuador
- Tuvaphantes Logunov, 1993 — Russia
- Uluella Chickering, 1946 — Panama
- Xuriella Wesołowska & Russell-Smith, 2000 — Tanzania, Yemen
- Zeuxippus Thorell, 1891 — Asia
- Zygoballus Peckham & Peckham, 1885 — Americas
