= Rudrasena I =

Rudrasena I may refer to these kings of ancient India:

- Rudrasena I (Saka king) (r. 200–222), of the Western Satraps
- Rudrasena I (Vakataka king) (r. 330–355)

== See also ==
- Rudra (disambiguation)
- Sena (disambiguation)
- Rudrasena II, king of the Vakataka dynasty
- Rudrasen II, 3rd-century king of the Western Satraps
- Rudrasena II (Western Satrap), another 3rd-century king of the Western Satraps
- Rudrasen Chaudhary, an Indian politician
