= M. australis =

M. australis may refer to:

- Malacosteus australis, the Southern stoplight loosejaw, a small, deep-sea dragonfish species
- Marsdenia australis, the bush banana, silky pear or green vine, a plant species native to Australia
- Megascolides australis, the giant gippsland earthworm, an earthworm species native to Australia
- Mentha australis, the river mint, native mint, native peppermint and Australian mint, a mint species native of eastern Australia
- Microcavia australis, the Southern mountain cavy, a rodent species found in Argentina, Bolivia and Chile
- Micromesistius australis, the southern blue whiting, a cod species found in the southern oceans
- Mirandia australis, a jumping spider species found in Paraguay
- Morus australis, the Chinese mulberry, a flowering plant species found in South-East Asia
- Myliobatis australis, the Australian bull ray or southern eagle ray, a large ray species of temperate waters of Australia
- Myrsine australis, the red matipo or mapou, a shrub species endemic to New Zealand

== See also ==
- Australis (disambiguation)
