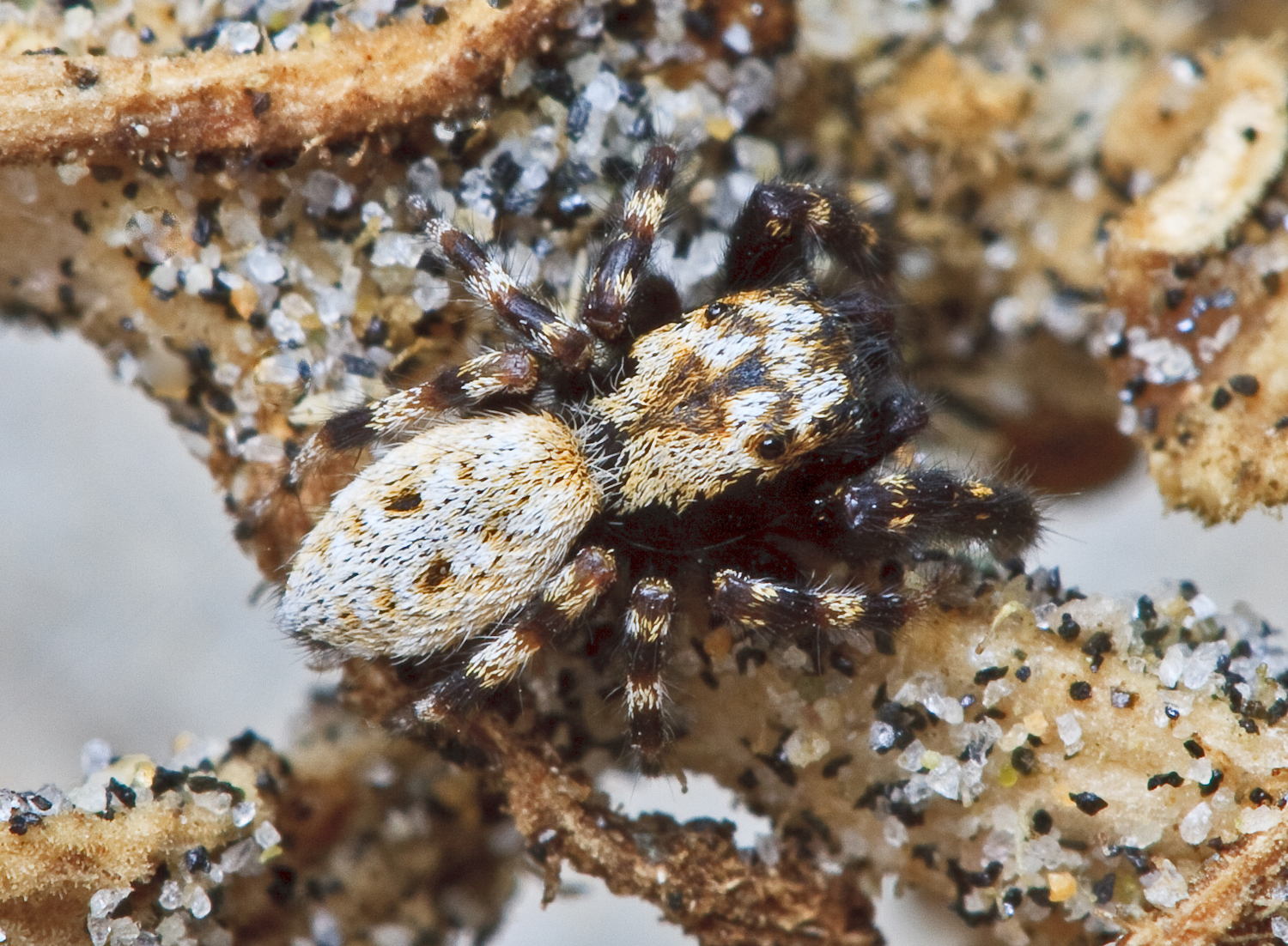

Scientific classification
- Kingdom: Animalia
- Phylum: Arthropoda
- Subphylum: Chelicerata
- Class: Arachnida
- Order: Araneae
- Infraorder: Araneomorphae
- Family: Salticidae
- Genus: Terralonus
- Species: T. californicus

Binomial name
- Terralonus californicus (Peckham & Peckham, 1888)

= Terralonus californicus =

Species of spider

Terralonus californicus, the intertidal jumping spider or beach jumping spider, is a species of jumping spider in the family Salticidae. The species is found in North America, ranging from coastal regions along the Pacific ocean from southern British Columbia to Baja California. It is one of the few spiders known to regularly inhabit beaches, being found alongside sandy coastlines and intertidal zones. In this environment these spiders prey upon other beachside inhabiting arthropods, likely those that are drawn towards debris that has washed along shorelines. Such arthropods can include beach hopper amphipods and flies. Both males and females have varied mixed colorations of typically black, gray and tan which help with camoflouge in their beachside environments. Sizes range from 3 to 5 millimeters in length. Physically this species appears similar to other members in its genus Terralonus, so its environmental context of being found in beaches is its primary identification measure. Males possess elongated forelimbs compared to females, which are used both in territorial aggression towards other males and as displays in courtship towards females.

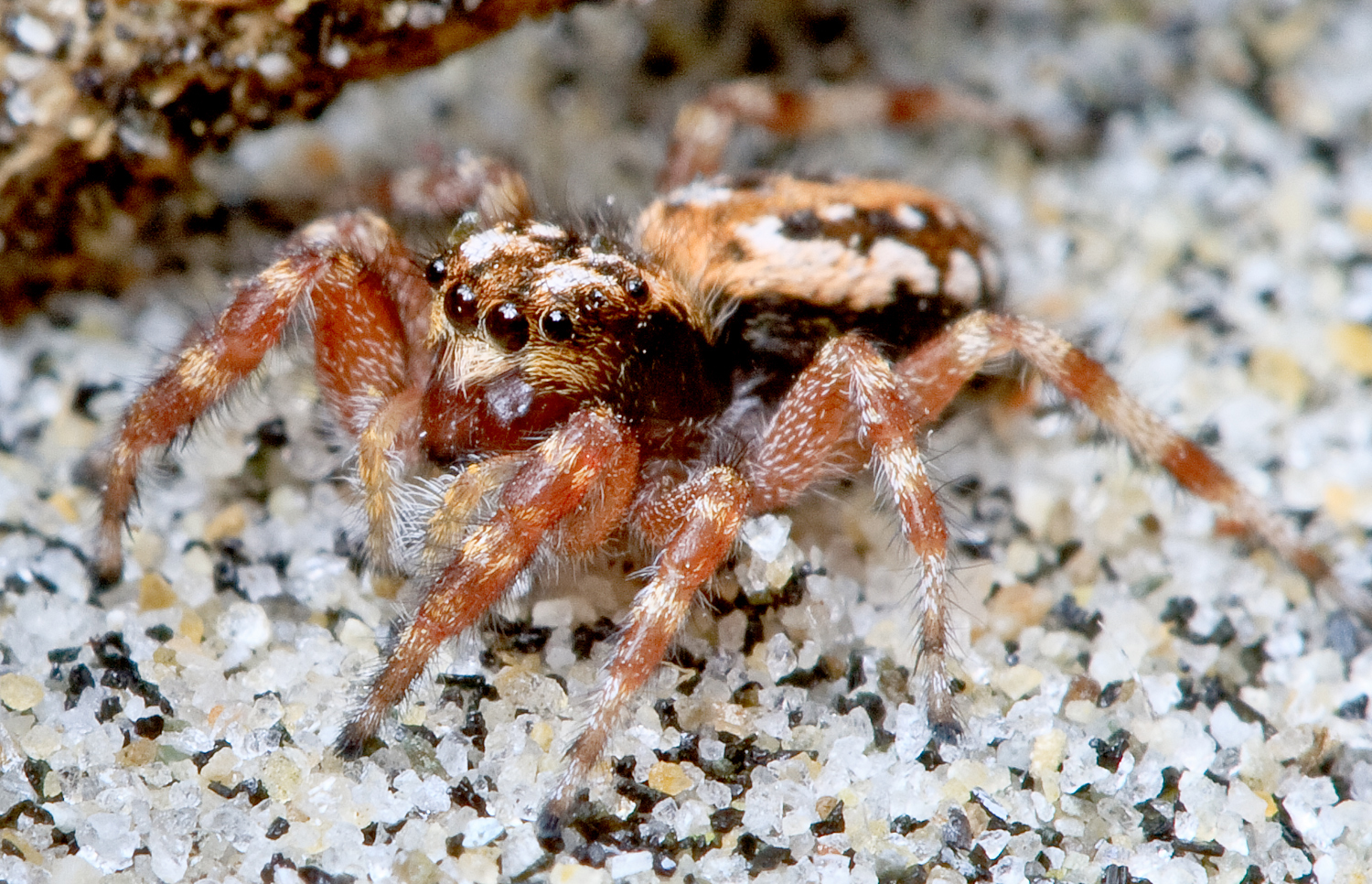

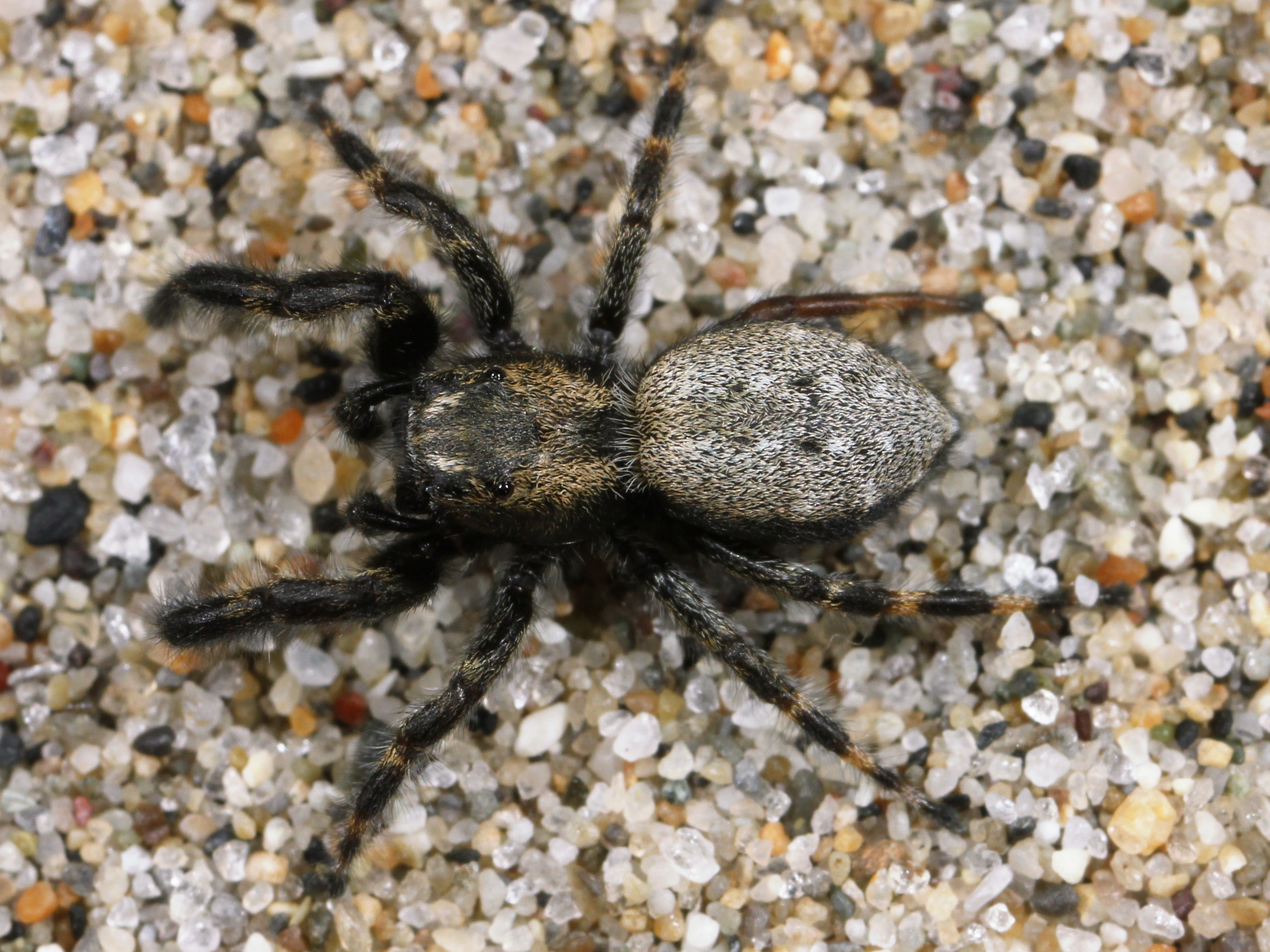
