= Rudra (disambiguation) =

Rudra is a Rigvedic god of the storm, the hunt, death, nature and the wind.

Rudra may also refer to:

- Rudras, followers or aspect of Rudra
- Rudra Sampradaya, a Hindu Vaishnava sampradaya (tradition)
- Rudra, the eleventh chakra (group) of Melakarta ragas
- Rudra (film), a 1989 Indian Kannada-language film directed by K. S. R. Das
- Rudhra, a 1991 Indian film
- Rudhra (caste), an Indian caste
- Rudra (band), a Singaporean death metal band
- Rudra (spider), a genus of jumping spider
- Rudra: Boom Chik Chik Boom, an Indian animated television series
- Rudra: The Edge of Darkness, an Indian crime drama television series
- Rudra, fictional character from the 2018 Indian horror-comedy film Stree, played by Pankaj Tripathi
- "Rudra", an episode of the Indian TV series Sacred Games
- Rudra (Devil May Cry), one of the bosses in Devil May Cry 3: Dante's Awakening
- Treasure of the Rudras, a role-playing video game released by Square in 1996
- HAL Rudra, the WSI (Weapon Systems Integrated) version of HAL Dhruv
- Rudra (actress), Indian film and television actress
- 2629 Rudra, a Mars-crossing asteroid
- Rudradeva, 12th century Kakatiya ruler of southern India
  - Rudra, a Himalayan peak in Himachal Pradesh, India, described as being located at 32°10′54.43″N 78°36′07.65″E and rising above 5,100 metres.

== See also ==
- Rudhran, a 2023 Indian Tamil-language film
- Roudram, a 2008 Indian film
- Roudram 2018, a 2019 Indian Malayalam-language film
- Roudram Ranam Rudhiram or RRR, a 2022 Indian film by S. S. Rajamouli
- Rudra Thandavam (disambiguation)
