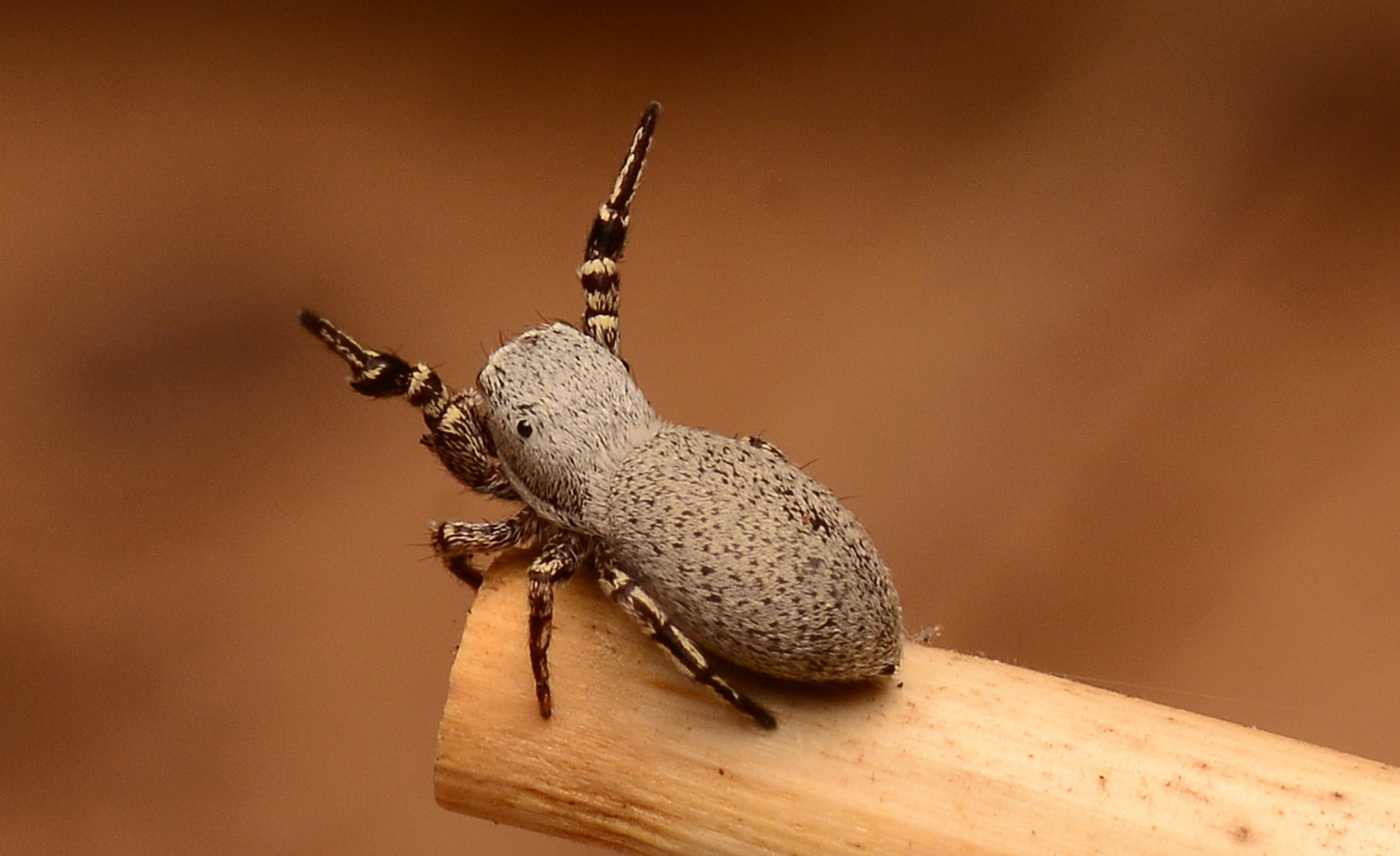

Scientific classification
- Kingdom: Animalia
- Phylum: Arthropoda
- Subphylum: Chelicerata
- Class: Arachnida
- Order: Araneae
- Infraorder: Araneomorphae
- Family: Salticidae
- Genus: Poultonella
- Species: P. alboimmaculata

Binomial name
- Poultonella alboimmaculata (Peckham & Peckham, 1883)

= Poultonella alboimmaculata =

Species of arachnid

Poultonella alboimmaculata is a species of jumping spider in the family Salticidae. It is found in the United States.

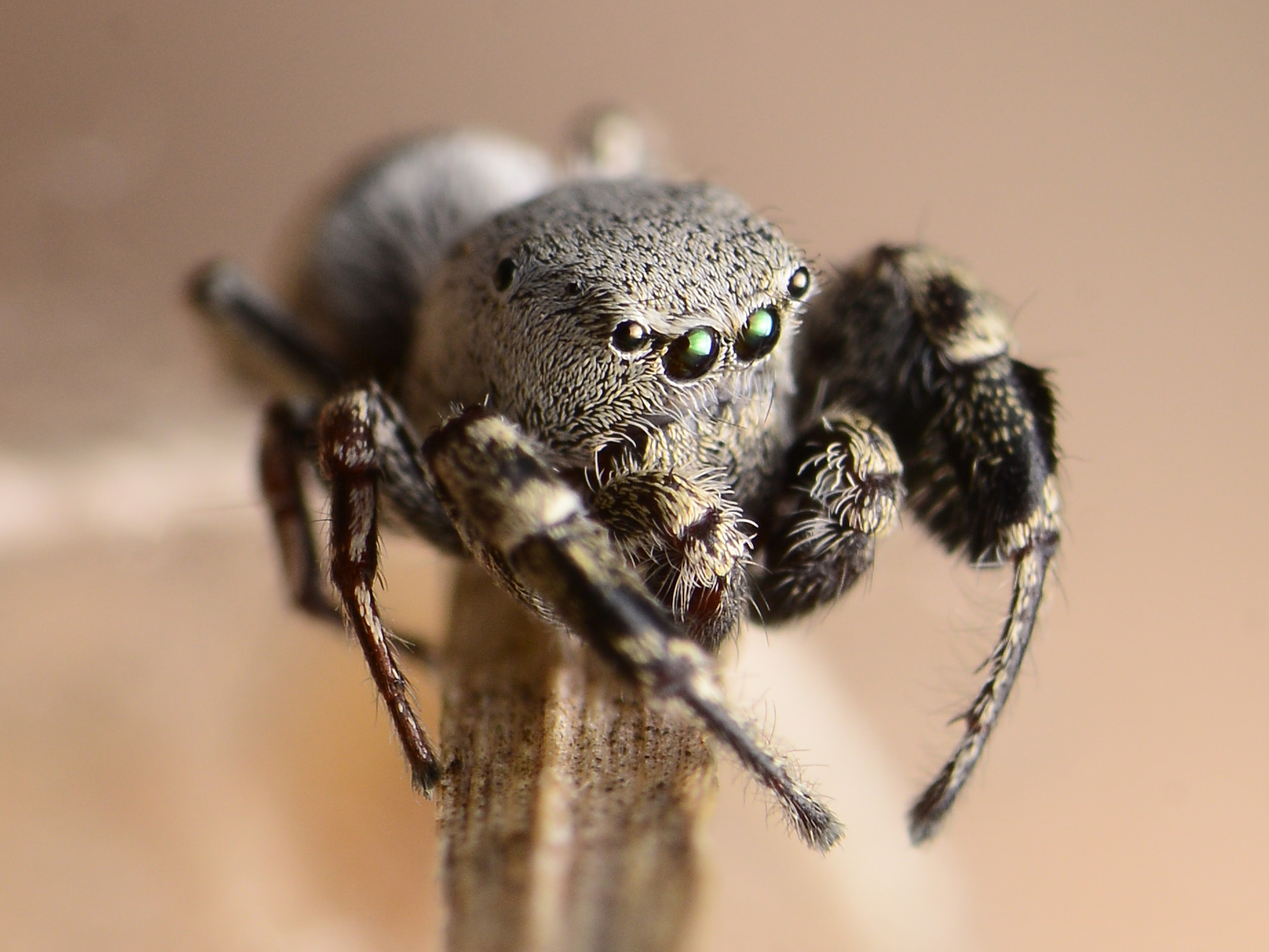
Adult male

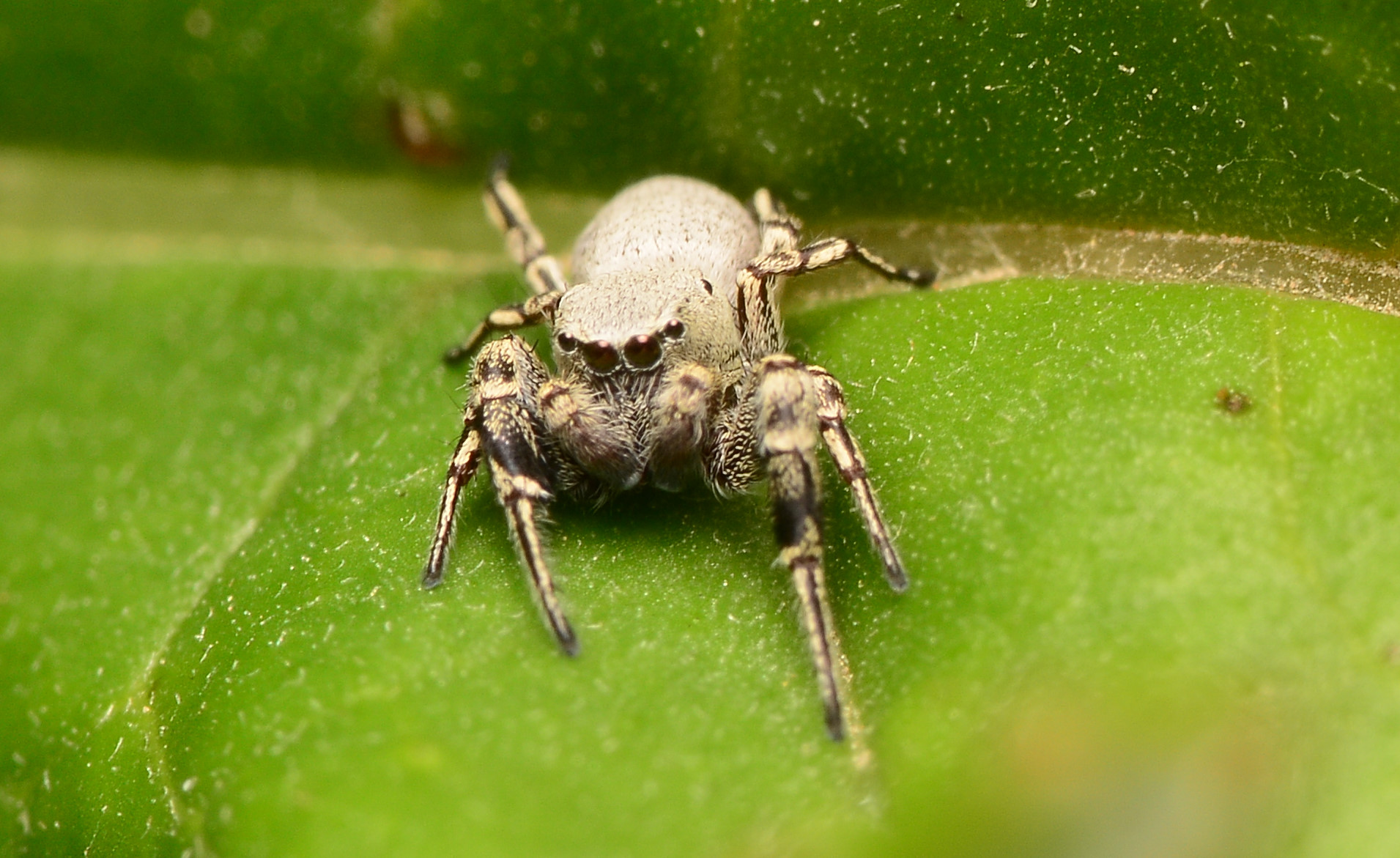
Ambushing ants

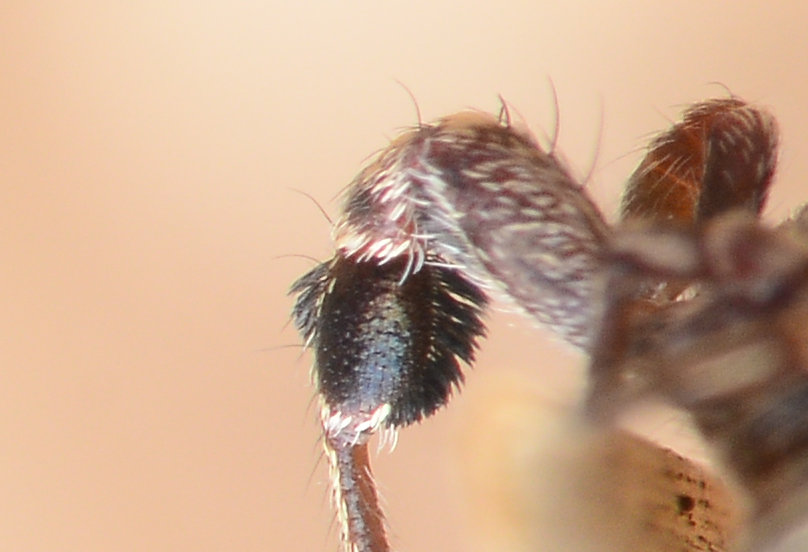
Characteristic mark of the species. Adult male and females, as well as all but the earliest instar juveniles, have heavy black brushing on their front legs
