= Hermosa (spider) =

Scientific classification
- Kingdom: Animalia
- Phylum: Arthropoda
- Subphylum: Chelicerata
- Class: Arachnida
- Order: Araneae
- Infraorder: Araneomorphae
- Family: Salticidae
- Subfamily: Salticinae
- Genus: Hermosa; G. W. Peckham & E. G. Peckham, 1892

Type species
- H. volatilis G. W. Peckham & E. G. Peckham, 1892

Species
- 7, see text

Synonyms
- Myrmavola Prószyński, 2016

Genus of jumping spiders

Hermosa is a genus of jumping spiders first described by G. W. Peckham and E. G. Peckham in 1892, and synonymized with Myrmarachne in 1901. In 2016, Jerzy Prószyński split up Myrmarachne, creating nine new genera, all with names beginning "Myrm". However, it turned out that Myrmavola volatilis, the type species of Myrmavola, was also the type species of Hermosa, and Myrmavola was made a junior synonym. It is part of the Myrmarachnini tribe within the Salticoida clade of Salticinae.

== Species ==
As of April 2022 it contains seven species:

- H. andrewi (Wanless, 1978) – Congo, Angola
- H. brevichelicera (Yamasaki & Ahmad, 2013) – Malaysia (Borneo)
- H. christae (Prószyński, 2001) – Malaysia (Borneo)
- H. galianoae (Prószyński, 2001) – Malaysia (Borneo)
- H. volatilis G. W. Peckham & E. G. Peckham, 1892 (type) – Madagascar, China, Vietnam
- H. yamanei (Yamasaki, 2012) – Indonesia (Sulawesi)
- H. yamasakii (Prószyński, 2016) – Malaysia (Borneo)

== See also ==
- Myrmarachne
- Damoetas
- List of Salticidae genera
