= Rudra Thandavam =

Rudra Thandavam (lit. 'Rudra Tandava') may refer to these Indian Tamil-language films:

- Rudra Thandavam (1978 film)
- Rudra Thandavam (2021 film)

== See also ==
- Rudra (disambiguation)
- Tandava, a dance by the Hindu god Shiva (Rudra)
