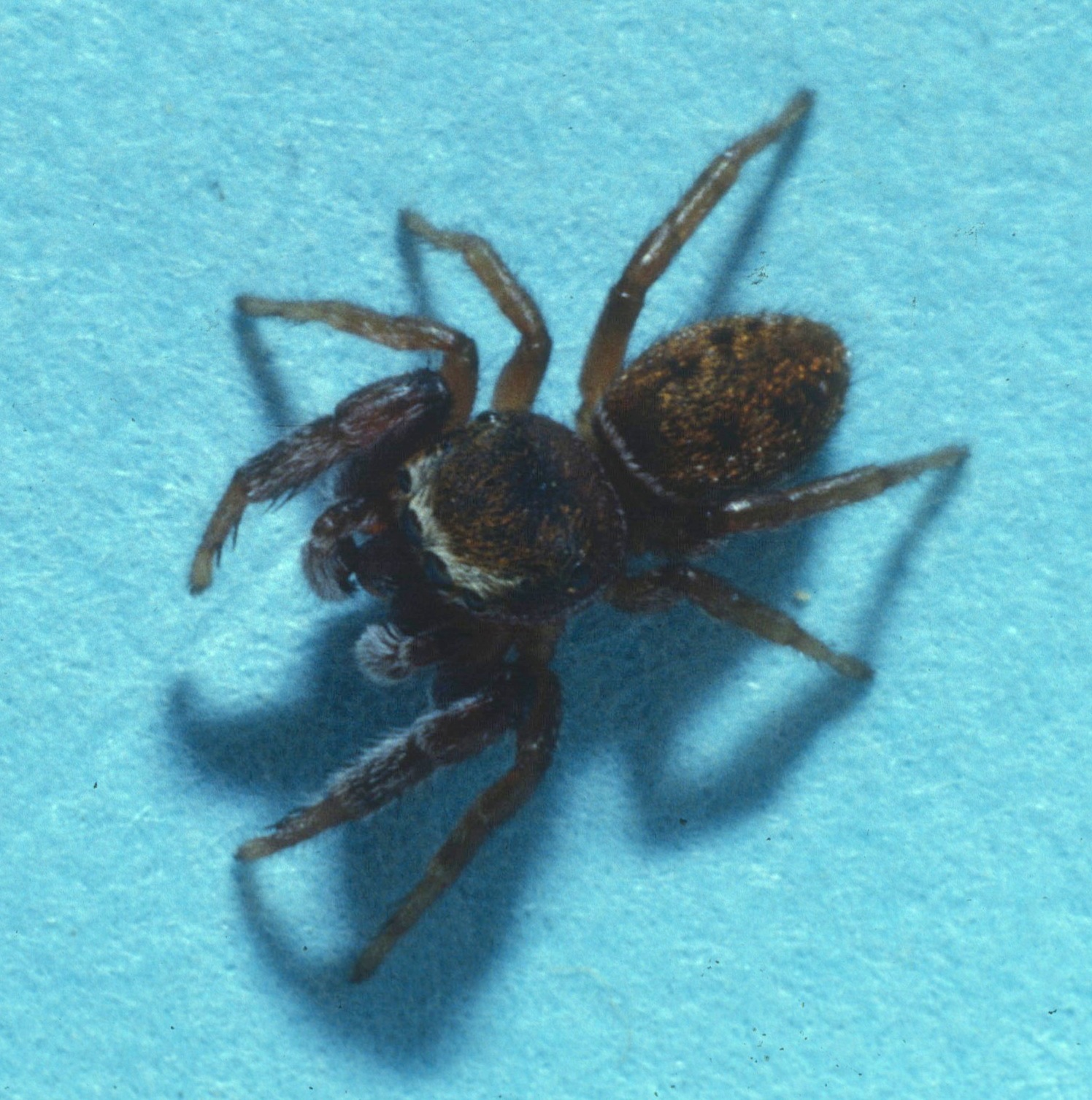
- Male in New Brunswick, Canada

Scientific classification
- Kingdom: Animalia
- Phylum: Arthropoda
- Subphylum: Chelicerata
- Class: Arachnida
- Order: Araneae
- Infraorder: Araneomorphae
- Family: Salticidae
- Genus: Ghelna
- Species: G. canadensis

Binomial name
- Ghelna canadensis (Banks, 1897)

= Ghelna canadensis =

Species of spider

Ghelna canadensis is a species of jumping spider in the family Salticidae. It is found in the United States and Canada.
