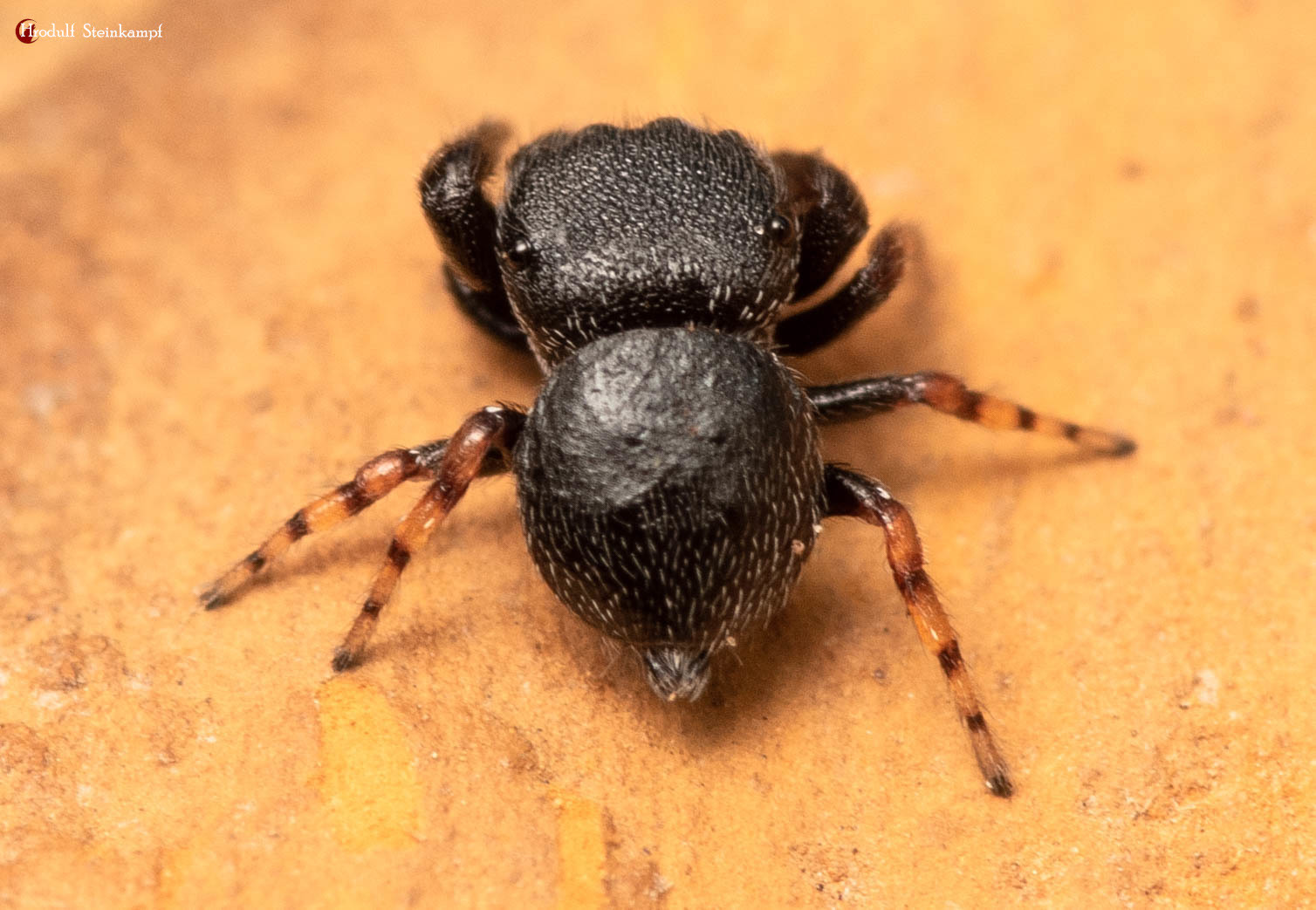
- male X. prima
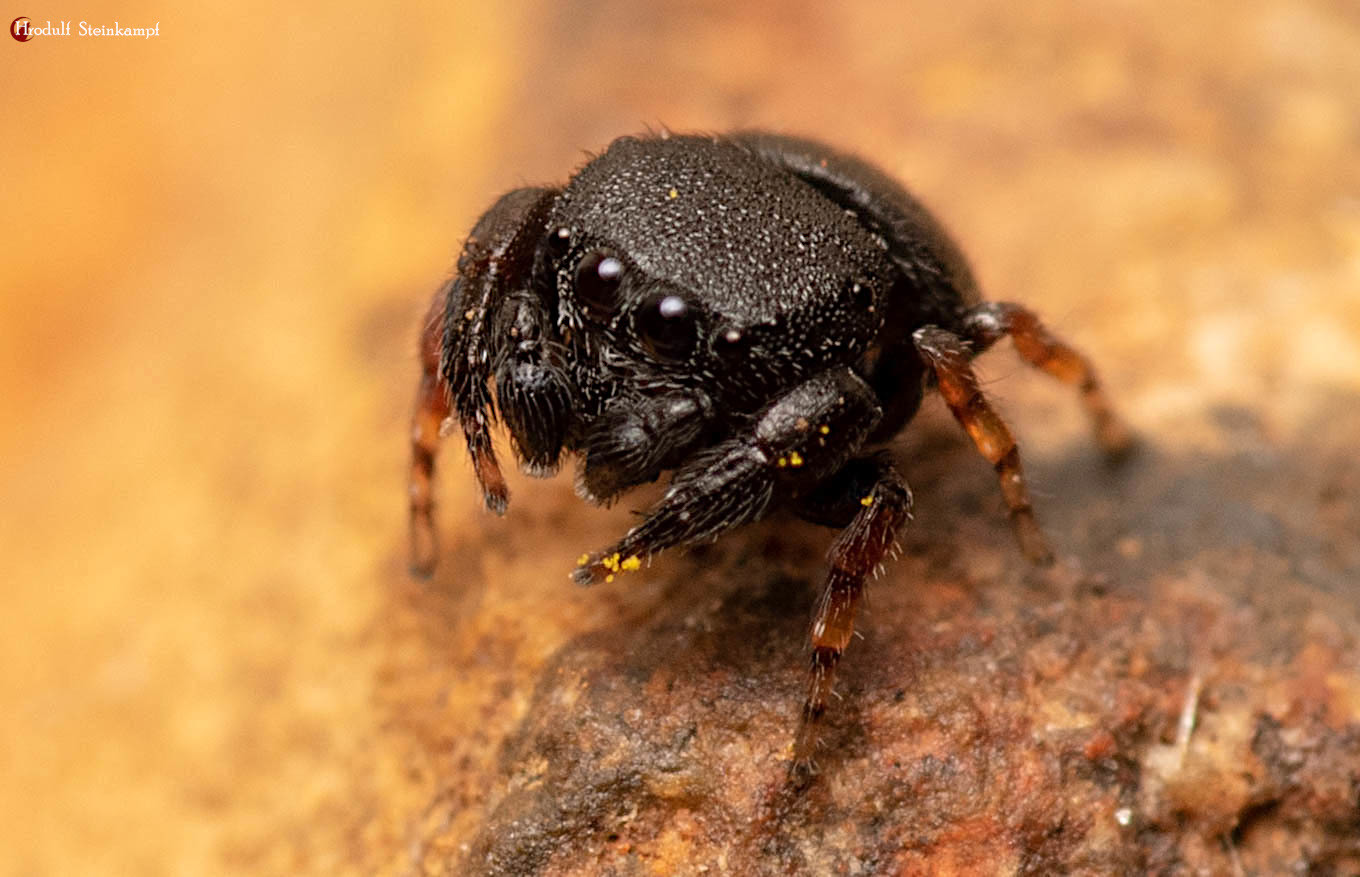
- male X. prima

Scientific classification
- Kingdom: Animalia
- Phylum: Arthropoda
- Subphylum: Chelicerata
- Class: Arachnida
- Order: Araneae
- Infraorder: Araneomorphae
- Family: Salticidae
- Genus: Xuriella
- Species: X. prima

Binomial name
- Xuriella prima Wesołowska & Russell-Smith, 2000

= Xuriella prima =

Species of spider

Xuriella prima is the type species of jumping spider in the genus Xuriella first described in 2000 by Wanda Wesołowska and Anthony Russell-Smith. First discovered in Tanzania, it has also been identified in South Africa and Zimbabwe.

== Description ==
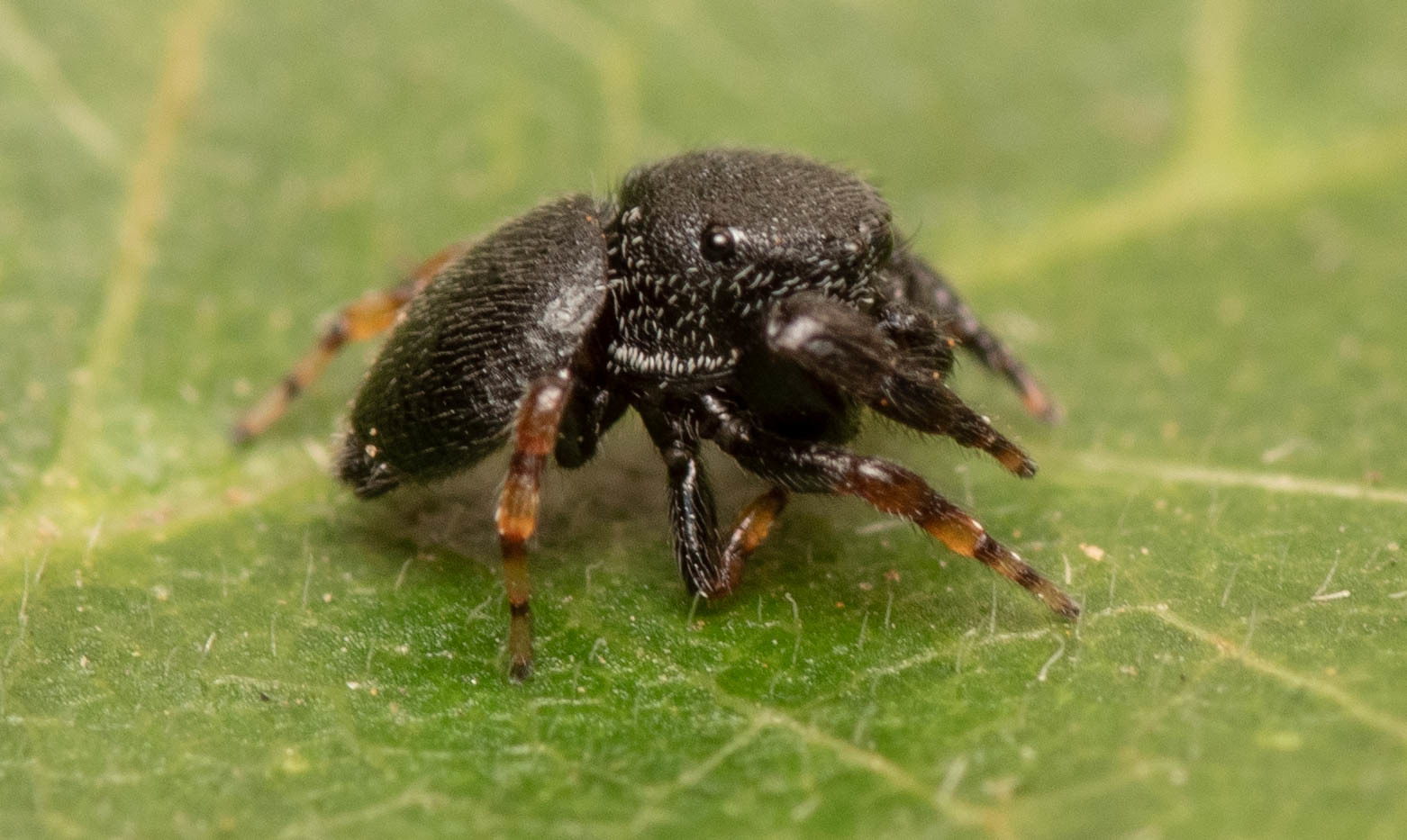
male

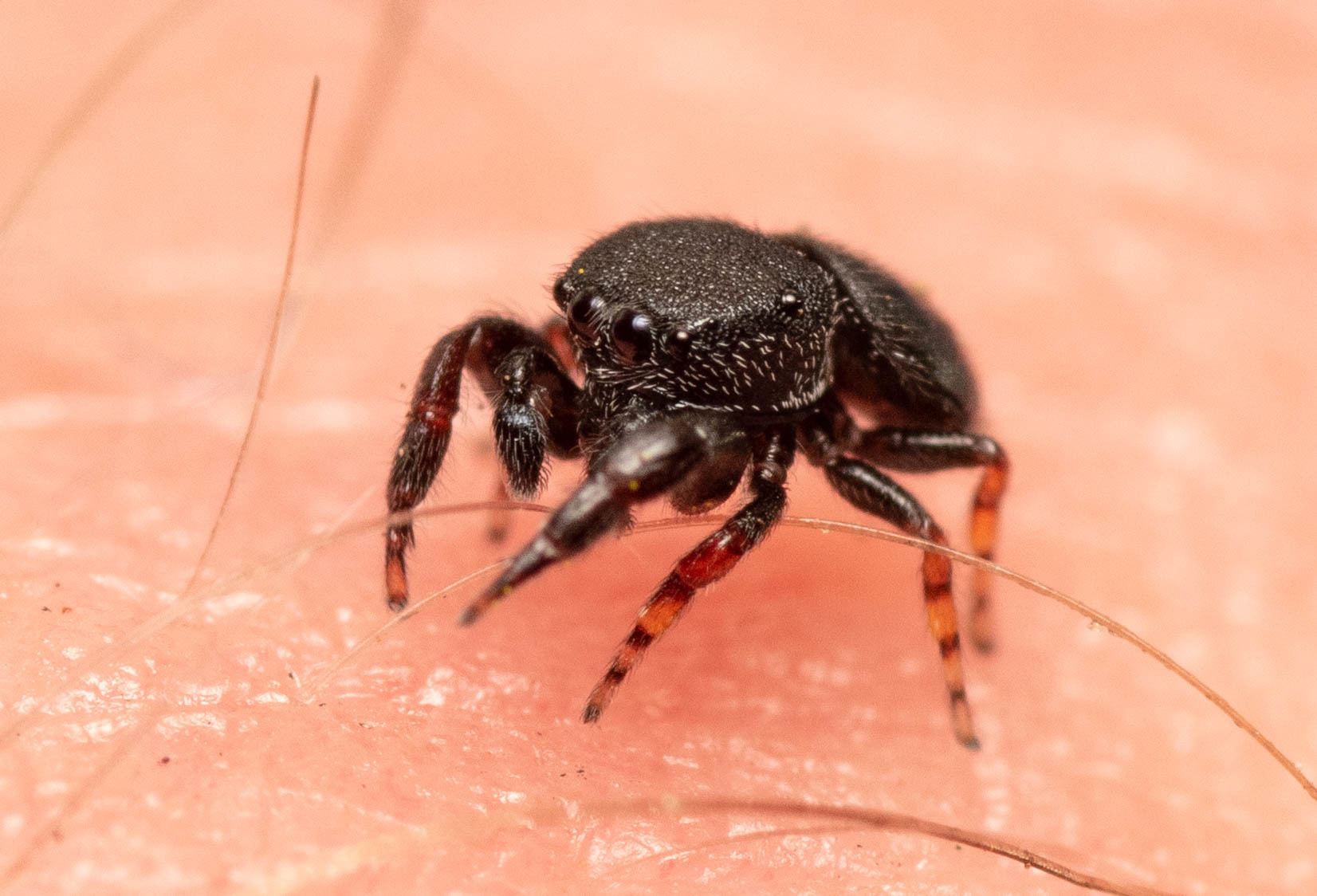
male

Xuriella prima is a small and flattened spider, 3 millimetres (1/8 in) long.

== Etymology ==
The species name is derived from the Latin for first as it is the first of the genus to be identified and is thus the type species for the genus Xuriella.

== Distribution ==
Xuriella prima was first described from examples found in the Mkomazi National Park in Tanzania in 2000 by Wanda Wesołowska and Anthony Russell-Smith. Subsequently, the species was also identified in South Africa and Zimbabwe.
