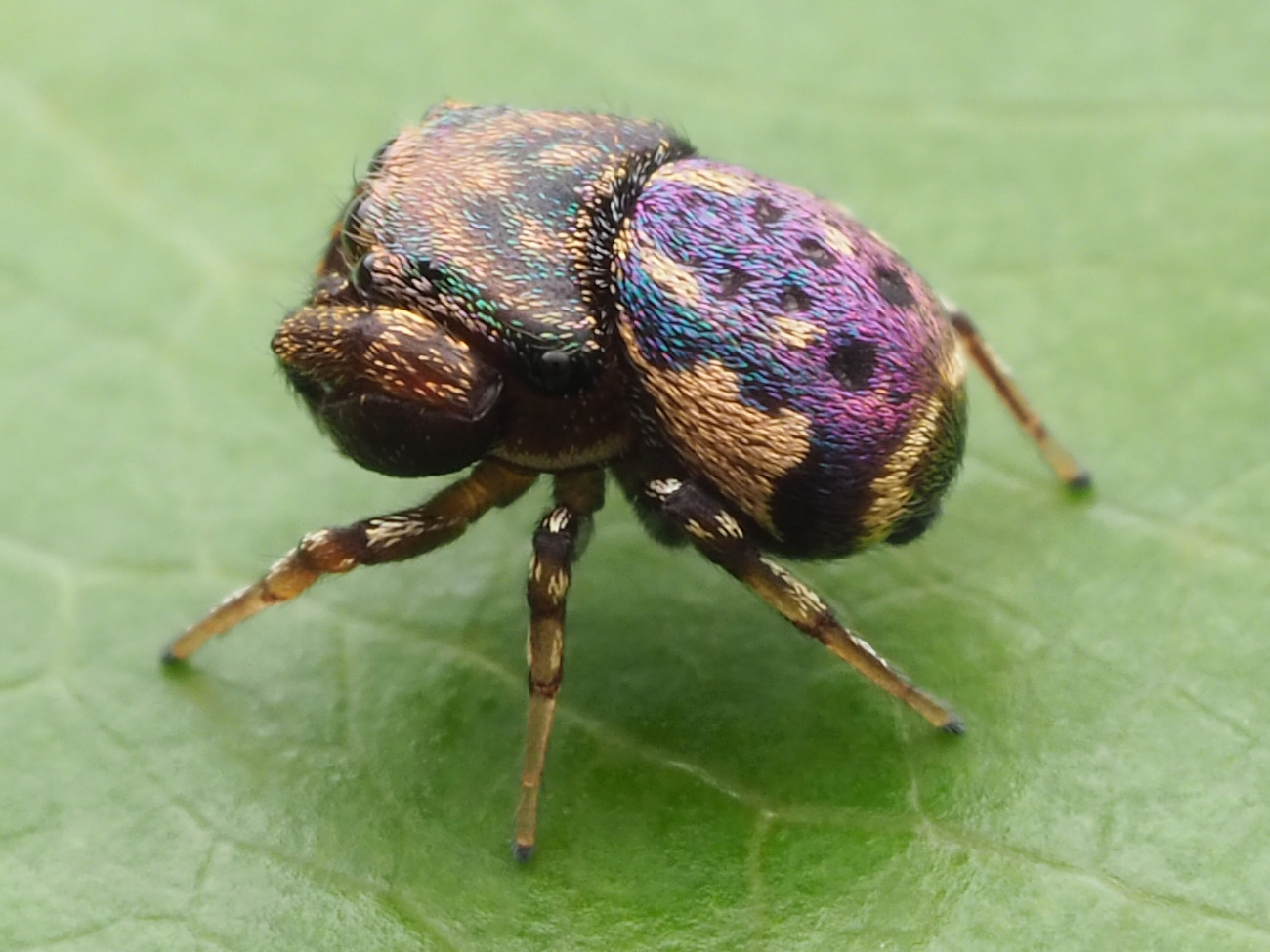
- Female
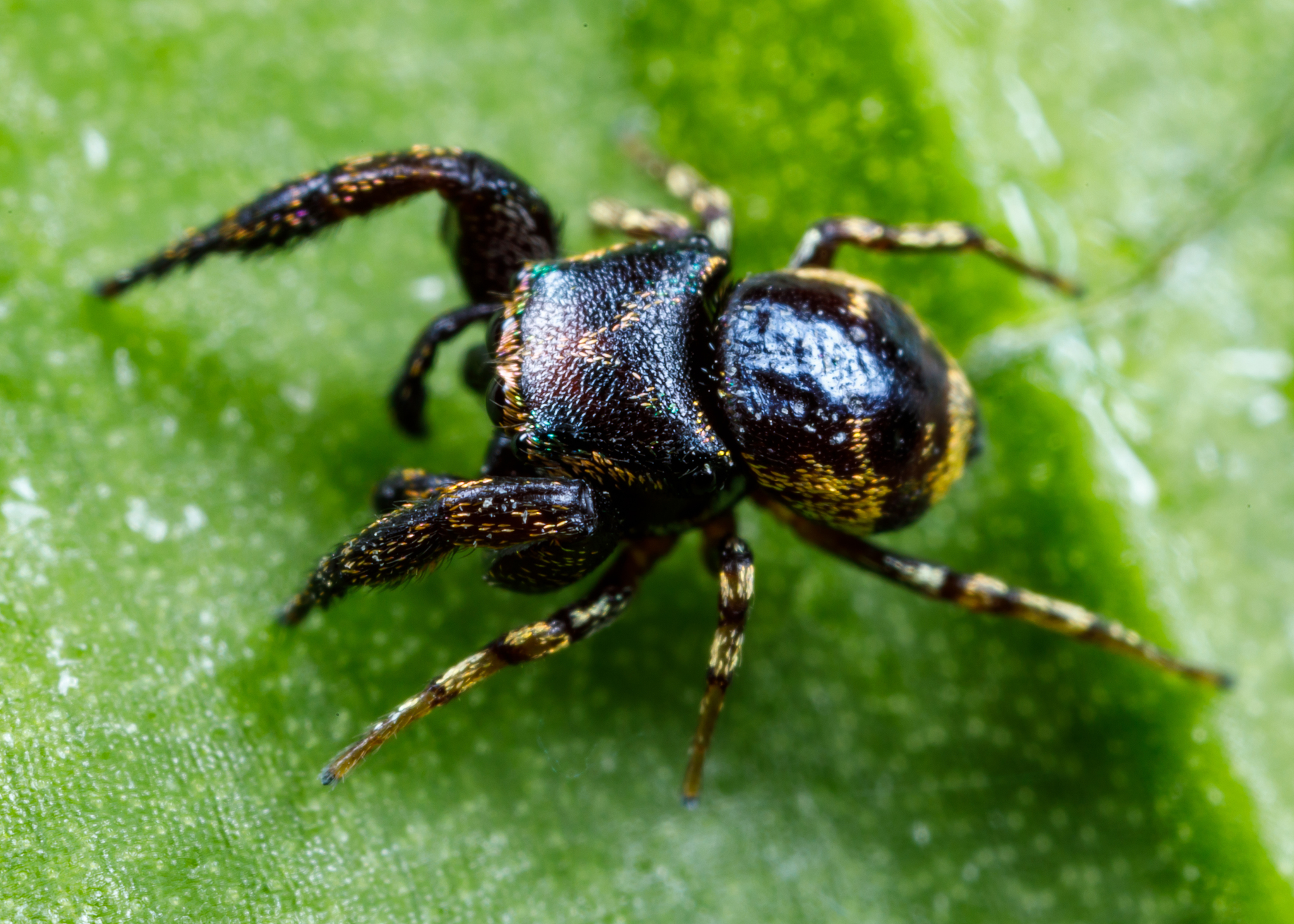
- Male

Scientific classification
- Kingdom: Animalia
- Phylum: Arthropoda
- Subphylum: Chelicerata
- Class: Arachnida
- Order: Araneae
- Infraorder: Araneomorphae
- Family: Salticidae
- Genus: Rhetenor
- Species: R. texanus

Binomial name
- Rhetenor texanus Gertsch, 1936

= Rhetenor texanus =

Species of spider

Rhetenor texanus is a species of jumping spider. It has been found in Texas and Mexico.
