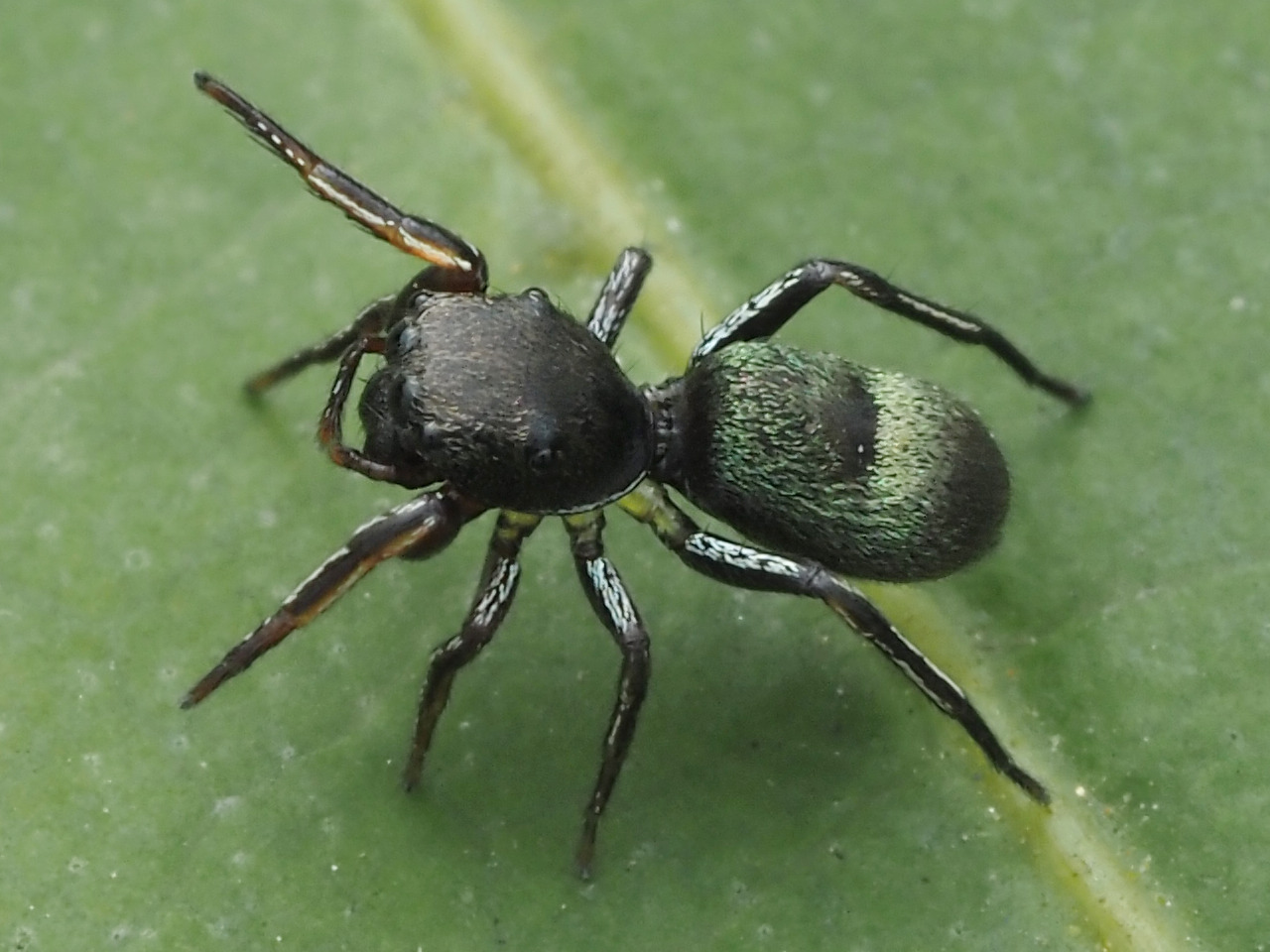
- Female Paradamoetas sp. in Belize

Scientific classification
- Kingdom: Animalia
- Phylum: Arthropoda
- Subphylum: Chelicerata
- Class: Arachnida
- Order: Araneae
- Infraorder: Araneomorphae
- Family: Salticidae
- Subfamily: Salticinae
- Genus: Paradamoetas; Peckham & Peckham, 1885

Type species
- P. formicinus Peckham & Peckham, 1885

Species
- 4, see text

= Paradamoetas =

Genus of spiders

Paradamoetas is a genus of jumping spiders that was first described by George and Elizabeth Peckham in 1885. The name is a combination of the Ancient Greek "para" (παρά), meaning "alongside", and the salticid genus Damoetas.

== Species ==
As of June 2023 it contains four species, found in Canada, the United States, Mexico and across parts of Central America:

- Paradamoetas carus (Peckham & Peckham, 1892) – Mexico, Guatemala, Honduras and El Salvador
- Paradamoetas changuinola Cutler, 1982 – Panama
- Paradamoetas fontanus (Levi, 1951) – US, Canada
- Paradamoetas formicinus Peckham & Peckham, 1885 (type) – US, Mexico, Guatemala to Nicaragua
