= Xuriella marmorea =

Scientific classification
- Kingdom: Animalia
- Phylum: Arthropoda
- Subphylum: Chelicerata
- Class: Arachnida
- Order: Araneae
- Infraorder: Araneomorphae
- Family: Salticidae
- Genus: Xuriella
- Species: X. marmorea

Binomial name
- Xuriella marmorea Wesołowska & van Harten, 2007

Species of jumping spider

Xuriella marmorea is a jumping spider species that is endemic to Yemen. A member of the genus Xuriella, it is a small spider with a total body length between 3 and 4 mm (0.12 and 0.16 in). It can be distinguished from related spiders by the distinctive mottled brown pattern on its otherwise yellow abdomen, which is recalled in the spider's specific name, which is based on a Latin word that can be translated 'mottled'. The female being generally slightly larger than the male and also has a clearer pattern. The spider is otherwise generally brown apart from black rings around the spider's eyes. It has a pair of greyish-brown front legs, its remaining legs being yellowish and brown. The female resembles spiders in the related genus Dendryphantes. It has a single pocket and a large shallow depression on its epigyne, the external visible part of its copulatory organs, and thick-walled spermathecae, or receptacles at the end of its short wide insemination ducts.

== Taxonomy and etymology ==
Xuriella marmorea is a species of jumping spider, a member of the family Salticidae, that was first described by the arachnologists Wanda Wesołowska and Antonius van Harten in 2007. They allocated the species to the genus Xuriella, first circumscribed by Wesołowska and Anthony Russell-Smith in 2007. It was one of over 500 species identified by Wesołowska during her career. Its generic name is an arbitrary collection of letters. Its specific name is based on a Latin word that can be translated 'mottled' due to the pattern on its abdomen.

The genus is similar to the genus Rhene, being distinguished by more rounded abdomen and generally flatter body. The female of the species also has similar copulatory organs to spiders of the genusDendryphantes. In 2015, evolutionary biologist Wayne Maddison noted the similarity of these three genera and placed them all in the subtribe Dendryphantina in the tribe Dendryphantini. He allocated the tribe to the subclade Simonida in the clade Saltafresia in the clade Salticoida as part of a wider phylogenetic classification. In 2017, Jerzy Prószyński designated Xuriella a member of a group of genera named Iciines after the genus Icius. The holotype is stored at the Royal Museum for Central Africa in Tervuren.

== Description ==
Xuriella marmorea is a small spider with distinctive characteristics. Its body is divided into two main parts: a forward section, known as its cephalothorax, and, behind that, an oval abdmoen. The male has a high carapace, the hard upper part of the cephalothorax, that is between 1.5 and 1.7 mm (0.06 and 0.07 in) long, between 1.4 and 1.6 mm (0.06 and 0.06 in) wide and between 0.6 and 0.8 mm (0.02 and 0.03 in) high. It is brown with a scattering of short brown hairs visible on its thorax. Its eye field is large and trapezoid with a layer of dense short greyish hairs towards the front of its eyes, all of which are surrounded by black rings. Its carapace is covered in very small pits. The underside of its cephalothorax, or sternum, is brown, as is the spider's face, or clypeus. Its mouthparts, including its chelicerae, labium and maxillae, are also brown; its maxillae are slightly lighter than the rest.

The male spider's abdomen is smaller than its carapace, measuring between 1.5 and 2 mm (0.06 and 0.08 in) in length and 1.5 and 1.8 mm (0.06 and 0.07 in) in width. It is wider than the spider's carapace, rounded with yellow upper surfaces that are covered in white scales and brown hairs and a mottled pattern of brown spots. It is this pattern that most easily distinguishes the spider from others in the genus. Underneath, there are two lines of light dots that cross a large dark patch in the middle of its abdomen. Its spinnerets, which the spider uses for spinning webs, are dark. Its front pair of legs are greyish-brown and light brown. Its remaining legs are thinner, yellowish and brown, with long brown leg hairs. There are a few spines on its legs.

At the end of the spider's pedipalps are its copulatory organs. Its palpal tibia is rounded with a very thin spike, or tibial apophysis, projecting upwards and curving round to point into the spider's cymbium. Its cymbium is tall and narrow that has a bulbous palpal bulb attached to it near the bottom that projects beyond the sides of its cymbium and has a long thin embolus curving out of the top. There is a meandering sperm duct inside the palpal bulb.

The female is similar to the male. Its carapace is similar in length but can be wider, up to 1.7 mm (0.07 in) in width, while its abdomen is longer, between 1.9 and 2.3 mm (0.07 and 0.09 in) in length, and wider, between 1.7 and 2.1 mm (0.07 and 0.08 in) in width. Its abdomen is more contrasting than the male's, with brown spots clearly visible against its yellowish-white background on the top.

The underside of its abdomen is darker than its topside. As well as the large dark spot, there are also three stripes that cross the underside. There are apodemes, ingrowths of the spider's exoskeleton, visible. The female's epigyne, the external visible part of its copulatory organs, features a single pocket and a large shallow depression. Its copulatory openings, which are plugged by a waxy secretion, lead via short wide insemination ducts to thick-walled spermathecae, or receptacles. Its accessory glands are distinctive and connect to its insemination ducts.

== Distribution ==
Xuriella spiders have been found across Africa, Asia and Europe. Endemic to Yemen, Xuriella marmorea has been found in Al-Mahwit, Dhamar, Hajjah and Sanaa Governorates. The holotype was caught in a Malaise trap.
