= Cerionesta =

Scientific classification
- Kingdom: Animalia
- Phylum: Arthropoda
- Subphylum: Chelicerata
- Class: Arachnida
- Order: Araneae
- Infraorder: Araneomorphae
- Family: Salticidae
- Subfamily: Salticinae
- Genus: Cerionesta; Simon, 1901

Type species
- C. luteola (Peckham & Peckham, 1894)

Species
- C. luteola (Peckham & Peckham, 1894) – St. Vincent; C. pacifica (Banks, 1902) – Ecuador (Galapagos Is.)

Genus of spiders

Cerionesta is a genus of jumping spiders that was first described by Eugène Louis Simon in 1901. As of June 2019 it contains only two species, found only on the Windward Islands and the Galápagos Islands: C. luteola and C. pacifica.
