= Pseudopartona =

Scientific classification
- Kingdom: Animalia
- Phylum: Arthropoda
- Subphylum: Chelicerata
- Class: Arachnida
- Order: Araneae
- Infraorder: Araneomorphae
- Family: Salticidae
- Genus: Pseudopartona
- Species: P. ornata

Binomial name
- Pseudopartona ornata Caporiacco, 1954

Genus of spiders

Pseudopartona is a genus of the jumping spiders only found in French Guiana. As of 2017, it contains only one species, Pseudopartona ornata.
