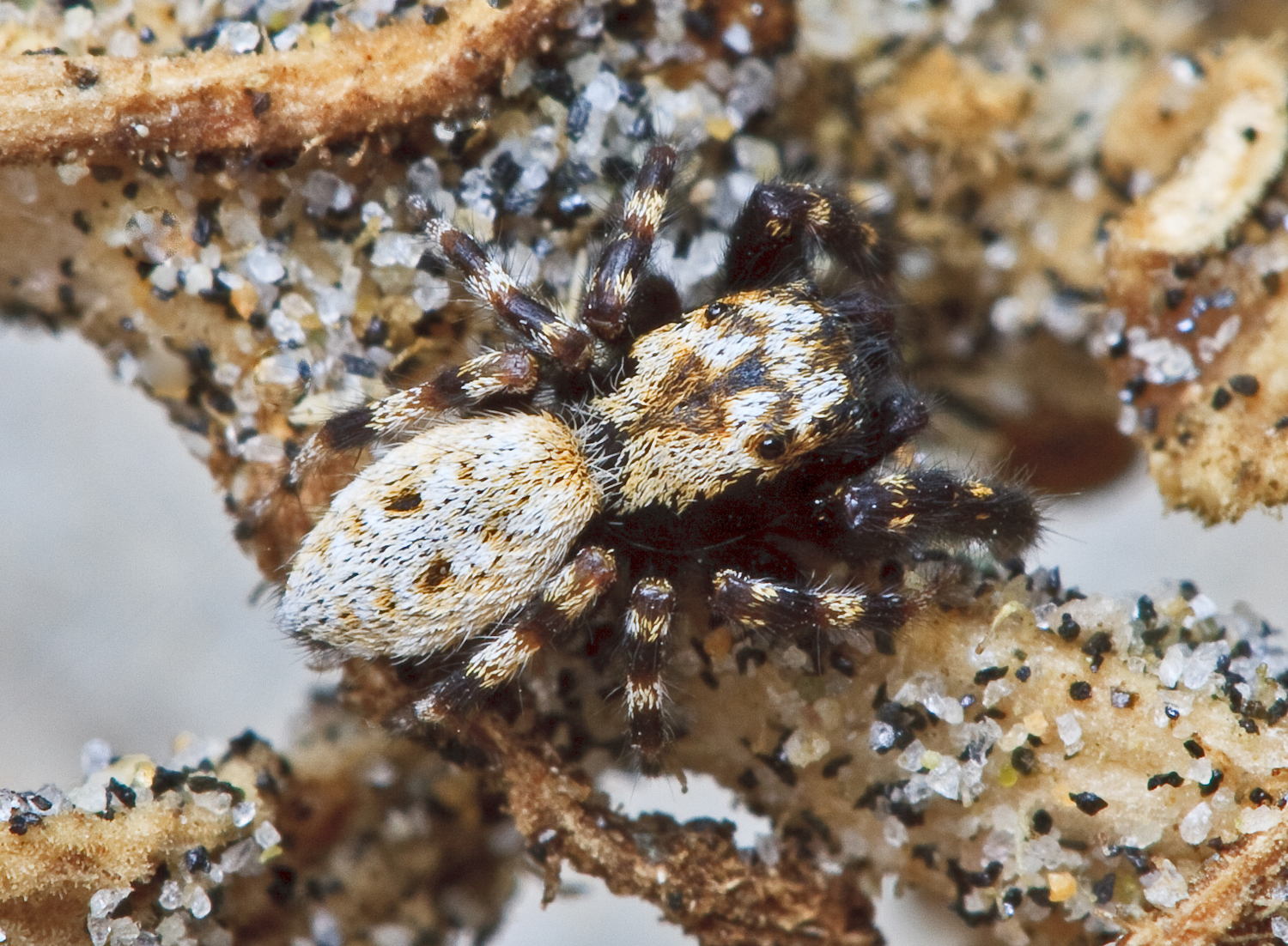
- Male Terralonus californicus

Scientific classification
- Kingdom: Animalia
- Phylum: Arthropoda
- Subphylum: Chelicerata
- Class: Arachnida
- Order: Araneae
- Infraorder: Araneomorphae
- Family: Salticidae
- Subfamily: Salticinae
- Genus: Terralonus; Maddison, 1996

Type species
- T. mylothrus (Chamberlin, 1925)

Species
- 7, see text

= Terralonus =

Genus of spiders

Terralonus is a genus of American jumping spiders that was first described by Wayne Paul Maddison in 1996.

== Species ==
As of August 2019 it contains seven species, found only in the United States:

- Terralonus banksi (Roewer, 1951) – USA
- Terralonus californicus (Peckham & Peckham, 1888) – USA
- Terralonus fraternus (Banks, 1932) – USA
- Terralonus mylothrus (Chamberlin, 1925) (type) – USA
- Terralonus shaferi (Gertsch & Riechert, 1976) – USA
- Terralonus unicus (Chamberlin & Gertsch, 1930) – USA
- Terralonus versicolor (Peckham & Peckham, 1909) – USA
