= Osericta =

Scientific classification
- Kingdom: Animalia
- Phylum: Arthropoda
- Subphylum: Chelicerata
- Class: Arachnida
- Order: Araneae
- Infraorder: Araneomorphae
- Family: Salticidae
- Subfamily: Salticinae
- Genus: Osericta; Simon, 1901

Type species
- O. dives Simon, 1901

Species
- O. cheliferoides (Taczanowski, 1878) – Peru; O. dives Simon, 1901 – Brazil

Genus of spiders

Osericta is a genus of South American jumping spiders that was first described by Eugène Louis Simon in 1901. As of August 2019 it contains only two species, found only in Brazil and Peru: O. cheliferoides and O. dives.
