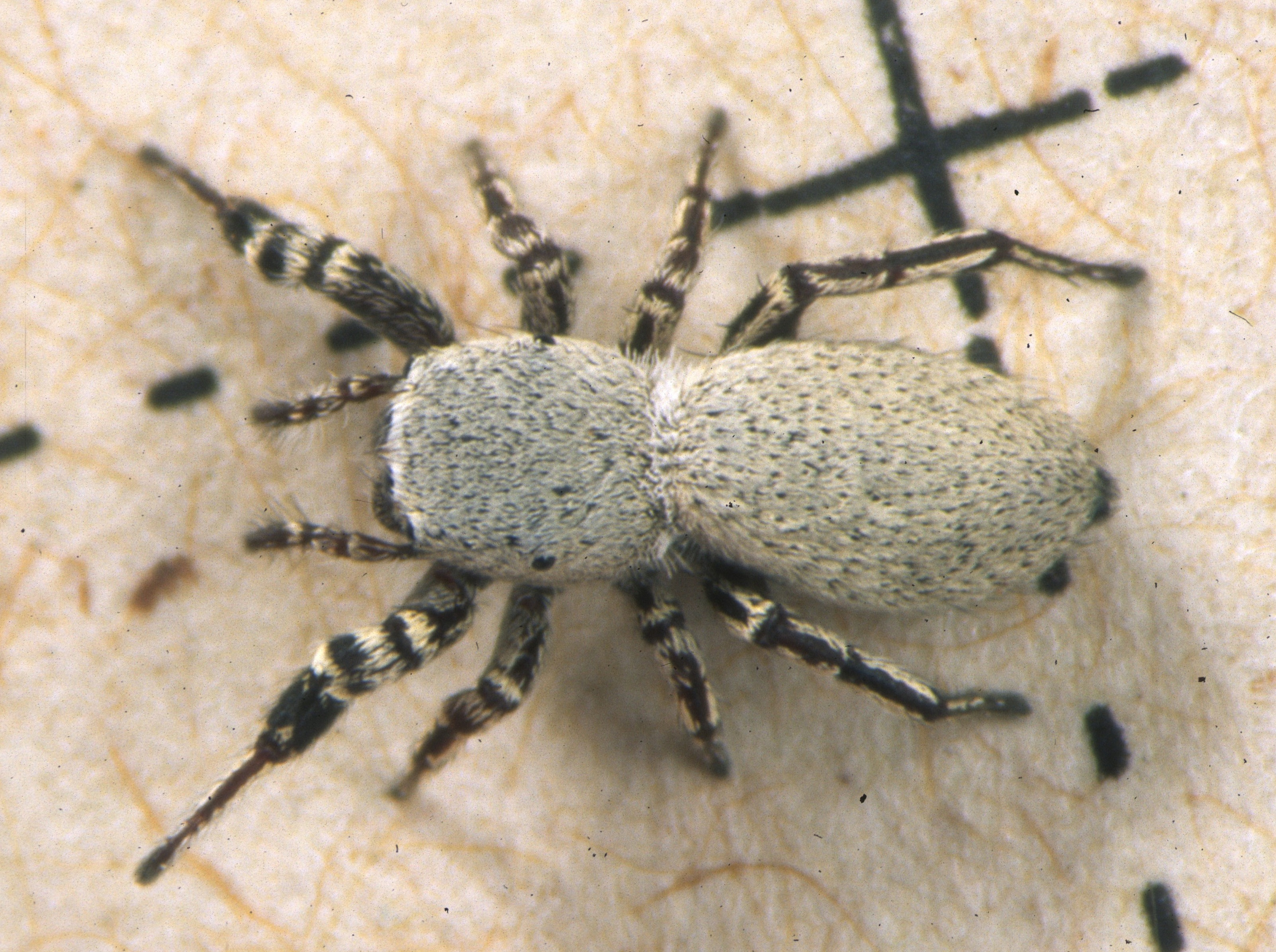
- Female Poultonella in Zapata County, Texas

Scientific classification
- Kingdom: Animalia
- Phylum: Arthropoda
- Subphylum: Chelicerata
- Class: Arachnida
- Order: Araneae
- Infraorder: Araneomorphae
- Family: Salticidae
- Subfamily: Salticinae
- Genus: Poultonella; Peckham & Peckham, 1909

Type species
- P. alboimmaculata (Peckham & Peckham, 1883)

Species
- P. alboimmaculata (Peckham & Peckham, 1883) – USA; P. nuecesensis Cokendolpher & Horner, 1978 – USA

= Poultonella =

Genus of spiders

Poultonella is a genus of American jumping spiders that was first described by George and Elizabeth Peckham in 1909. As of August 2019 it contains only two species, found only in the United States: P. alboimmaculata and P. nuecesensis. It is named in honor of Edward Bagnall Poulton.

== Description ==
These spiders have a low cephalothorax that is contracted in front and behind, and is widest near the dorsal eyes. The area near the head is slightly inclined, while the opposite end falls slightly, then all at once. The sides of the body are nearly vertical. Their eyes are four times as long as they are wide, and easily wider behind than in front.

The front eyes are small, and arranged in a slightly curved row. The middle eyes are almost twice as big as the ones behind them. The second row of eyes are much smaller and closer to the first row than the third. The third row of eyes is almost as wide as the entire body. The labium is longer than it is wide, and the sternum is twice as long as wide. The first coxae are separated by nearly the width of the labium. There are two spines on the tibia of the first leg, one just below and one on the end. The tibiae of the second legs are unarmed.
