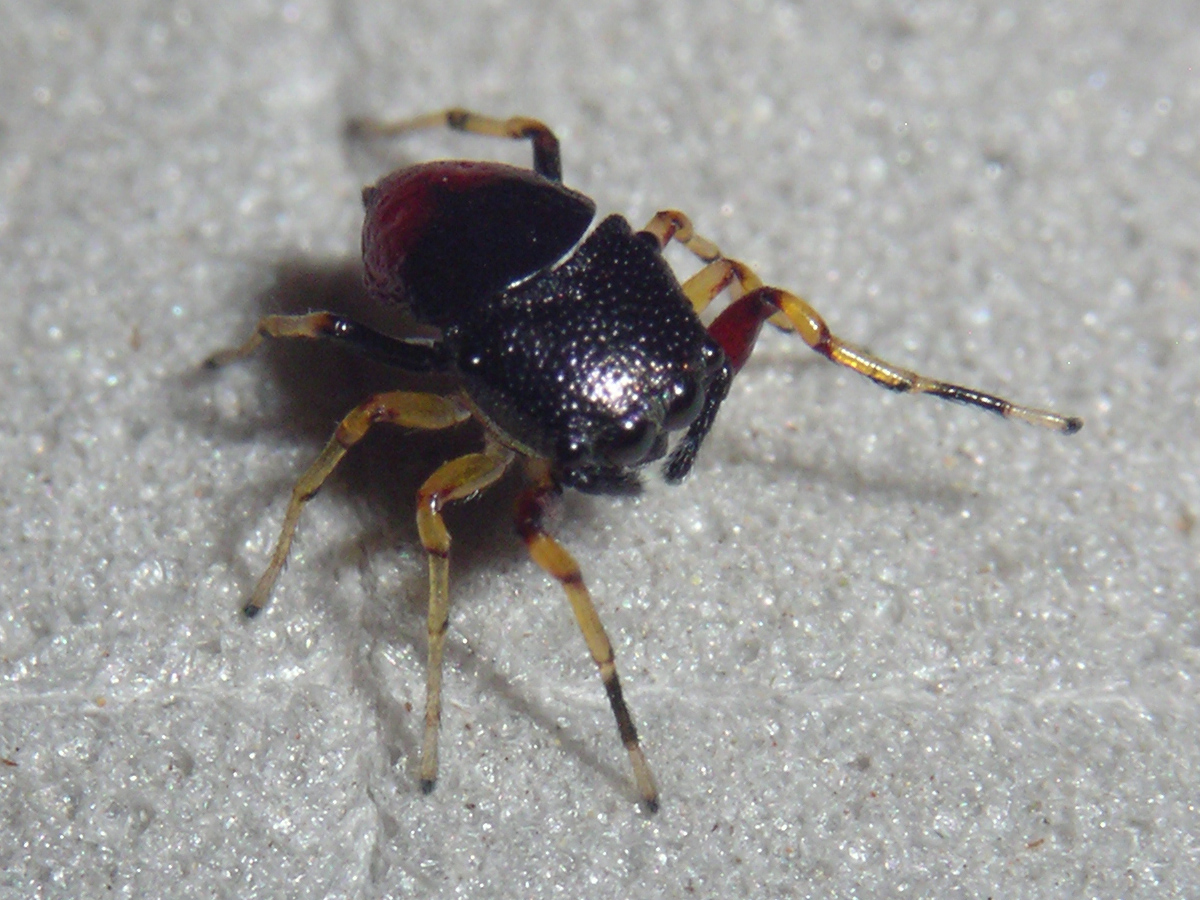
- Female Rhetenor in Ecuador

Scientific classification
- Kingdom: Animalia
- Phylum: Arthropoda
- Subphylum: Chelicerata
- Class: Arachnida
- Order: Araneae
- Infraorder: Araneomorphae
- Family: Salticidae
- Subfamily: Salticinae
- Genus: Rhetenor; Simon, 1902

Type species
- R. diversipes Simon, 1902

Species
- R. diversipes Simon, 1902 – Brazil; R. texanus Gertsch, 1936 – USA

= Rhetenor =

Genus of spiders

Rhetenor is a genus of beetle mimicking jumping spiders that was first described by Eugène Louis Simon in 1902. As of August 2019 it contains only two species, found only in the United States and Brazil: R. diversipes and R. texanus. The name is a reference to Rhetnor, a character in Ovid's Metamorphoses.
