= Sebastira =

Scientific classification
- Kingdom: Animalia
- Phylum: Arthropoda
- Subphylum: Chelicerata
- Class: Arachnida
- Order: Araneae
- Infraorder: Araneomorphae
- Family: Salticidae
- Subfamily: Salticinae
- Genus: Sebastira; Simon, 1901

Type species
- S. instrata Simon, 1901

Species
- S. instrata Simon, 1901 – Venezuela; S. plana Chickering, 1946 – Panama

Genus of spiders

Sebastira is a genus of jumping spiders that was first described by Eugène Louis Simon in 1901. As of August 2019 it contains only two species, found only in Panama and Venezuela: S. instrata and S. plana.
