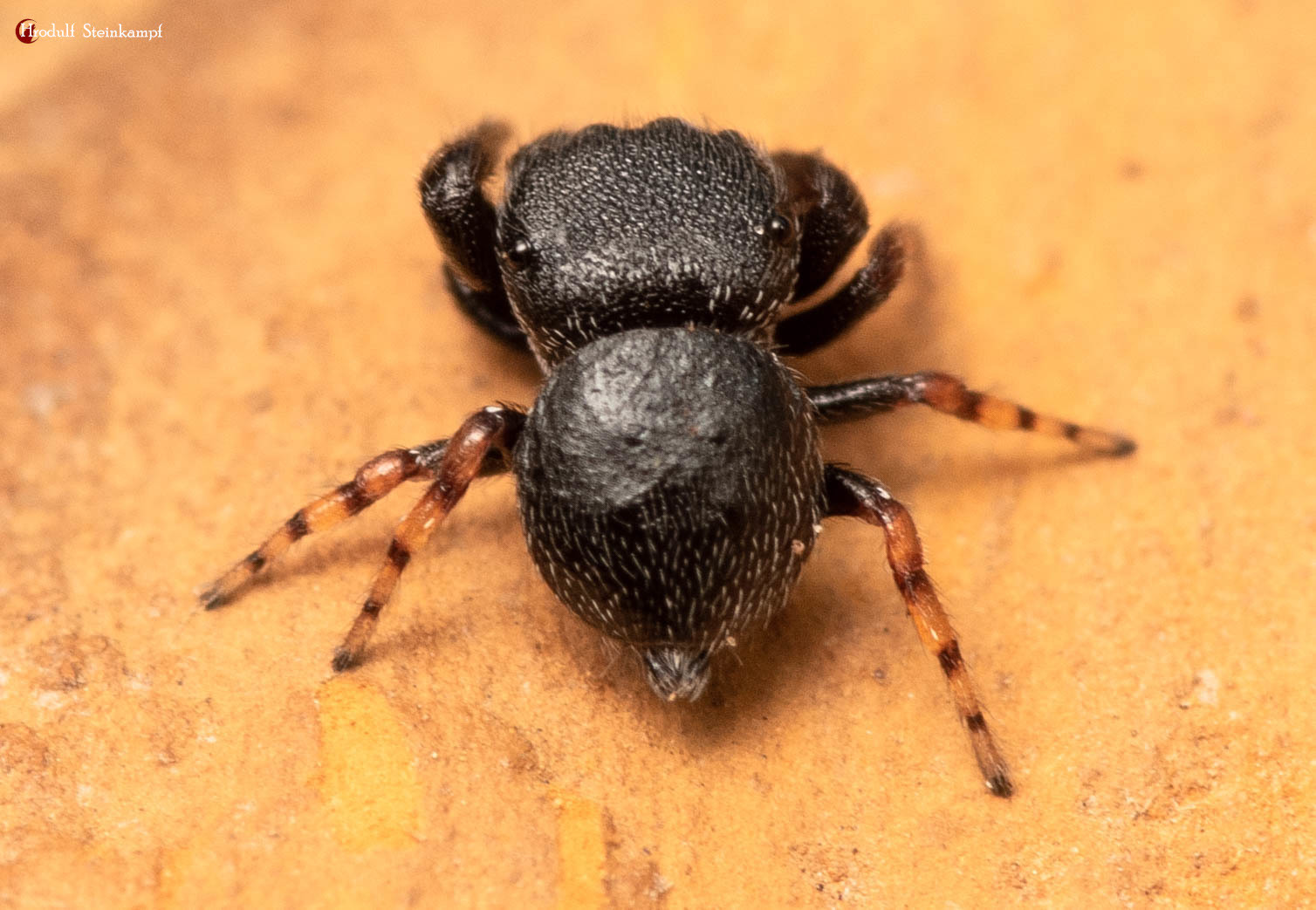
- male X. prima
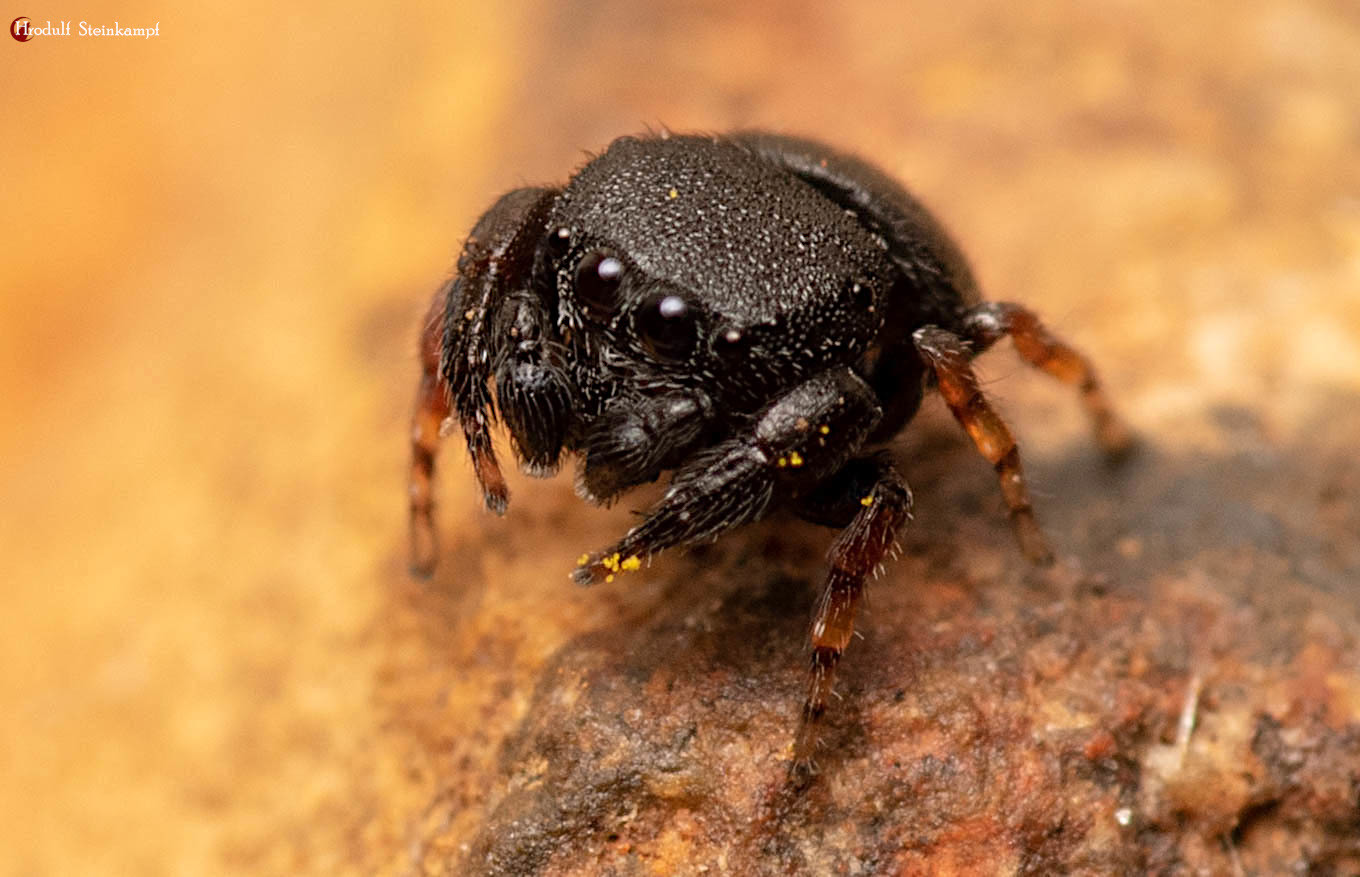
- male X. prima

Scientific classification
- Kingdom: Animalia
- Phylum: Arthropoda
- Subphylum: Chelicerata
- Class: Arachnida
- Order: Araneae
- Infraorder: Araneomorphae
- Family: Salticidae
- Subfamily: Salticinae
- Genus: Xuriella; Wesolowska & Russell-Smith, 2000

Type species
- Xuriella prima Wesolowska & Russell-Smith, 2000

Species
- See text.

= Xuriella =

Genus of spiders

Xuriella is a genus of spiders in the jumping spider family, Salticidae with two described species.

The female of Heliophanus pygmaeus was incorrectly associated with the male of X. prima. Both species are beetle-like in appearance. Beetle mimicry is rather common in spiders (including salticids), and has probably developed independently several times.

== Species ==
As of October 2025, this genus includes two species:

- Xuriella marmorea Wesołowska & van Harten, 2007 – Yemen
- Xuriella prima Wesołowska & Russell-Smith, 2000 – Tanzania, Zimbabwe, South Africa (type species)
