= Fritzia =

Scientific classification
- Kingdom: Animalia
- Phylum: Arthropoda
- Subphylum: Chelicerata
- Class: Arachnida
- Order: Araneae
- Infraorder: Araneomorphae
- Family: Salticidae
- Genus: Fritzia; O. Pickard-Cambridge, 1879
- Species: F. muelleri

Binomial name
- Fritzia muelleri O. Pickard-Cambridge, 1879

Genus of spiders

Fritzia is a monotypic genus of South American jumping spiders containing the single species, Fritzia muelleri. It was first described by Octavius Pickard-Cambridge in 1879, and is only found in Argentina and Brazil.
