= Damoetas =

Scientific classification
- Kingdom: Animalia
- Phylum: Arthropoda
- Subphylum: Chelicerata
- Class: Arachnida
- Order: Araneae
- Infraorder: Araneomorphae
- Family: Salticidae
- Genus: Damoetas; Peckham & Peckham, 1886
- Species: D. nitidus

Binomial name
- Damoetas nitidus (L. Koch, 1880)

Genus of spiders

Damoetas is a monotypic genus of Australian jumping spiders containing the single species Damoetas nitidus. It was first described by George and Elizabeth Peckham in 1886, and is only found in New South Wales and Queensland. Two species that were once in this family, Damoetas christae and Damoetas galianoae have since been moved to Hermosa.
