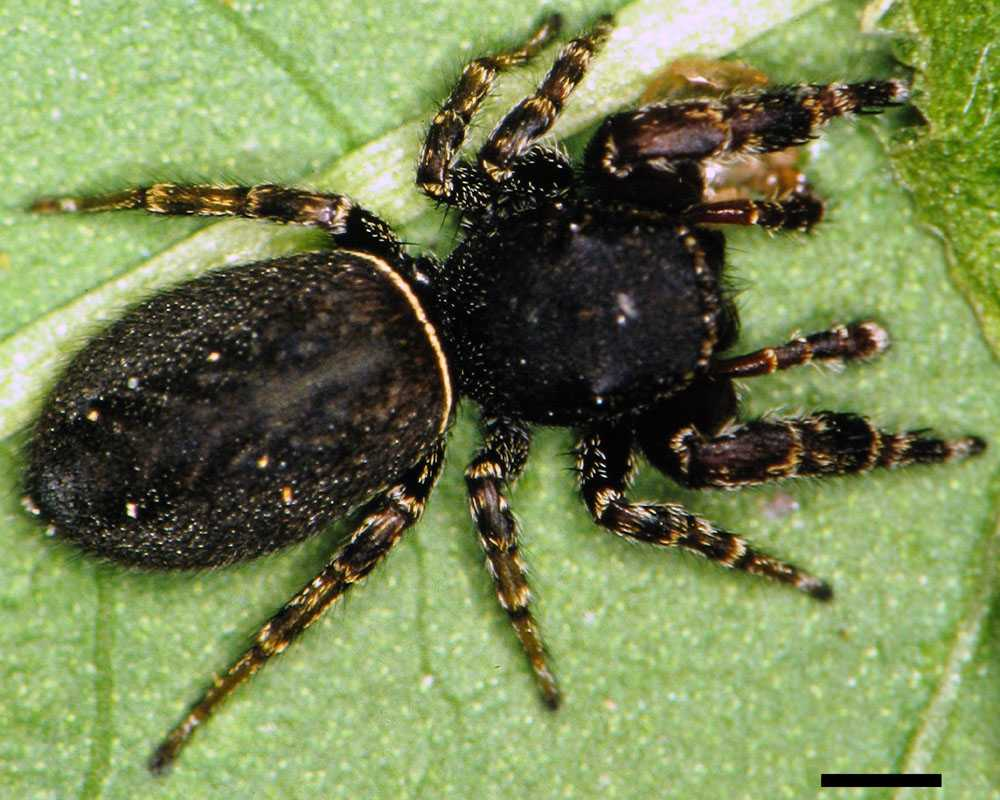
- Female Ghelna castanea

Scientific classification
- Kingdom: Animalia
- Phylum: Arthropoda
- Subphylum: Chelicerata
- Class: Arachnida
- Order: Araneae
- Infraorder: Araneomorphae
- Family: Salticidae
- Subfamily: Salticinae
- Genus: Ghelna; Maddison, 1996

Type species
- G. castanea (Hentz, 1846)

Species
- 4, see text

= Ghelna =

Genus of spiders

Ghelna is a genus of North American jumping spiders that was first described by Wayne Paul Maddison in 1996.

== Species ==
As of June 2019 it contains four species, found only in Canada and the United States:

- Ghelna barrowsi (Kaston, 1973) – USA
- Ghelna canadensis (Banks, 1897) – USA, Canada
- Ghelna castanea (Hentz, 1846) (type) – USA
- Ghelna sexmaculata (Banks, 1895) – USA, Canada
