= Selimus =

Scientific classification
- Kingdom: Animalia
- Phylum: Arthropoda
- Subphylum: Chelicerata
- Class: Arachnida
- Order: Araneae
- Infraorder: Araneomorphae
- Family: Salticidae
- Genus: Selimus; Peckham & Peckham, 1901
- Species: S. venustus

Binomial name
- Selimus venustus Peckham & Peckham, 1901

Genus of spiders

Selimus is a monotypic genus of Brazilian jumping spiders containing the single species, Selimus venustus. It was first described by George and Elizabeth Peckham in 1901, known from a single male found in Brazil. The species name is derived from Latin venustus "charming".

In 2006 Michael Saaristo erroneously erected a genus of the same name in the family Theridiidae for the species Anelosimus placens.
