= Chirothecia =

Scientific classification
- Kingdom: Animalia
- Phylum: Arthropoda
- Subphylum: Chelicerata
- Class: Arachnida
- Order: Araneae
- Infraorder: Araneomorphae
- Family: Salticidae
- Subfamily: Salticinae
- Genus: Chirothecia; Taczanowski, 1878

Type species
- C. clavimana (Taczanowski, 1871)

Species
- 13, see text

Synonyms
- Partona Simon, 1901

Genus of spiders

Chirothecia is a genus of jumping spiders that was first described by Władysław Taczanowski in 1878. Chirothecia is very similar to Bellota, but can be distinguished by the following characteristics: a much wider and taller cephalothorax (the width being 70–80% of the length and the height being 38–47% of the length); a much longer eye area (occupying 60–70% of the cephalothorax length); the posterior median eyes are always closer to the anterior lateral eyes than the posterior lateral eyes.

== Species ==
As of June 2019 it contains thirteen species, found only in South America and Panama:

- Chirothecia amazonica Simon, 1901 – Brazil
- Chirothecia botucatuensis Bauab, 1980 – Brazil
- Chirothecia clavimana (Taczanowski, 1871) (type) – Brazil, Guyana
- Chirothecia crassipes Taczanowski, 1878 – Peru
- Chirothecia daguerrei Galiano, 1972 – Argentina
- Chirothecia euchira (Simon, 1901) – Brazil, Argentina
- Chirothecia minima Mello-Leitão, 1943 – Argentina
- Chirothecia rosea (F. O. Pickard-Cambridge, 1901) – Panama
- Chirothecia semiornata Simon, 1901 – Brazil
- Chirothecia soaresi Bauab, 1980 – Brazil
- Chirothecia soesilae Makhan, 2006 – Suriname
- Chirothecia uncata Soares & Camargo, 1948 – Brazil
- Chirothecia wrzesniowskii Taczanowski, 1878 – Ecuador
