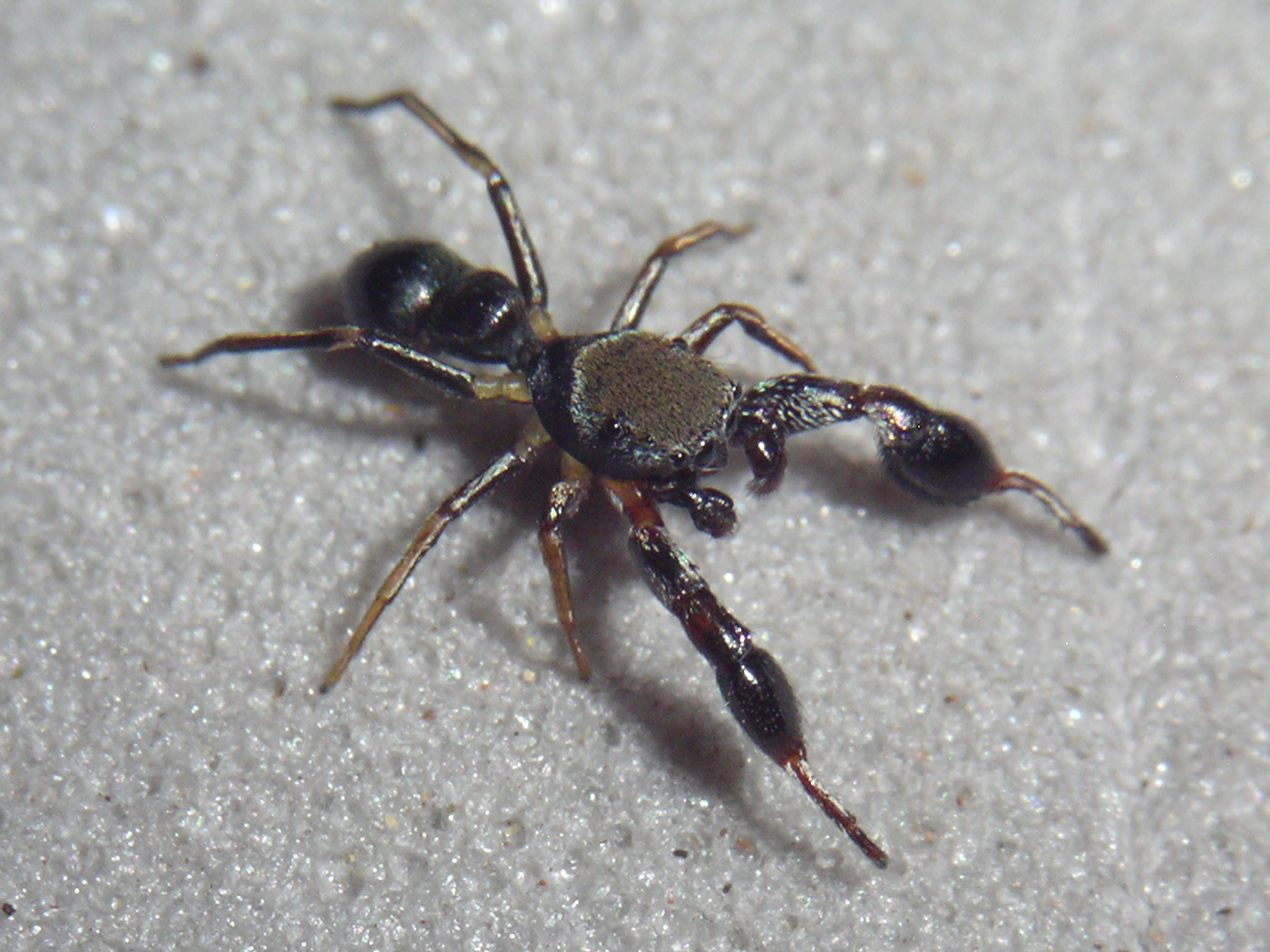
- Male of a Bellota species

Scientific classification
- Kingdom: Animalia
- Phylum: Arthropoda
- Subphylum: Chelicerata
- Class: Arachnida
- Order: Araneae
- Infraorder: Araneomorphae
- Family: Salticidae
- Subfamily: Salticinae
- Genus: Bellota; Peckham & Peckham, 1892

Type species
- B. peckhami Galiano, 1978

Species
- 9, see text

= Bellota =

Genus of spiders

Bellota is also a homonym of the plant genus Beilschmiedia.

Bellota is a genus of jumping spiders that was first described by George Peckham & Elizabeth Peckham in 1892. It is similar in appearance to the genus Chirothecia, but has a narrower cephalothorax and a shorter eye area. The type species was later designated as Bellota peckhami Galiano, 1978, from a male specimen previously misidentied by the Peckham's as Bellota formicina (Taczanowski, 1878), per Galiano, 1978.

== Distribution ==
Most species of Balmaceda are found in South America with one also in Central America (Panama), and two in North America (United States of America). Two others with a notably disjunct distribution in Pakistan described by Dyal, 1935 can be of questionable affinity.

== Species ==
As of January 2025 genus Balmaceda contains nine species:

- Bellota fascialis Dyal, 1935 – Pakistan
- Bellota formicina (Taczanowski, 1878) – Ecuador, Peru
- Bellota livida Dyal, 1935 – Pakistan
- Bellota micans Peckham & Peckham, 1909 – USA
- Bellota modesta (Chickering, 1946) – Panama
- Bellota peckhami Galiano, 1978 (type) – Venezuela
- Bellota violacea Galiano, 1972 – Brazil
- Bellota wheeleri Peckham & Peckham, 1909 – USA
- Bellota yacui Galiano, 1972 – Argentina
