= Semora =

Scientific classification
- Kingdom: Animalia
- Phylum: Arthropoda
- Subphylum: Chelicerata
- Class: Arachnida
- Order: Araneae
- Infraorder: Araneomorphae
- Family: Salticidae
- Subfamily: Salticinae
- Genus: Semora; Peckham & Peckham, 1892

Type species
- S. napaea Peckham & Peckham, 1892

Species
- 4, see text

Genus of spiders

Semora is a genus of South American jumping spiders that was first described by George and Elizabeth Peckham in 1892.

== Species ==
As of August 2019 it contains four species, found only in Venezuela, Brazil, and Argentina:

- Semora infranotata Mello-Leitão, 1945 – Argentina
- Semora langei Mello-Leitão, 1947 – Brazil
- Semora napaea Peckham & Peckham, 1892 (type) – Brazil
- Semora trochilus Simon, 1901 – Venezuela
