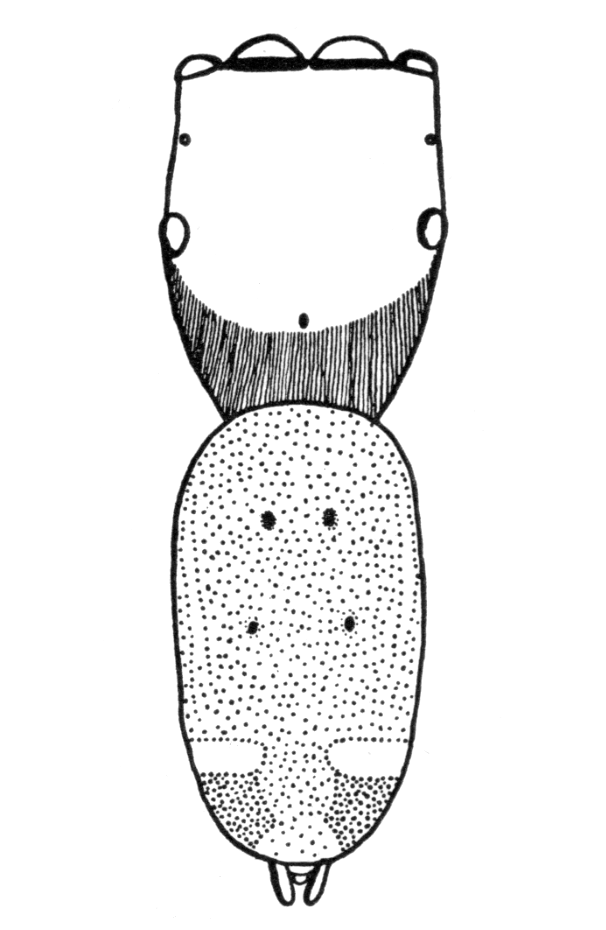
- Dorsal view of a female Donaldius lucidus

Scientific classification
- Kingdom: Animalia
- Phylum: Arthropoda
- Subphylum: Chelicerata
- Class: Arachnida
- Order: Araneae
- Infraorder: Araneomorphae
- Family: Salticidae
- Genus: Donaldius; Chickering, 1946
- Species: D. lucidus

Binomial name
- Donaldius lucidus Chickering, 1946

= Donaldius =

Genus of spiders

Donaldius is a monotypic genus of Panamanian jumping spiders containing the single species, Donaldius lucidus. It was first described by Arthur Merton Chickering in 1946, and is only found in Panama.
