= Tacuna =

Scientific classification
- Kingdom: Animalia
- Phylum: Arthropoda
- Subphylum: Chelicerata
- Class: Arachnida
- Order: Araneae
- Infraorder: Araneomorphae
- Family: Salticidae
- Subfamily: Salticinae
- Genus: Tacuna; Peckham & Peckham, 1901

Type species
- T. delecta Peckham & Peckham, 1901

Species
- 4, see text

Genus of spiders

Tacuna is a genus of South American jumping spiders that was first described by George and Elizabeth Peckham in 1901.

== Species ==
As of August 2019 it contains four species, found only in Argentina and Brazil:

- Tacuna delecta Peckham & Peckham, 1901 (type) – Brazil, Argentina
- Tacuna minensis Galiano, 1995 – Brazil
- Tacuna saltensis Galiano, 1995 – Argentina
- Tacuna vaga (Peckham & Peckham, 1895) – Brazil
