= Thammaca =

Scientific classification
- Kingdom: Animalia
- Phylum: Arthropoda
- Subphylum: Chelicerata
- Class: Arachnida
- Order: Araneae
- Infraorder: Araneomorphae
- Family: Salticidae
- Subfamily: Salticinae
- Genus: Thammaca; Simon, 1901

Type species
- T. coriacea Simon, 1901

Species
- T. coriacea Simon, 1901 – Brazil; T. nigritarsis Simon, 1902 – Peru, Brazil

Genus of spiders

Thammaca is a genus of South American jumping spiders that was first described by Eugène Louis Simon in 1901. As of August 2019 it contains only two species, found only in Peru and Brazil: T. coriacea and T. nigritarsis.
