= Mabellina =

Scientific classification
- Kingdom: Animalia
- Phylum: Arthropoda
- Subphylum: Chelicerata
- Class: Arachnida
- Order: Araneae
- Infraorder: Araneomorphae
- Family: Salticidae
- Genus: Mabellina
- Species: M. prescotti

Binomial name
- Mabellina prescotti Chickering, 1946

Genus of spiders

Mabellina is a genus of jumping spiders only found in Panama. It contains only one species, Mabellina prescotti.
