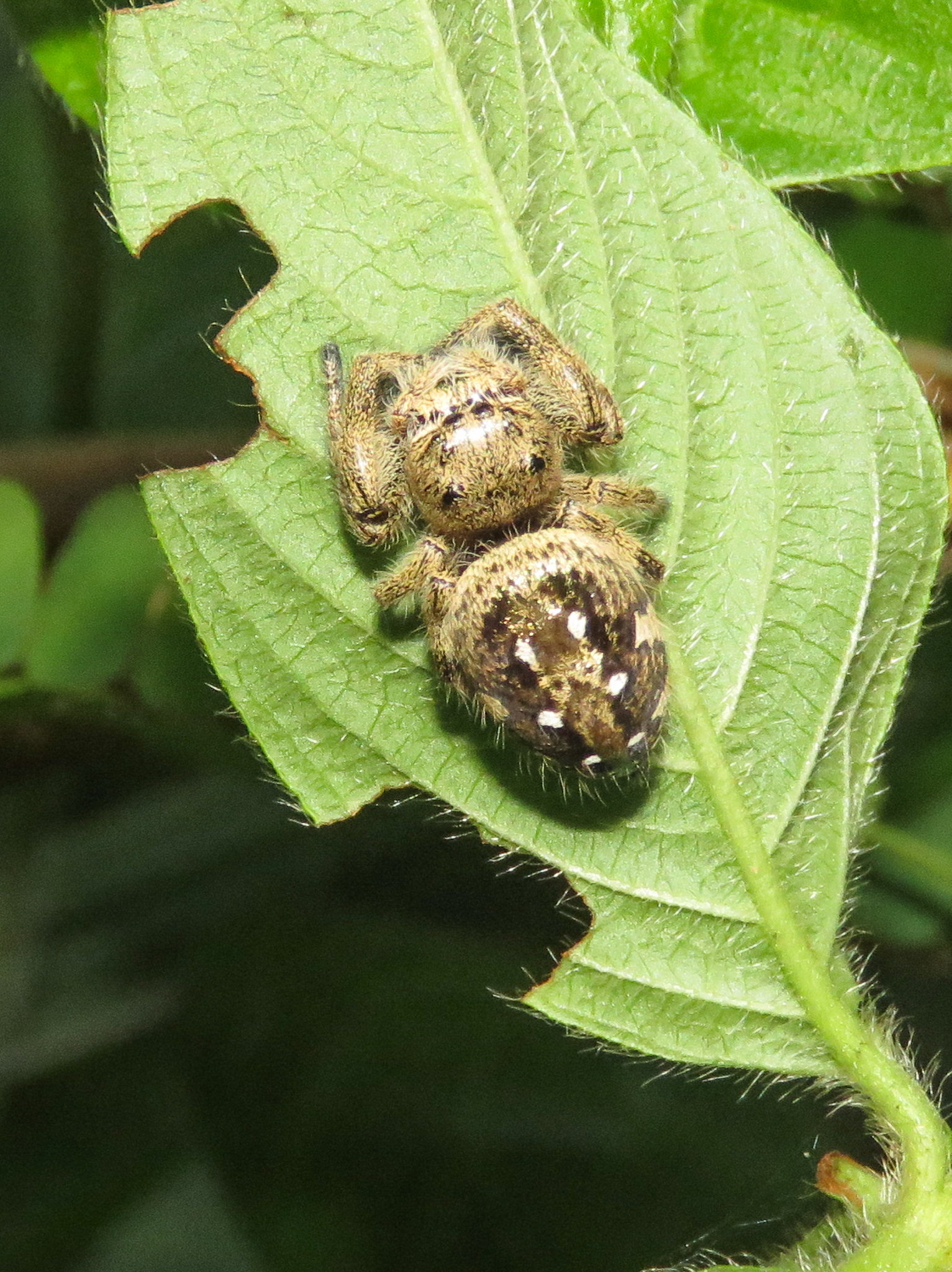
- Parnaenus cyanidens
- male P. metallicus

Scientific classification
- Kingdom: Animalia
- Phylum: Arthropoda
- Subphylum: Chelicerata
- Class: Arachnida
- Order: Araneae
- Infraorder: Araneomorphae
- Family: Salticidae
- Subfamily: Salticinae
- Genus: Parnaenus; Peckham & Peckham, 1896

Type species
- P. cyanidens (C. L. Koch, 1846)

Species
- P. cuspidatus F. O. Pickard-Cambridge, 1901 – Guatemala, El Salvador; P. cyanidens (C. L. Koch, 1846) – Guatemala to Peru, Bolivia, Brazil, Guyana; P. metallicus (C. L. Koch, 1846) – Brazil, Argentina

= Parnaenus =

Genus of spiders

Parnaenus is a genus of jumping spiders that was first described by George and Elizabeth Peckham in 1896. As of August 2019 it contains only three species, found only in South America, El Salvador, and Guatemala: P. cuspidatus, P. cyanidens, and P. metallicus.
