= Tuvaphantes =

Scientific classification
- Kingdom: Animalia
- Phylum: Arthropoda
- Subphylum: Chelicerata
- Class: Arachnida
- Order: Araneae
- Infraorder: Araneomorphae
- Family: Salticidae
- Subfamily: Salticinae
- Genus: Tuvaphantes; Logunov, 1993

Type species
- T. insolitus (Logunov, 1991)

Species
- T. arat Logunov, 1993 – Russia; T. insolitus (Logunov, 1991) – Russia

Genus of spiders

Tuvaphantes is a genus of Russian jumping spiders that was first described by D. V. Logunov in 1993. As of August 2019 it contains two species, endemic to Russia: T. arat and T. insolitus.
