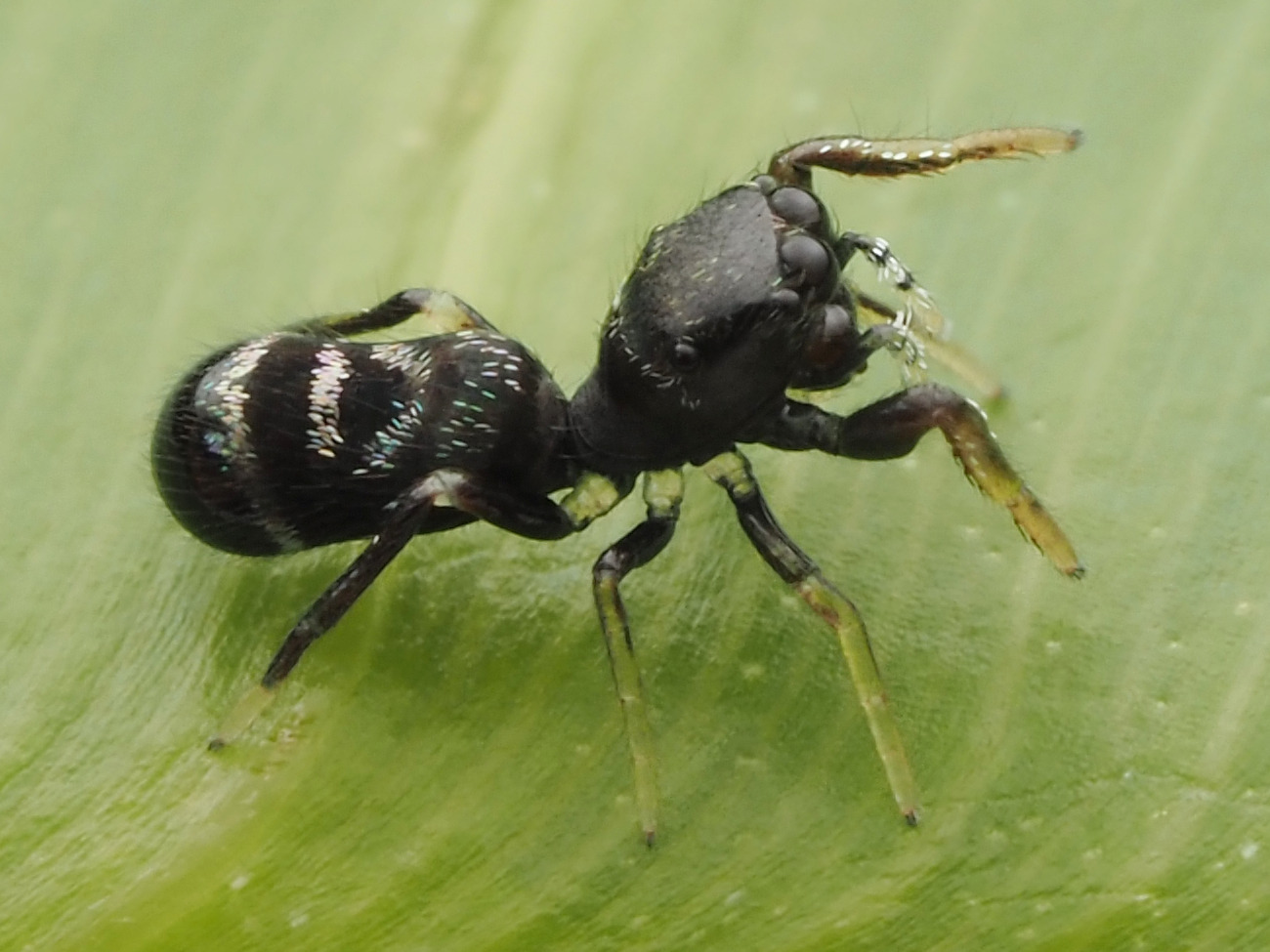

Scientific classification
- Kingdom: Animalia
- Phylum: Arthropoda
- Subphylum: Chelicerata
- Class: Arachnida
- Order: Araneae
- Infraorder: Araneomorphae
- Family: Salticidae
- Genus: Uluella; Chickering, 1946
- Species: U. formosa

Binomial name
- Uluella formosa Chickering, 1946

= Uluella =

Uluella formosa

Genus of spiders

Uluella is a monotypic genus of jumping spiders containing the single species, Uluella formosa. It was first described by Arthur M. Chickering in 1946, and is found in Panama and Ecuador. The spider is an iridescent ant mimic about 4 mm in length. It lives in association with bambusoid grasses of the tropical rainforests from which it constructs retreats made from rolled leaves.
