= Mburuvicha =

Scientific classification
- Kingdom: Animalia
- Phylum: Arthropoda
- Subphylum: Chelicerata
- Class: Arachnida
- Order: Araneae
- Infraorder: Araneomorphae
- Family: Salticidae
- Genus: Mburuvicha; Scioscia, 1993
- Species: M. galianoae

Binomial name
- Mburuvicha galianoae Scioscia, 1993

Genus of spiders

Mburuvicha is a monotypic genus of south american jumping spiders containing the single species, Mburuvicha galianoae. It was first described by C. L. Scioscia in 1993, and is found in Argentina, Brazil and Uruguay. The name is derived from the Guarani word Mburuvicha, meaning "chief". The species name honors arachnologist María Elena Galiano.
