= Tulpius =

Scientific classification
- Kingdom: Animalia
- Phylum: Arthropoda
- Subphylum: Chelicerata
- Class: Arachnida
- Order: Araneae
- Infraorder: Araneomorphae
- Family: Salticidae
- Subfamily: Salticinae
- Genus: Tulpius; Peckham & Peckham, 1896

Type species
- Tulpius hilarus Peckham & Peckham, 1896

Species
- See text.

Genus of spiders

Tulpius is a spider genus of the jumping spider family, Salticidae.

== Species ==
- Tulpius gauchus Bauab & Soares, 1983 — Brazil
- Tulpius hilarus Peckham & Peckham, 1896 — Guatemala
