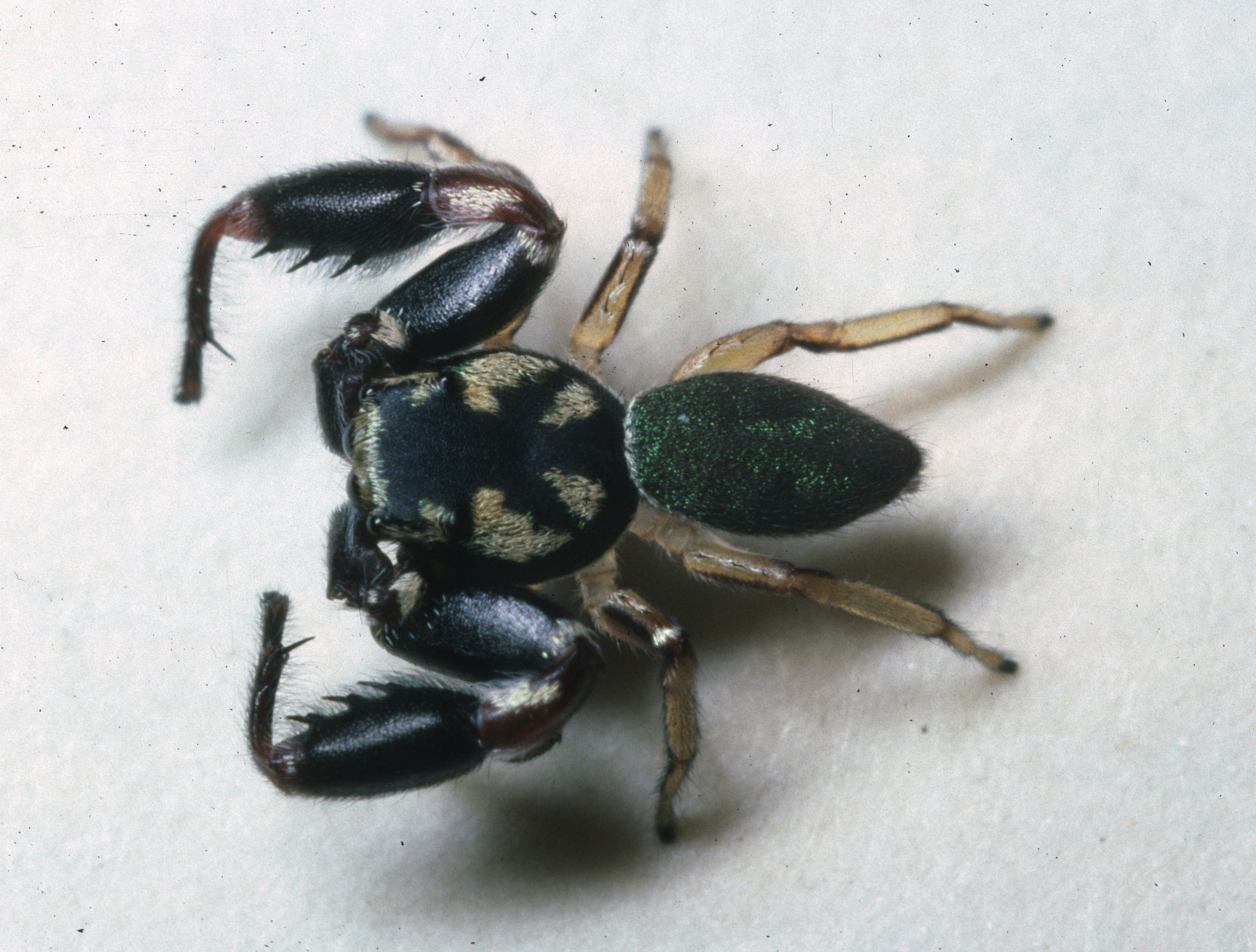
- Male Rudra sp. in Ecuador

Scientific classification
- Kingdom: Animalia
- Phylum: Arthropoda
- Subphylum: Chelicerata
- Class: Arachnida
- Order: Araneae
- Infraorder: Araneomorphae
- Family: Salticidae
- Subfamily: Salticinae
- Genus: Rudra; Peckham & Peckham, 1885

Type species
- R. geniculata Peckham & Peckham, 1885

Species
- 10, see text

Synonyms
- Anokopsis Bauab-Vianna & Soares, 1980

= Rudra (spider) =

Genus of spiders

Rudra is a genus of jumping spiders that was first described by George and Elizabeth Peckham in 1885. The name refers to Rudra, a Rigvedic god.

== Species ==
As of July 2023 it contains ten species, found in Central America, Brazil, Guyana, Argentina, and French Guiana:

- Rudra avitoides (Bauab-Vianna & Soares, 1980) – Brazil
- Rudra brescoviti Braul & Lise, 1999 – Brazil
- Rudra geniculata Peckham & Peckham, 1885 (type) – Guatemala, Panama
- Rudra humilis Mello-Leitão, 1945 – Argentina, Brazil
- Rudra minensis Galiano, 1984 – Brazil
- Rudra multispina Caporiacco, 1947 – Guyana
- Rudra oriximina Galiano, 1984 – Brazil
- Rudra polita Peckham & Peckham, 1894 – Guatemala
- Rudra tenera Peckham & Peckham, 1894 – Brazil
- Rudra wagae (Taczanowski, 1871) – French Guiana
