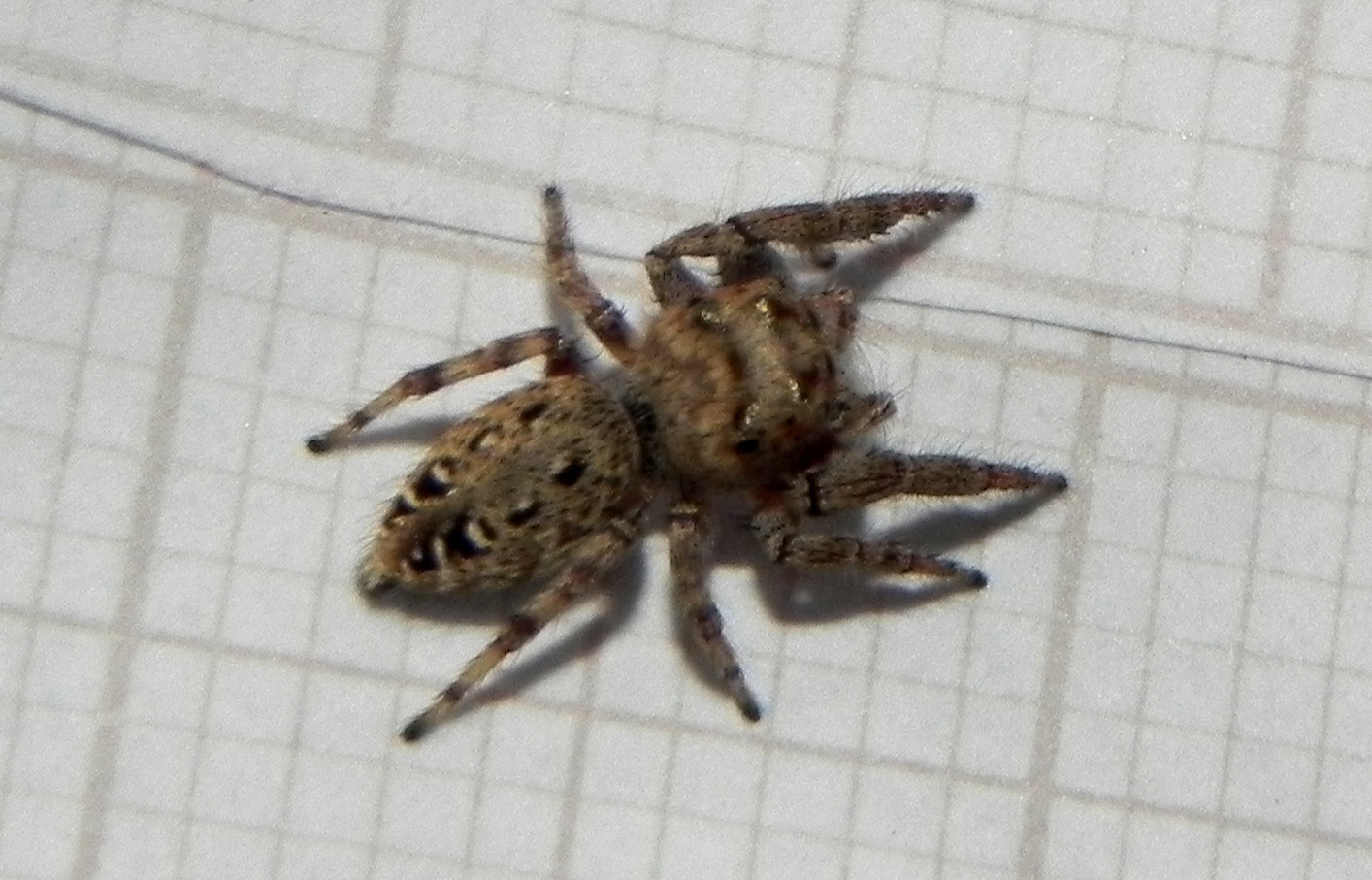
- female G. tesselata from Brazil

Scientific classification
- Kingdom: Animalia
- Phylum: Arthropoda
- Subphylum: Chelicerata
- Class: Arachnida
- Order: Araneae
- Infraorder: Araneomorphae
- Family: Salticidae
- Subfamily: Salticinae
- Genus: Gastromicans; Mello-Leitão, 1917

Type species
- G. albopilosa (Simon, 1903)

Species
- 7, see text

Synonyms
- Mirandia Badcock, 1932

= Gastromicans =

Genus of spiders

Gastromicans is a genus of jumping spiders that was first described by Cândido Firmino de Mello-Leitão in 1917.

== Etymology ==
The genus name Gastromicans is derived from the Greek gaster (Ancient Greek γᾰστήρ, belly, abdomen) and Latin micans (vibrating, twinkling, trembling), presumably referring to the distinctive iridescent scales found on the abdomen of these spiders, which Mello-Leitão described in detail in the original diagnosis.

== Description ==
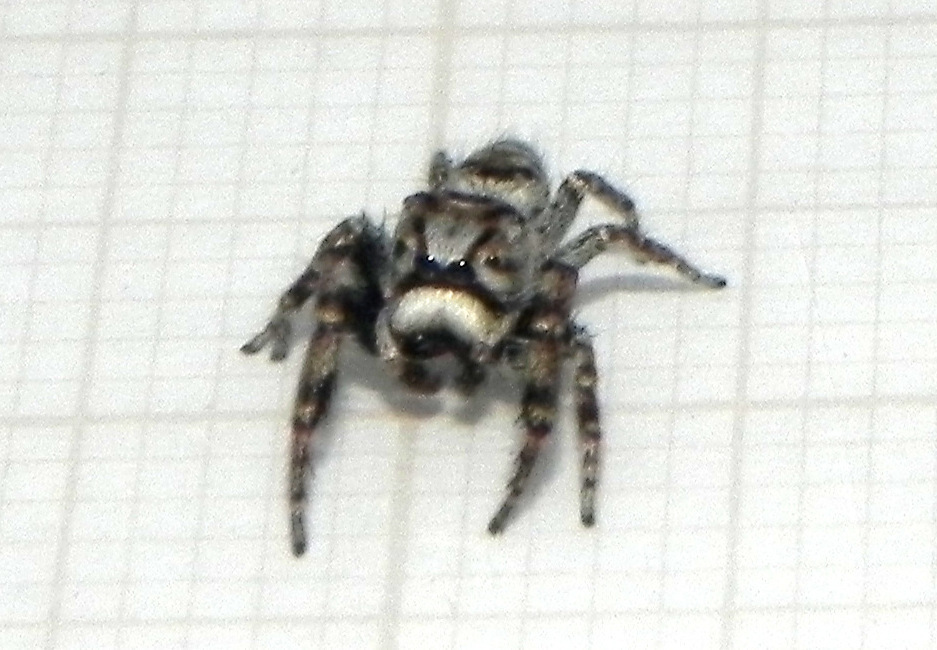
male G. tesselata

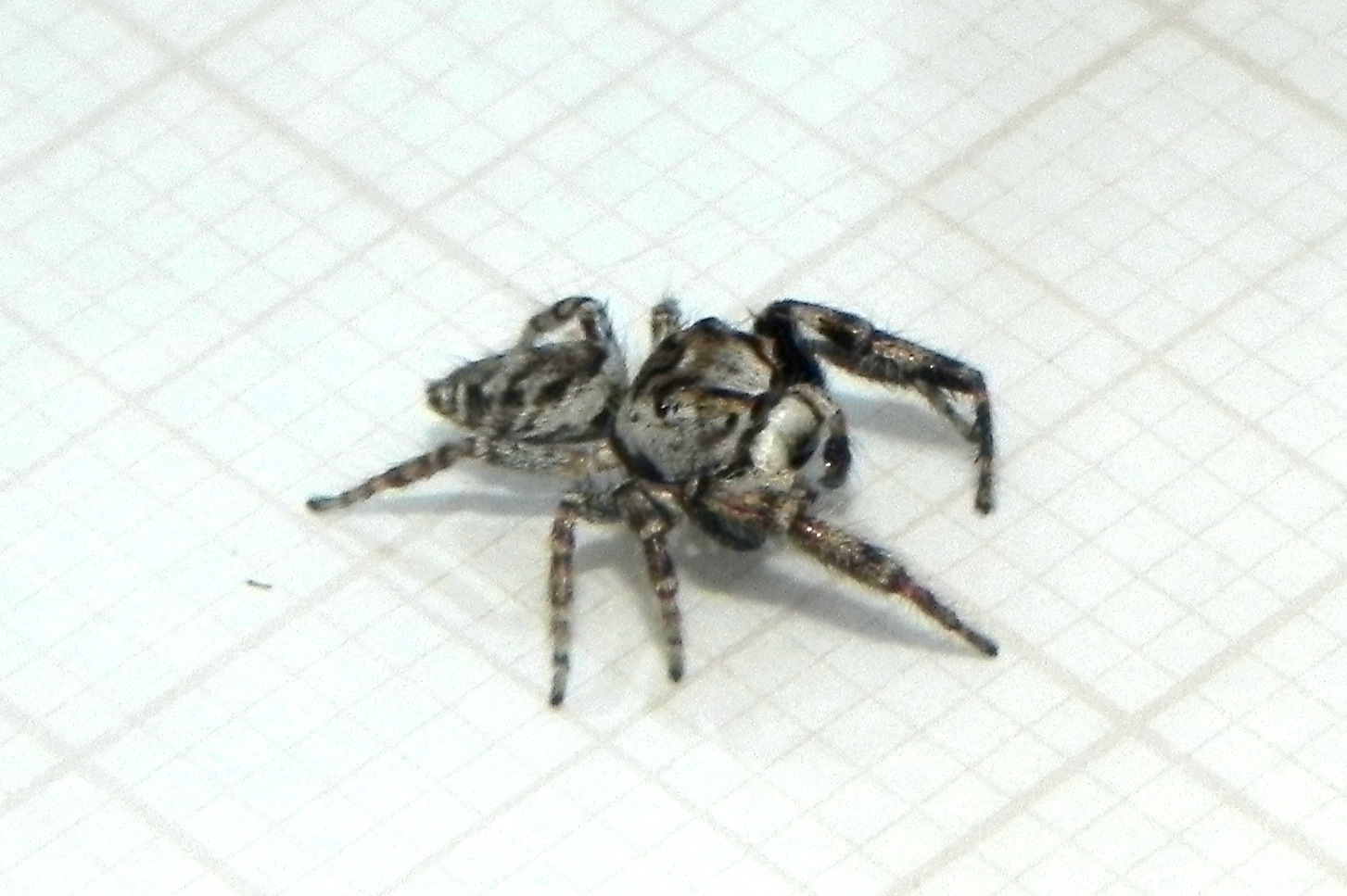
male G. tesselata

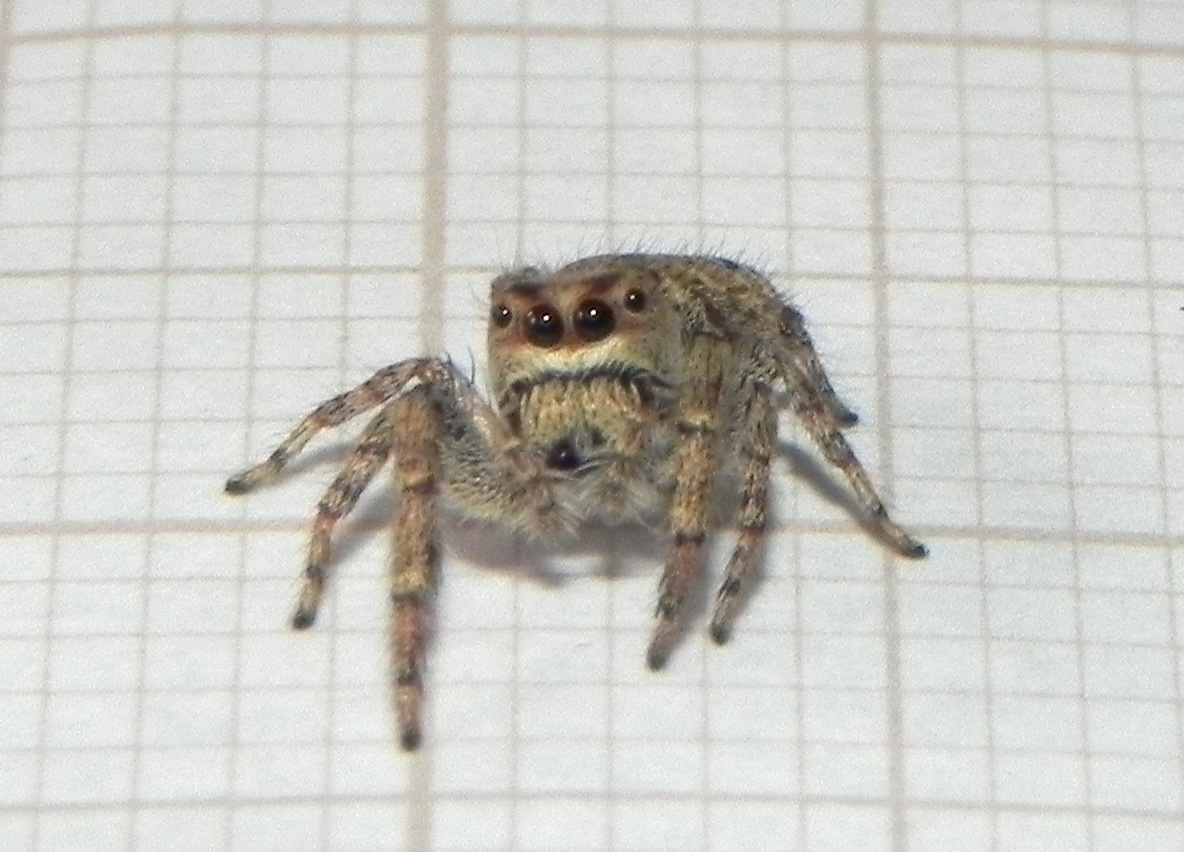
female G. tesselata

Members of Gastromicans are characterized by distinctive morphological features as described in Mello-Leitão's original diagnosis. The cephalothorax is elevated and broadly rounded on both sides, narrower posteriorly than anteriorly, with the cephalic region nearly flat and impressed between the eyes on both sides. The thoracic region is longer than the cephalic region.

The eye arrangement is typical of jumping spiders, with the posterior eyes being very prominent. The anterior eyes are arranged in a moderately recurved line, with the median eyes contiguous and narrowly separated from the lateral eyes.

The chelicerae are rugose (wrinkled) and show sexual dimorphism, with females having narrower and shorter chelicerae featuring a bidentate upper margin of the furrow. The front legs are longer and more robust than the others, with the anterior metatarsi bearing strong inferior spines arranged in a 2-2 pattern, and the anterior tibiae with inferior spines arranged 2-2-2.

A distinctive characteristic of the genus is the scaly integument covering the body, with the cephalothorax having a leathery (coriaceous) texture. This scaly covering is reflected in both the genus name and the original type species name squamulata, both referring to the scale-like structures.

== Taxonomy ==
Originally, Mello-Leitão established Gastromicans with G. squamulata as the type species. However, G. squamulata was later determined to be a junior synonym of G. albopilosa (Simon, 1903) by Galiano in 1980.

The genus was previously placed in synonymy under Beata but was removed from this synonymy and revalidated by Maddison in 1996. Recently, Gastromicans has been considered a senior synonym of Mirandia Badcock, 1932 by Sherwood, Nadal & Pett in 2023.

== Species ==
As of August 2025 this genus contains seven species, found in Central and South America:

G.albopilosa serves as the effective type species following the synonymization of G. squamulata.

- Gastromicans albopilosa (Simon, 1903) (type) – Brazil, Paraguay
- Gastromicans australis (Badcock, 1932) – Brazil, Argentina (transferred from Mirandia in 2023)
- Gastromicans hondurensis (Peckham & Peckham, 1896) – Guatemala, Honduras
- Gastromicans levispina (F. O. Pickard-Cambridge, 1901) – Panama, Colombia
- Gastromicans noxiosa (Simon, 1886) – Bolivia
- Gastromicans tesselata (C. L. Koch, 1846) – Brazil
- Gastromicans vigens (Peckham & Peckham, 1901) – Brazil, Argentina
