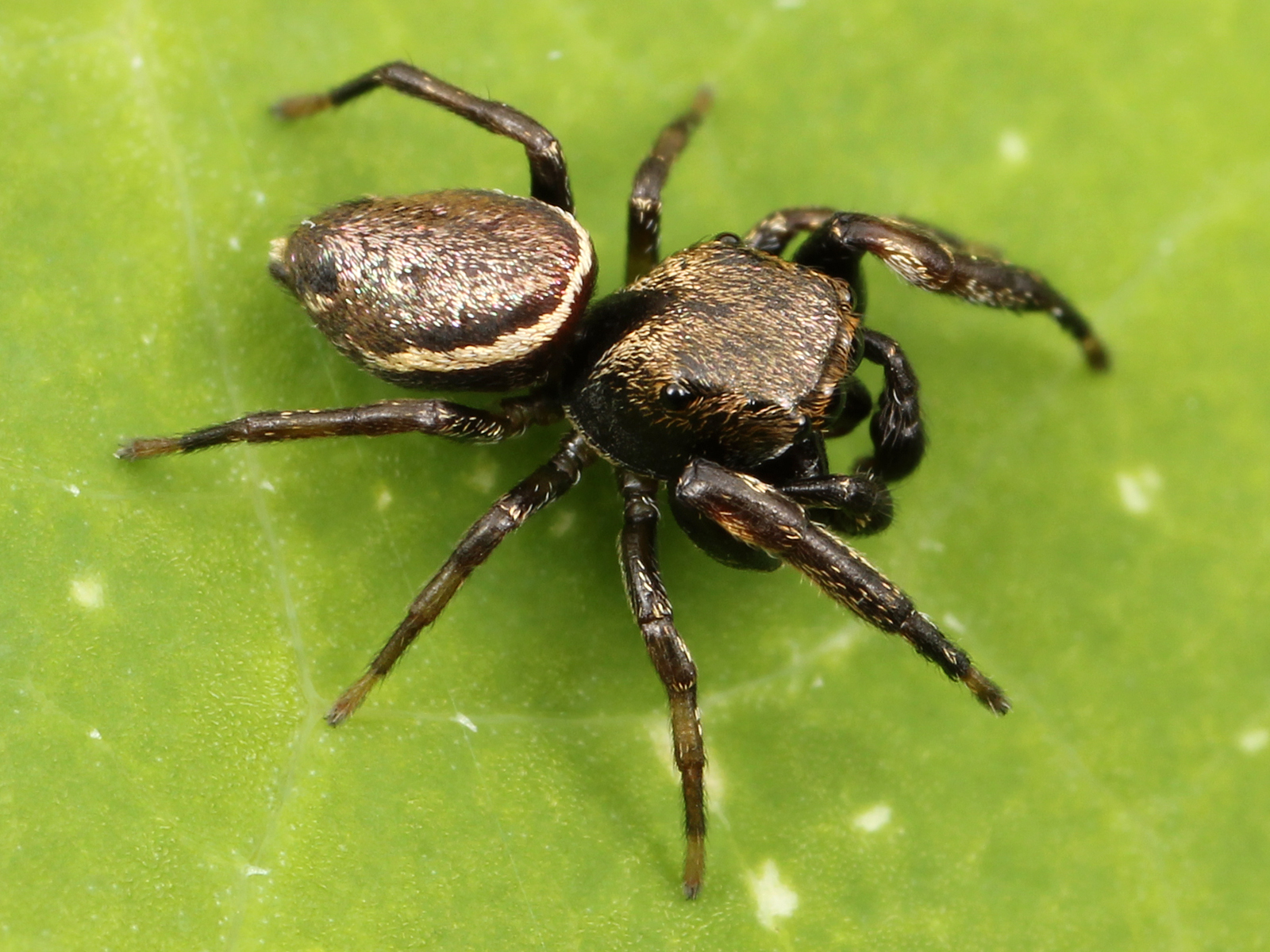
- Male
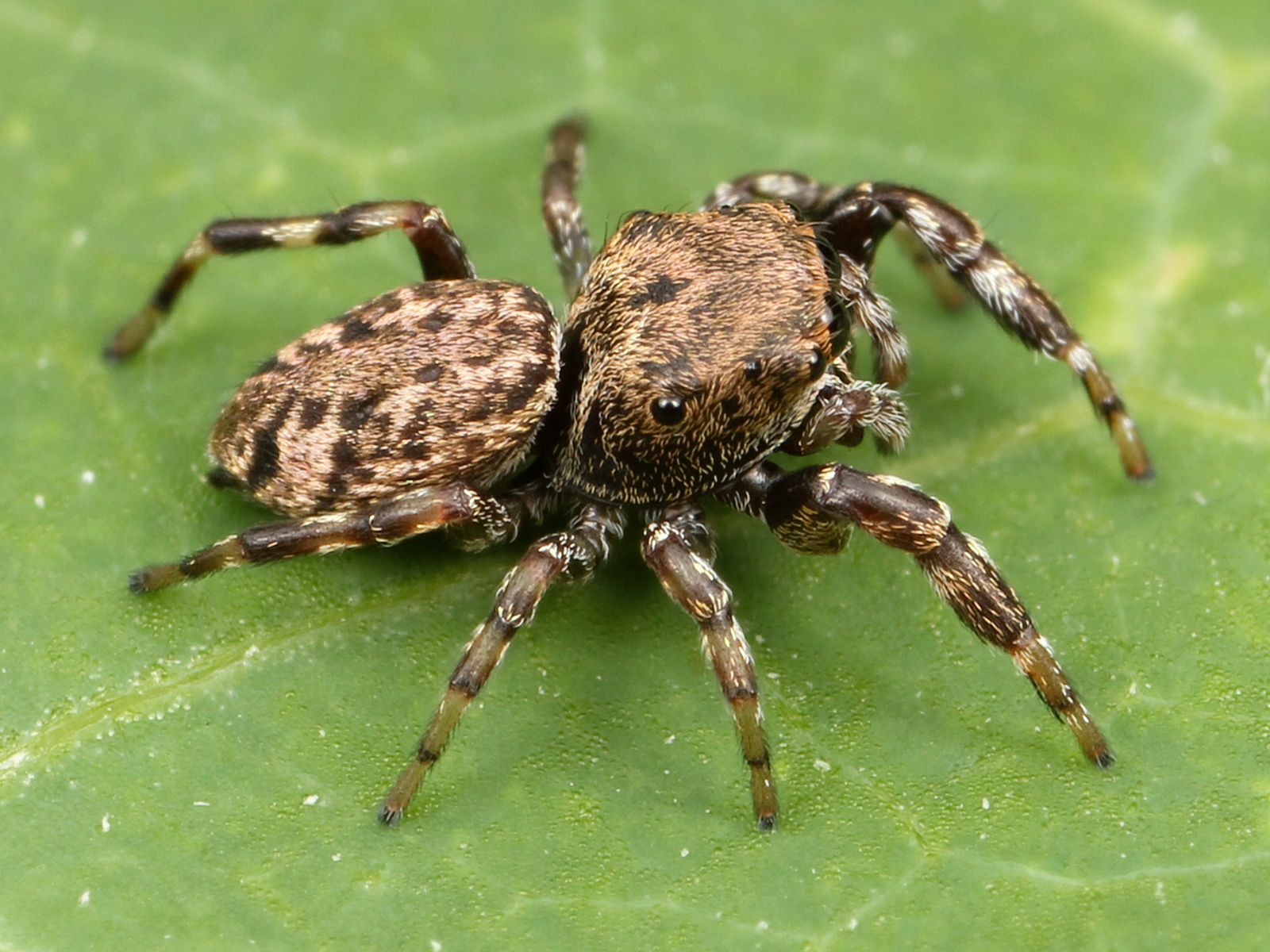
- Female

Scientific classification
- Kingdom: Animalia
- Phylum: Arthropoda
- Subphylum: Chelicerata
- Class: Arachnida
- Order: Araneae
- Infraorder: Araneomorphae
- Family: Salticidae
- Genus: Zygoballus
- Species: Z. nervosus

Binomial name
- Zygoballus nervosus (Peckham & Peckham, 1888)

Synonyms
- Eris nervosus Peckham & Peckham, 1888; Zygoballus terrestris Emerton, 1891

= Zygoballus nervosus =

Species of spider

Zygoballus nervosus is a species of jumping spider which occurs in the eastern United States and Canada.

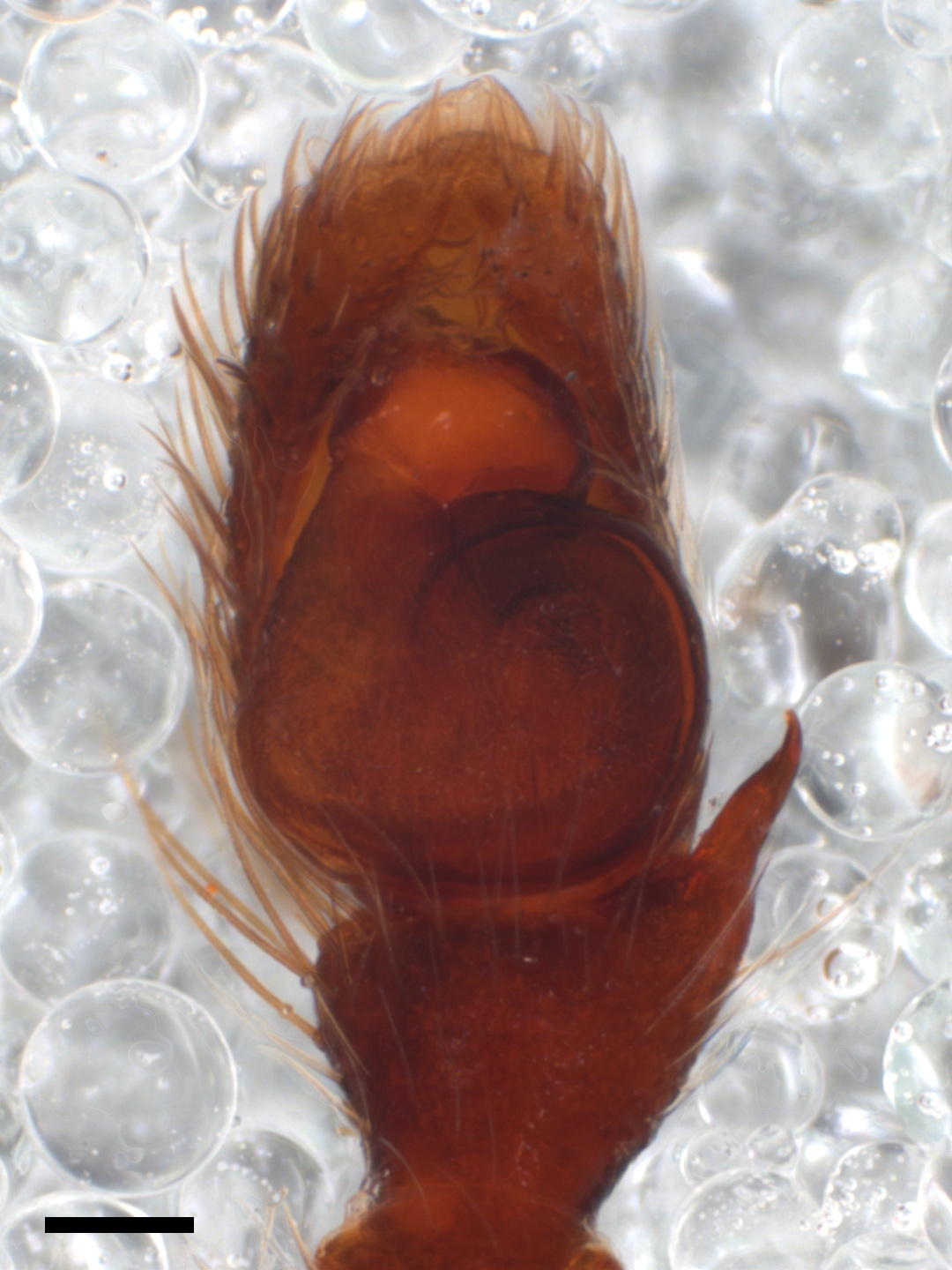
Male pedipalp, scale = 0.1 mm.

== Taxonomy ==
The species was first described by the arachnologists George and Elizabeth Peckham in 1888 as Eris nervosus. Arachnologist James Emerton subsequently described the species in 1891 as Zygoballus terrestris. After examining the type specimen of Eris nervosus, however, Emerton concluded that they were the same species. In 1909, the Peckhams renamed the species Zygoballus nervosus and synonymized the previous names.

== Distribution ==
In 1909, the Peckhams reported that the species had been collected from Maine, Massachusetts, Connecticut, New York, Virginia, and Illinois. Later records report the species from Georgia, Florida, Minnesota, eastern and central Texas, Ohio, Kansas, Louisiana, and Quebec. The range of Z. nervosus overlaps with that of two other Zygoballus species, Z. sexpunctatus and Z. rufipes.

== Diagnosis ==
The male Zygoballus nervosus can be distinguished from Z. sexpunctatus by its lack of a large spot of white scales at the beginning of the thoracic slope. It also lacks the thick covering of white scales on the sides of the carapace which extend from the clypeus to beyond the posterior median eyes in Z. sexpunctatus.

The male Z. nervosus can be distinguished from Z. rufipes by its wider, heavier cephalothorax, its shorter chelicerae, and its longer, narrower hammer-like process on the chelicerae. In addition, the thoracic slope is not as steep as in Z. rufipes.

The legs and pedipalps of the male Z. nervosus are shorter and thicker than those of Z. rufipes or Z. sexpunctatus. The tibia of the anterior legs are typically 2½ times as long as wide, compared to about 4 times in Z. sexpunctatus or 4 to 6 times in Z. rufipes.

The female Z. nervosus can be distinguished by the distinct form of the epigyne, which has its openings towards the front and very close together.

== Description ==
Adult females are 3 to 4 mm in body length, while males are 2.5 to 4.5 mm. The sides of the cephalothorax are nearly vertical in front, and more rounded in the back. The ocular area occupies nearly three-fifths of the length of the cephalothorax and is widest at the posterior lateral eyes (PLE). The anterior median eyes (AME) are twice as large as the anterior lateral eyes (ALE), while the PLE are roughly the same size as the ALE.
