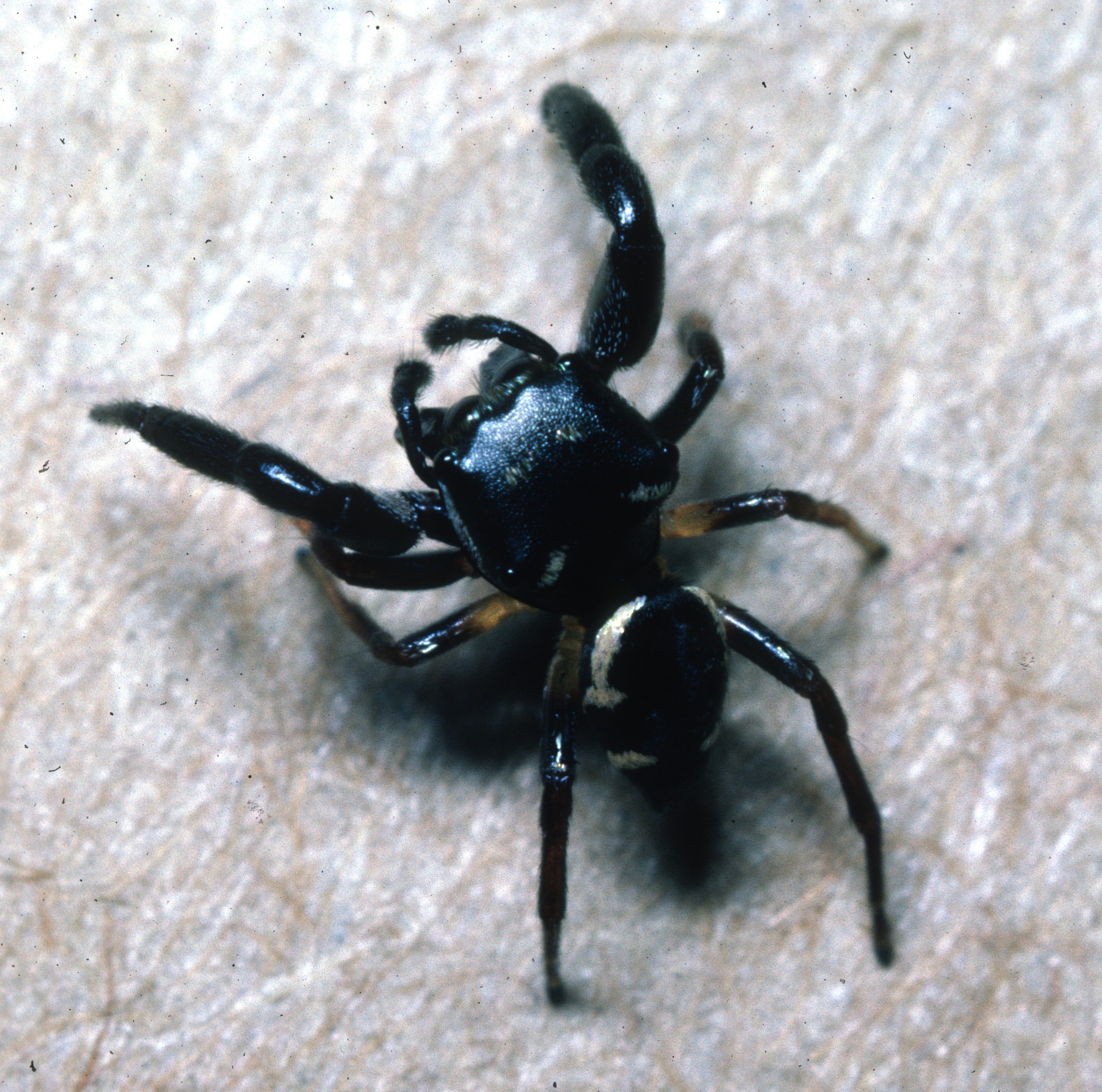
- Adult male Zygoballus minutus from Chiapas, Mexico

Scientific classification
- Kingdom: Animalia
- Phylum: Arthropoda
- Subphylum: Chelicerata
- Class: Arachnida
- Order: Araneae
- Infraorder: Araneomorphae
- Family: Salticidae
- Genus: Zygoballus
- Species: Z. minutus

Binomial name
- Zygoballus minutus Peckham & Peckham, 1896

= Zygoballus minutus =

Species of spider

Zygoballus minutus is a species of jumping spider in the genus Zygoballus that was first identified in Guatemala. The spider has also been found in Mexico, and the distribution may extend across Central America. Zygoballus minutus was first described by George and Elizabeth Peckham in 1898. It is a small spider, which is recalled in the name, which is the Latin for small, ranging in length between 3.5 and 4 mm (0.14 and 0.16 in). The male is distinguished by bands of white hair on the abdomen while the female has a pattern of streaks and bands. The palpal bulbs, which are reddish-brown on the male and yellow on the female, are also a distinguishing feature from other species in the genus.

== Taxonomy ==
Zygoballus minutus was first described by American arachnologists George and Elizabeth Peckham in 1898. It was allocated to the genus Zygoballus. Zygoballus had previously been raised by the Peckhams in 1885. The name derived from a Greek words meaning yoke and the genus name Ballus. The species name derives from the Latin word for small. Genetic analysis has demonstrated that the genus is a member of the monophyletc clade of dendryphantine spiders, related to the genus Terralonus. It is allocated to the tribe Dendryphantini and is one of 56 genera in the subtribe Dendryphantina.

== Description ==
Zygoballus minutus is a small spider. The male has total length of approximately 3.5 mm (0.14 in). it has a dark brown cephalothorax that is slightly convex, 1.8 mm (0.071 in) long and 1.6 mm (0.063 in) wide. It has a white band across the base. The abdomen is also dark brown and has a recognisable band of white hair on the front and two more on the back. It has reddish-brown palpal bulbs, a colour shared with many of the legs.

The female is similar to the male in shape, but slightly larger, measuring 4 mm (0.16 in) in length. The cephalothorax and abdomen are similarly dark brown, but have yellow hairs that the Peckhams considered may be the vestigial remains of a wider covering. The pattern on the abdomen is distinctive, consisting of pale bands and streaks. The palpal bulbs and majority of the legs are yellow. The spider is similar to others in the genus, but can be differentiated from both Zygoballus tibialis and Zygoballus maculatus by the copulatory organs and the shape of the palpal bulbs.

== Distribution ==
Zygoballus minutus was first observed in central Guatemala. In a similar way to the similar Zygoballus maculatus, the species in reported as being endemic to the country. However, the distribution is likely to be wider and include other areas of Central America extending as north as Mexico, where the species has also been found.
