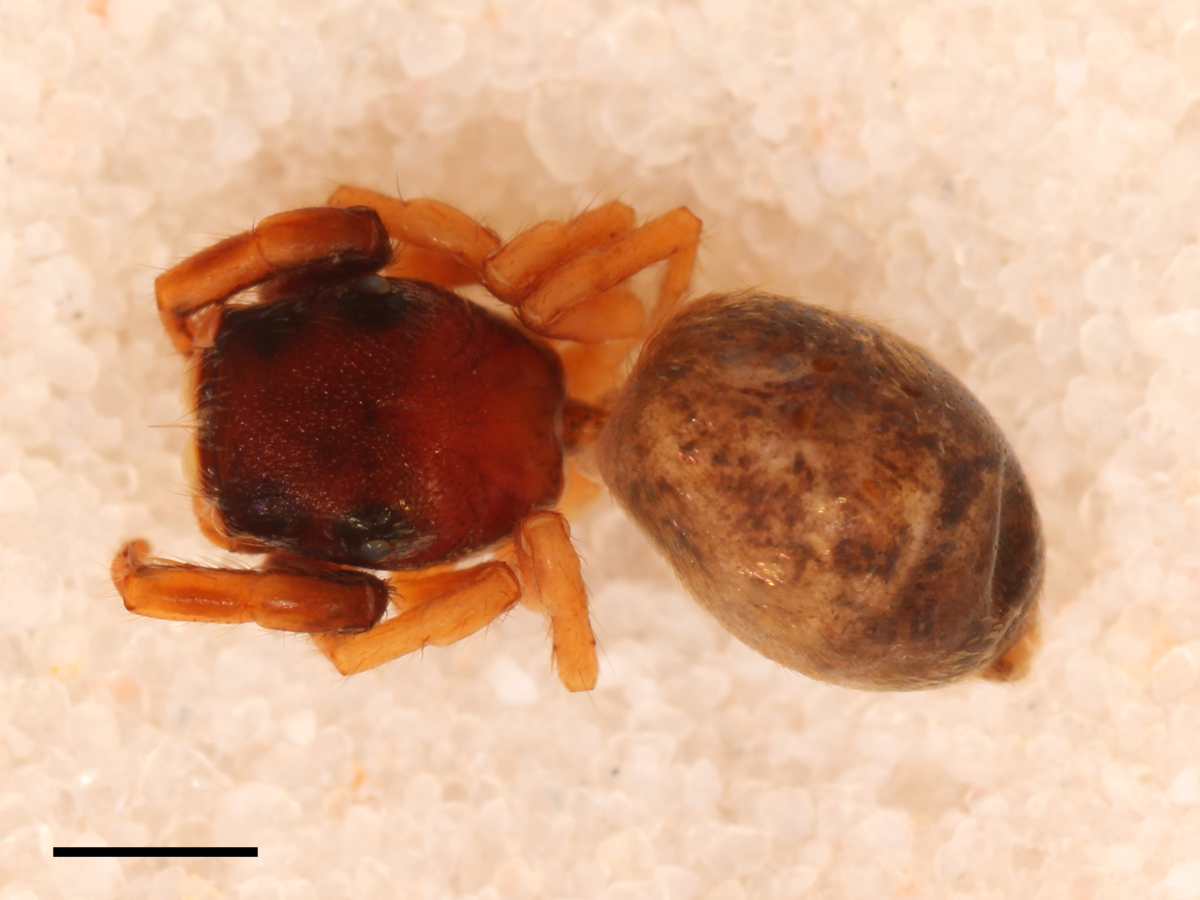
- Zygoballus iridescens holotype, dorsal view

Scientific classification
- Kingdom: Animalia
- Phylum: Arthropoda
- Subphylum: Chelicerata
- Class: Arachnida
- Order: Araneae
- Infraorder: Araneomorphae
- Family: Salticidae
- Genus: Zygoballus
- Species: Z. iridescens

Binomial name
- Zygoballus iridescens Banks, 1895

= Zygoballus iridescens =

Species of spider

Zygoballus iridescens is a species of jumping spider which occurs in the United States. It is known only from a single female specimen collected in Franconia, New Hampshire by Annie Trumbull Slosson.

Slosson's specimen was the basis for entomologist Nathan Banks' description of the species, which was published in Canadian Entomologist in 1895:

Zygoballus iridescens, nov. sp.
Length, 4.1 mm.; ceph.,1.8 mm. long, 1.4 mm. wide. Eye-region black, thoracic part reddish, both with whitish hairs and scales. Anterior femora black, black stripe above and on inner side of patella and tibia I., rest of legs pale yellowish, without any spots. Mandibles and mouth parts red-brown; sternum black. Abdomen black, clothed above and on sides with iridescent scales and long hairs; venter black, hairy, and with two indistinct rows of pale spots. Structure in general similar to Z. bettini, but the mandibles are not quite so large; and the sternum is much broader, not narrowed in front, so that the anterior coxae, which are not as long as in Z. bettini, are more widely separated. The region of the epigynum is red-brown, and is semicircular in outline; showing four pale spots, two in front close together, and one in each posterior corner. Franconia, N. H. (Mrs. Annie T. Slosson).

Arachnologists George and Elizabeth Peckham commented on the specimen in their 1909 work Revision of the Attidae of North America: "Iridescens B., which Mr. Banks has kindly lent us for examination, is founded upon an example which is not quite mature, and we think it may be Bettini." (Zygoballus bettini is now a synonym of Zygoballus rufipes.)

The type specimen is housed at the Museum of Comparative Zoology, Harvard University.
