= Zygoballus melloleitaoi =

Scientific classification
- Kingdom: Animalia
- Phylum: Arthropoda
- Subphylum: Chelicerata
- Class: Arachnida
- Order: Araneae
- Infraorder: Araneomorphae
- Family: Salticidae
- Genus: Zygoballus
- Species: Z. melloleitaoi

Binomial name
- Zygoballus melloleitaoi Galiano, 1980

Synonyms
- Gastromicans sexpunctata Mello-Leitão, 1945

Species of spider

Zygoballus melloleitaoi is a species of jumping spider which occurs in Argentina. It is known only from a single female specimen collected in Puerto Victoria, Misiones.

== Taxonomy ==
The species was originally described in 1945 by Brazilian arachnologist Cândido Firmino de Mello-Leitão as Gastromicans sexpunctata. In 1980, the Argentinian arachnologist María Elena Galiano transferred the species to the genus Zygoballus. Because the name Zygoballus sexpunctatus was already in use, Galiano gave the species a new name, Zygoballus melloleitaoi, in honor of Mello-Leitão. Jerzy Prószyński's Global Species Database of Salticidae lists the species as "dubious". However, it is listed as a recognized species by Platnick's World Spider Catalog (Version 10.5).

== Description ==
The only known specimen is a female 4 mm in length.

The type specimen is housed at the La Plata Museum in Argentina (Zenzes collection, No. 16.785).
