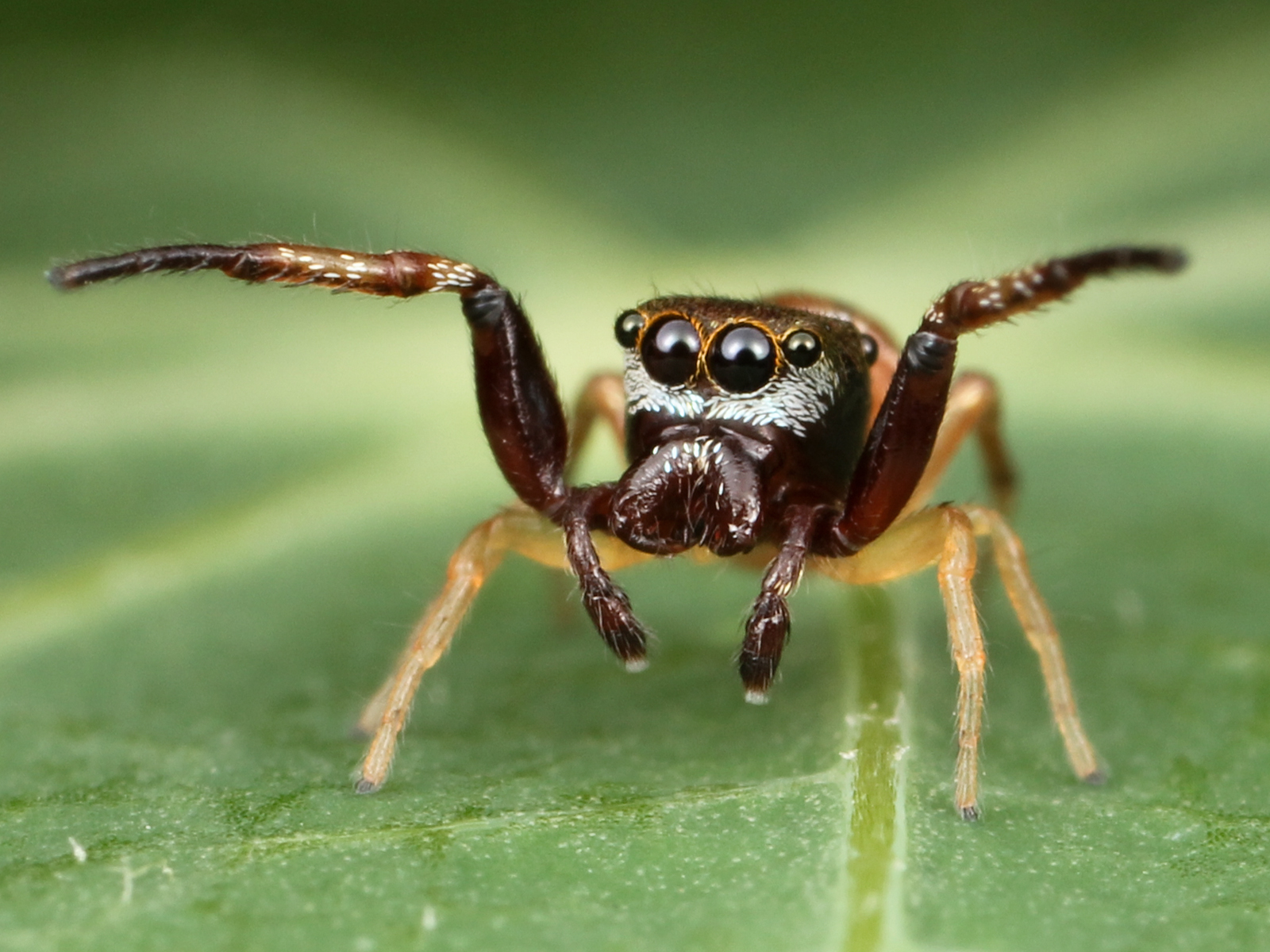
- Adult male Zygoballus rufipes (hammerjawed jumper) from Massachusetts

Scientific classification
- Kingdom: Animalia
- Phylum: Arthropoda
- Subphylum: Chelicerata
- Class: Arachnida
- Order: Araneae
- Infraorder: Araneomorphae
- Family: Salticidae
- Subfamily: Salticinae
- Genus: Zygoballus; Peckham & Peckham, 1885

Type species
- Zygoballus rufipes Peckham & Peckham, 1885

Species
- See text

Diversity
- approx. 20 species

Synonyms
- Amerotritte Mello-Leitão, 1944

= Zygoballus =

Genus of spiders

Zygoballus is a genus of jumping spiders found in North and South America.

== Taxonomy and history ==
The genus was first described in 1885 by American arachnologists George and Elizabeth Peckham based on the type species Zygoballus rufipes. The name derives from a combination of the Ancient Greek word ζυγόν (zygon), meaning "yoke", and the genus name Ballus. The etymology of Ballus is unknown, but may be related to the Greek word βαλλίζω (ballizo), meaning "dance" or "jump about".

The genus Messua, based on the type species Messua desidiosa, was synonymized with Zygoballus by Eugène Simon in 1903. Simon argued that Messua desidiosa was a transitional species which differed "much less from typical Zygoballus than would seem to be indicated by [the Peckham's] description." This synonymy was reversed by Wayne Maddison in 1996, and Messua restored as a valid genus.

The genus Amerotritte, based on the type species Amerotritte lineata, was synonymized with Zygoballus in 1980 by María Elena Galiano. Galiano stated that the holotype of Amerotritte lineata was actually a very young Zygoballus specimen.

Zygoballus is currently classified in the subtribe Dendryphantina of the family Salticidae (jumping spiders).

== Description ==
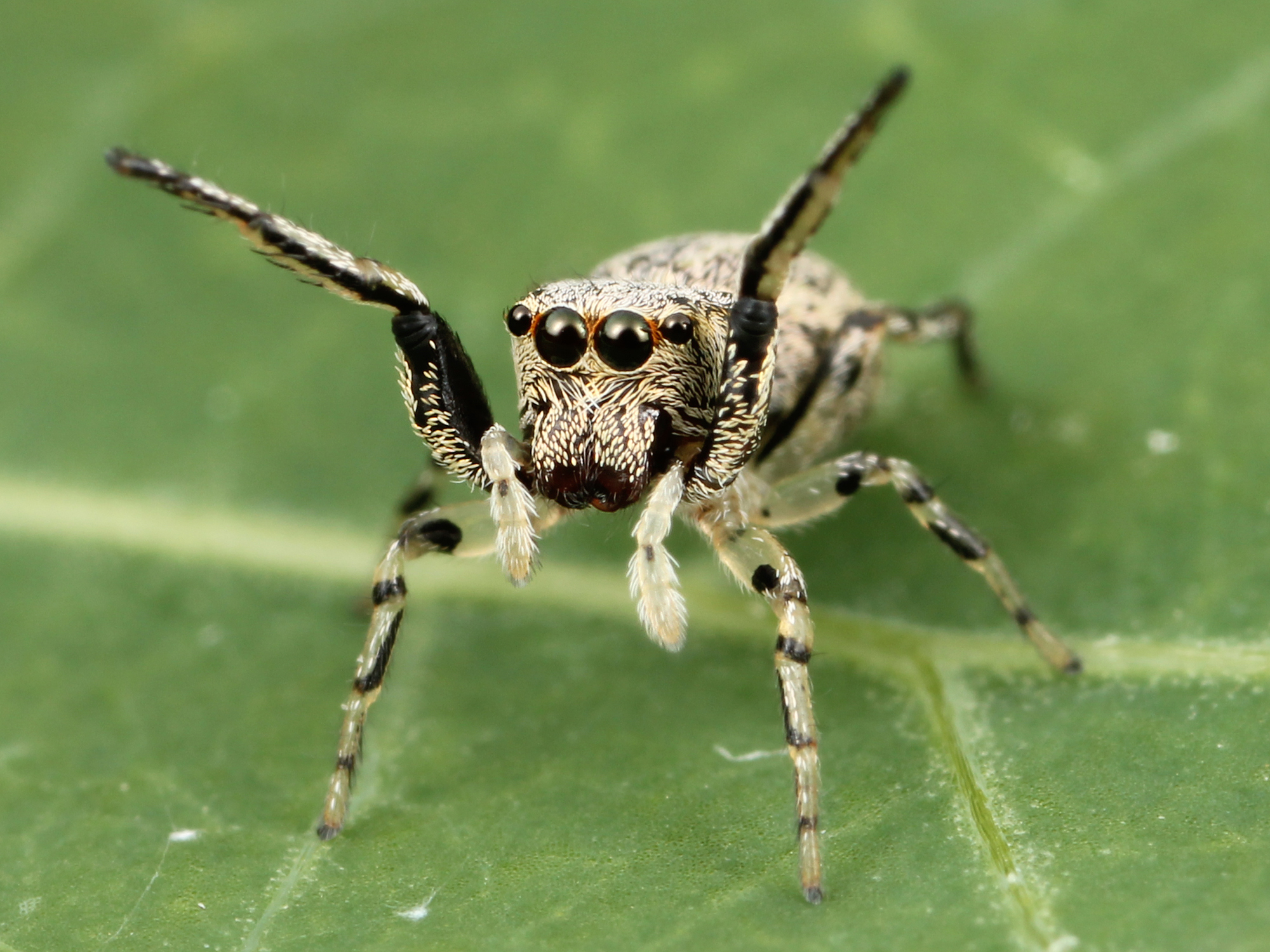
Female Zygoballus rufipes jumping spider from Laurens County, South Carolina

Spiders of the genus Zygoballus share a strong resemblance in appearance. The cephalothorax is high and roughly square when viewed from above. It is widest at the posterior eyes, with the ocular quadrangle occupying approximately three-fifths of the cephalothorax. The cephalothorax slopes steeply behind the posterior eyes and the sides of the cephalothorax are nearly vertical. The labium is as long or longer than it is wide. The anterior (first) pair of legs are the largest, with three pairs of spines on the ventral surface of the tibia. Males have obliquely oriented chelicerae with long fangs.

Many species exhibit wide variation in color, size, and markings.

== Distribution ==
Zygoballus is a genus from the New World, ranging from Argentina to Canada. Three species from India were originally placed in Zygoballus, but have been reassigned to other genera.

== Species ==
As of July 2016, the World Spider Catalog accepted the species listed below. One species, Z. quaternus, was previously recognized (prior to 2008), but is now considered a nomen dubium. Several other species are known only from single specimens. In addition to the species listed below, a 2001 phylogenetic analysis suggested that Rhetenor texanus may also belong in Zygoballus, but this has not been accepted by the World Spider Catalog.

- Zygoballus amrishi Makhan, 2005 — Suriname
- Zygoballus aschnae Makhan, 2005 — Suriname
- Zygoballus concolor Bryant, 1940 — Cuba
- Zygoballus electus Chickering, 1946 — Panama
- Zygoballus gracilipes Crane, 1945 — Guyana, Argentina
- Zygoballus incertus (Banks, 1929) — Panama
- Zygoballus iridescens Banks, 1895 — USA
- Zygoballus lineatus (Mello-Leitão, 1944) — Argentina
- Zygoballus maculatipes Petrunkevitch, 1925 — Panama
- Zygoballus maculatus F. O. P-Cambridge, 1901 — Guatemala
- Zygoballus melloleitaoi Galiano, 1980 — Argentina
- Zygoballus minutus Peckham & Peckham, 1896 — Guatemala
- Zygoballus nervosus (Peckham & Peckham, 1888) — USA, Canada
- Zygoballus optatus Chickering, 1946 — Panama
- Zygoballus remotus Peckham & Peckham, 1896 — Guatemala
- Zygoballus rishwani Makhan, 2005 — Suriname
- Zygoballus rufipes Peckham & Peckham, 1885 — Canada to Costa Rica
- Zygoballus sexpunctatus (Hentz, 1845) — USA
- Zygoballus suavis Peckham & Peckham, 1895 — Jamaica
- Zygoballus tibialis F. O. P.-Cambridge, 1901 — Guatemala to Panama
