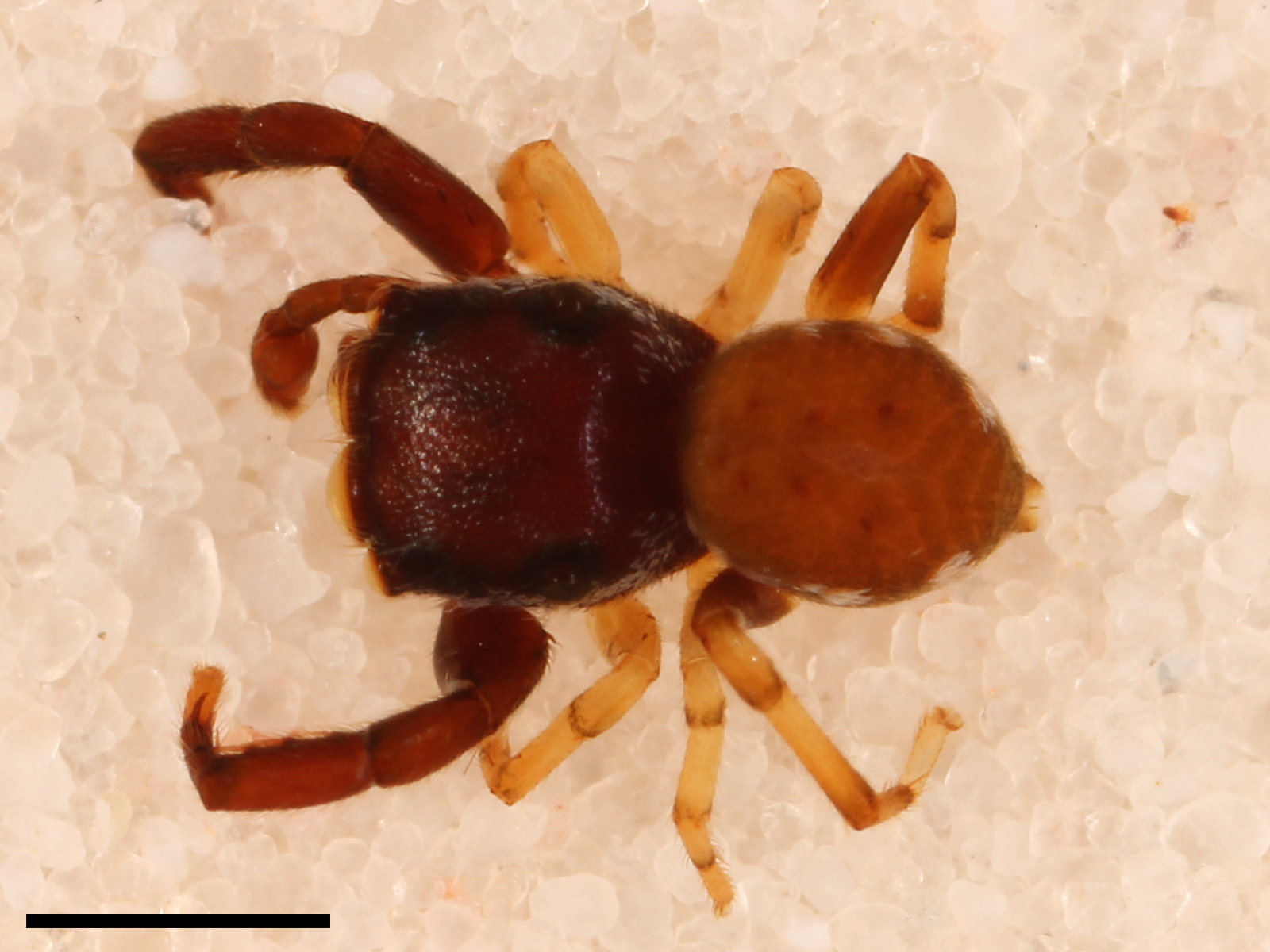
- Zygoballus electus holotype (male)

Scientific classification
- Kingdom: Animalia
- Phylum: Arthropoda
- Subphylum: Chelicerata
- Class: Arachnida
- Order: Araneae
- Infraorder: Araneomorphae
- Family: Salticidae
- Genus: Zygoballus
- Species: Z. electus

Binomial name
- Zygoballus electus Chickering, 1946

= Zygoballus electus =

Species of spider

Zygoballus electus is a species of jumping spider which occurs in Panama. It was first described by the arachnologist Arthur M. Chickering in 1946. The type specimens are housed at the Museum of Comparative Zoology in the United States.

The species has been collected from several areas of Panama including El Valle de Antón, Portobelo, and Barro Colorado Island (Canal Zone Biological Area).
