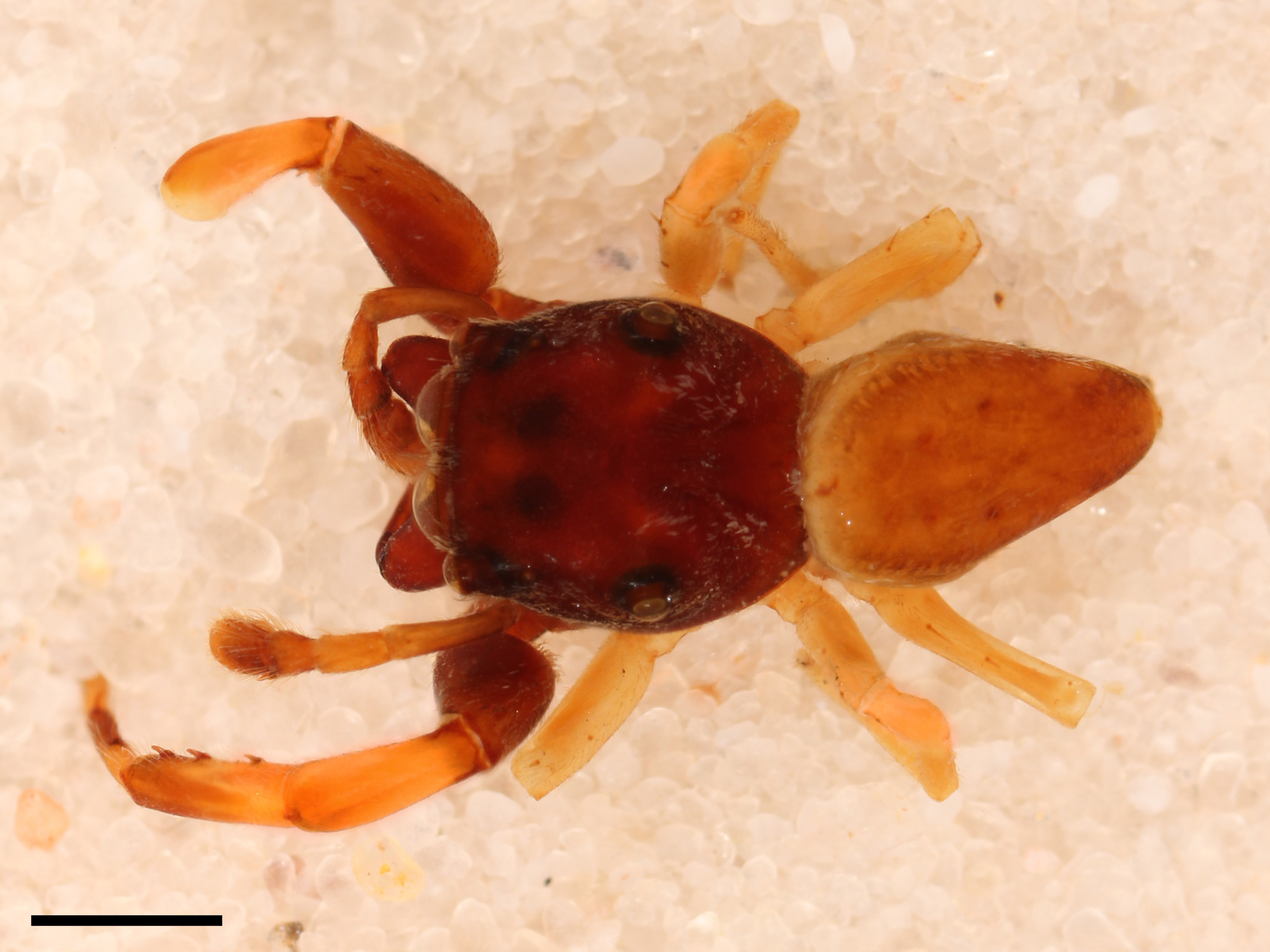
- Zygoballus remotus holotype (male)

Scientific classification
- Kingdom: Animalia
- Phylum: Arthropoda
- Subphylum: Chelicerata
- Class: Arachnida
- Order: Araneae
- Infraorder: Araneomorphae
- Family: Salticidae
- Genus: Zygoballus
- Species: Z. remotus

Binomial name
- Zygoballus remotus Peckham & Peckham, 1896

= Zygoballus remotus =

Species of spider

Zygoballus remotus is a species of jumping spider which occurs in Guatemala. It was first described by the arachnologists George and Elizabeth Peckham in 1896.
