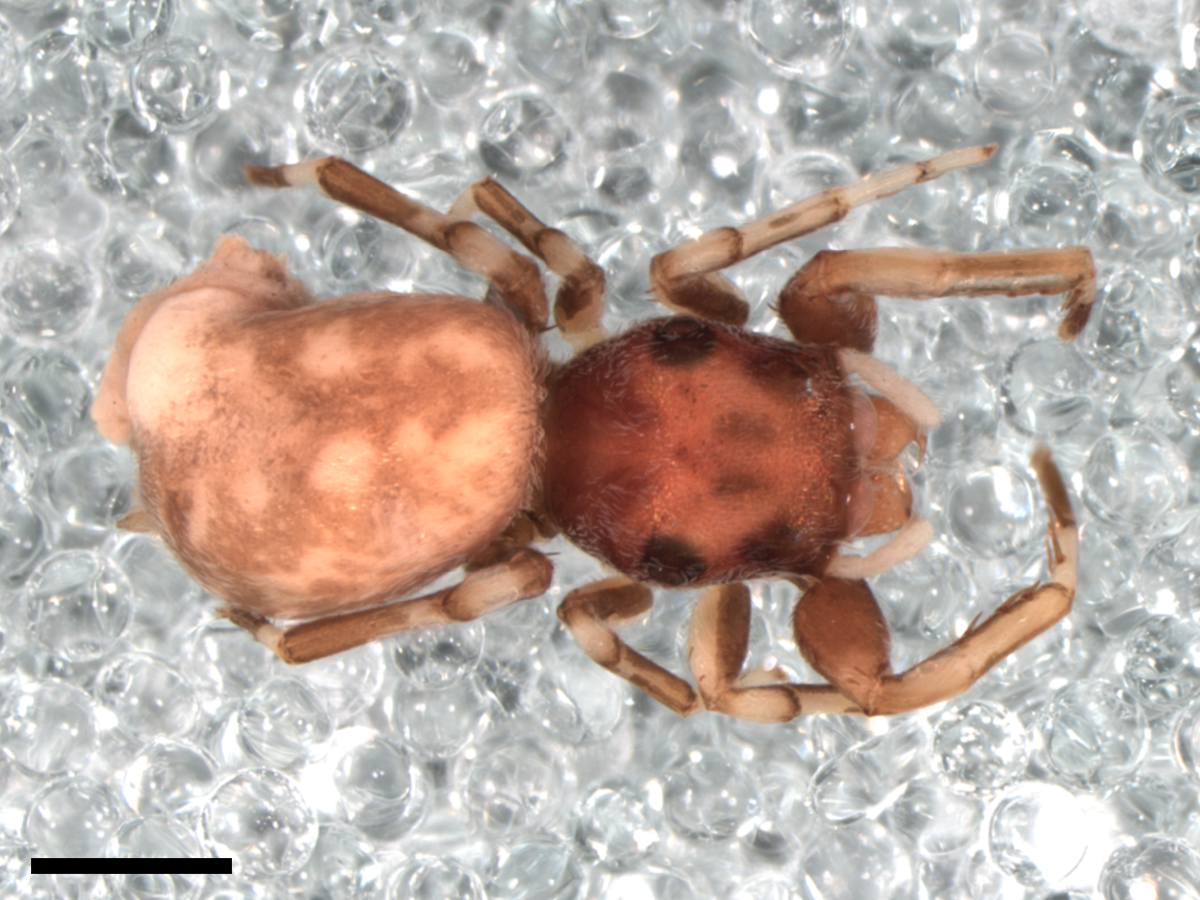

Scientific classification
- Kingdom: Animalia
- Phylum: Arthropoda
- Subphylum: Chelicerata
- Class: Arachnida
- Order: Araneae
- Infraorder: Araneomorphae
- Family: Salticidae
- Genus: Zygoballus
- Species: Z. maculatipes

Binomial name
- Zygoballus maculatipes Petrunkevitch, 1925

= Zygoballus maculatipes =

Species of spider

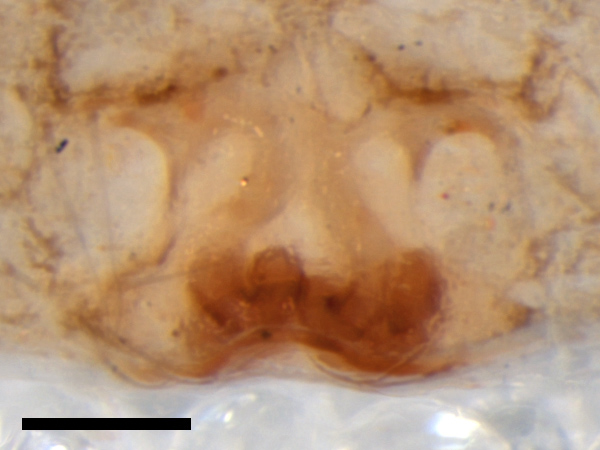
Epigyne of Zygoballus maculatipes holotype (scale = 1 mm)

Zygoballus maculatipes is a species of jumping spider which occurs in Panama. It is known only from two female specimens, one collected in Soná, and the other collected from the Wilcox camp on the San Lorenzo River (both in Veraguas Province). The species was first described in 1925 by the Russian arachnologist Alexander Petrunkevitch.

== Type specimen ==
The type specimens are housed at the Peabody Museum of Natural History at Yale University.
