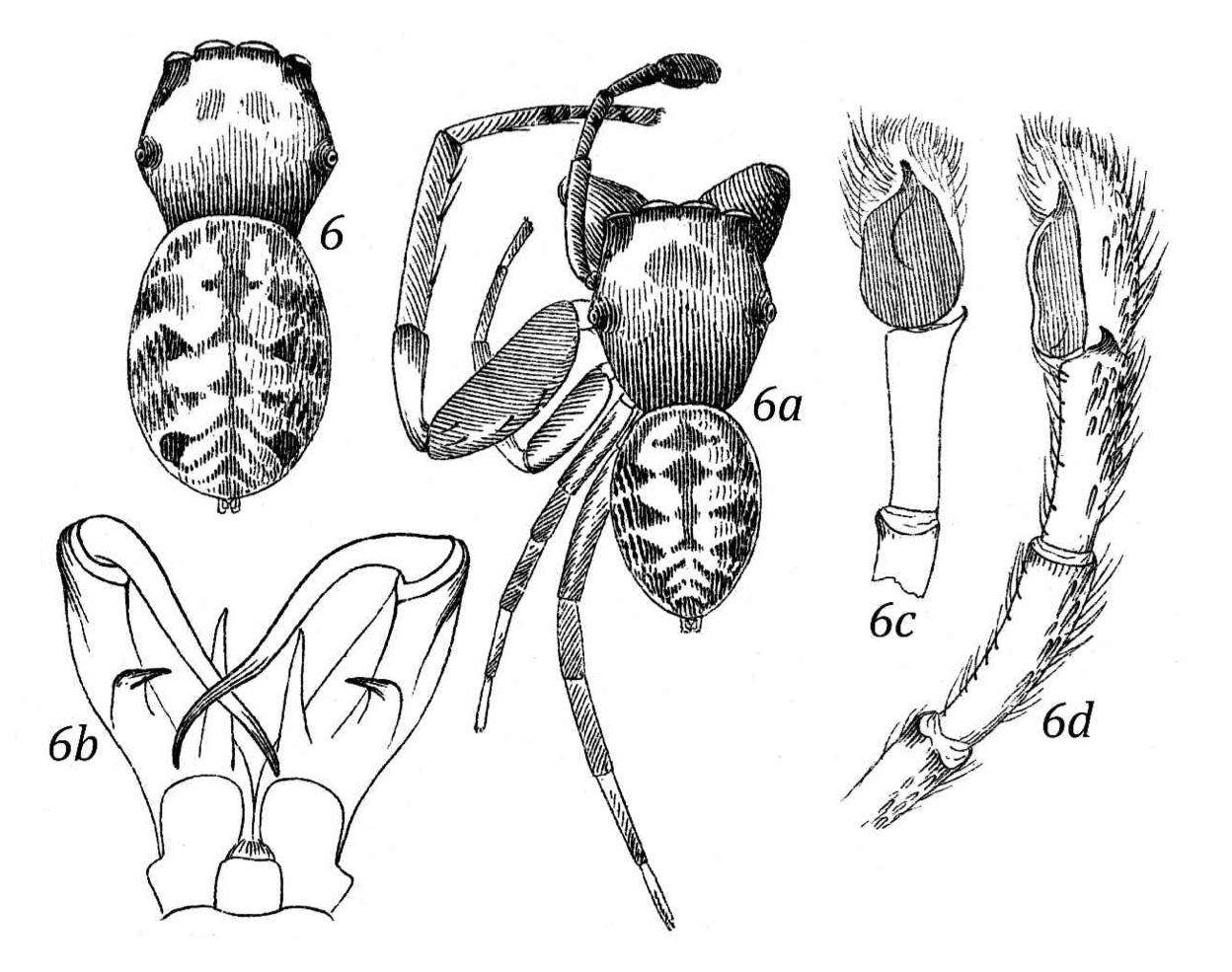
- Diagnostic drawings of Zygoballus suavis by James Henry Emerton

Scientific classification
- Kingdom: Animalia
- Phylum: Arthropoda
- Subphylum: Chelicerata
- Class: Arachnida
- Order: Araneae
- Infraorder: Araneomorphae
- Family: Salticidae
- Genus: Zygoballus
- Species: Z. suavis

Binomial name
- Zygoballus suavis Peckham & Peckham, 1895

= Zygoballus suavis =

Species of spider

Zygoballus suavis is a species of jumping spider which occurs in Jamaica. The species was first described in 1895 by George and Elizabeth Peckham from specimens collected in Mandeville, Moneague, and Kingston. The type specimens are lost.
