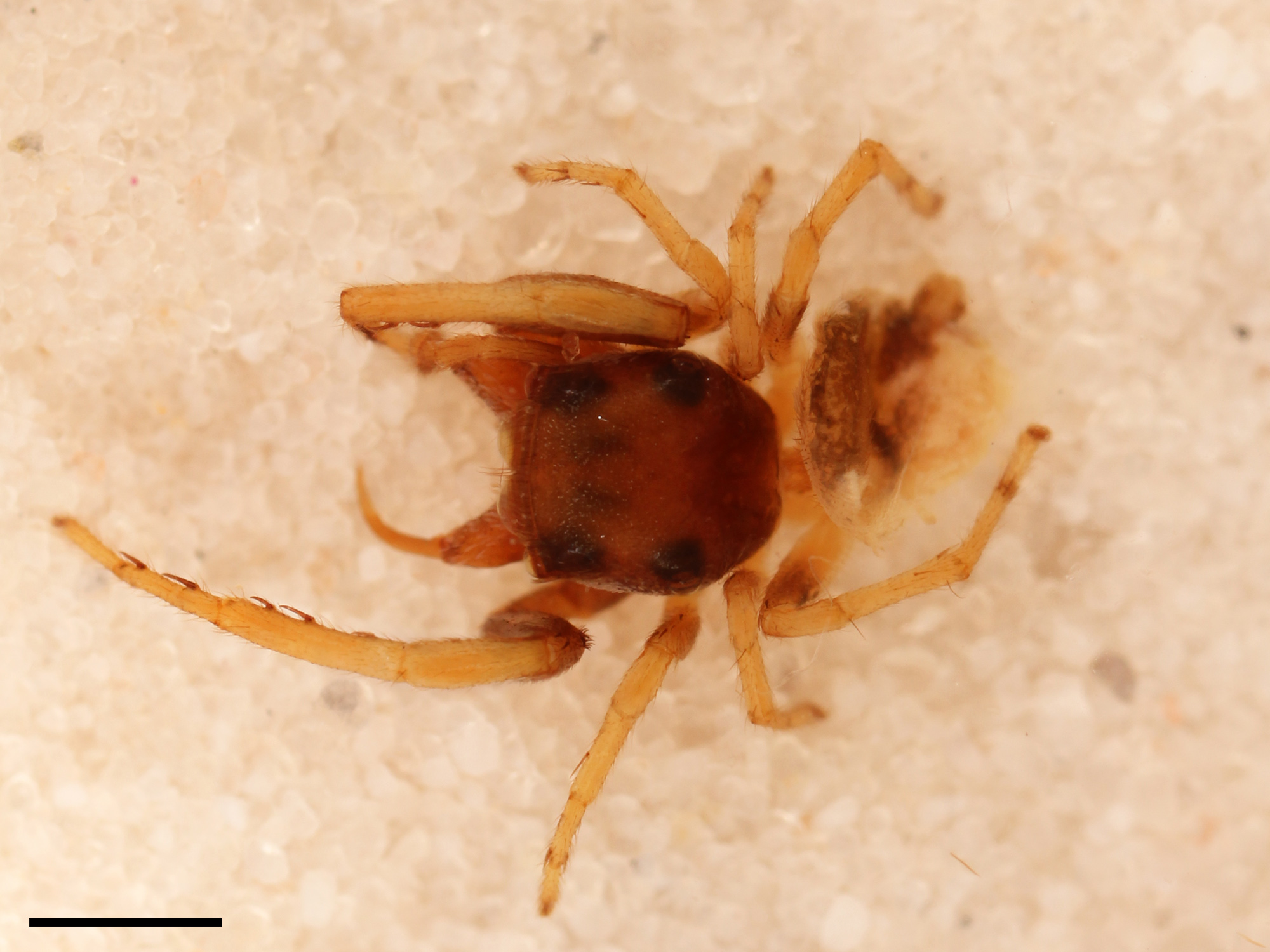
- Zygoballus concolor holotype (male)
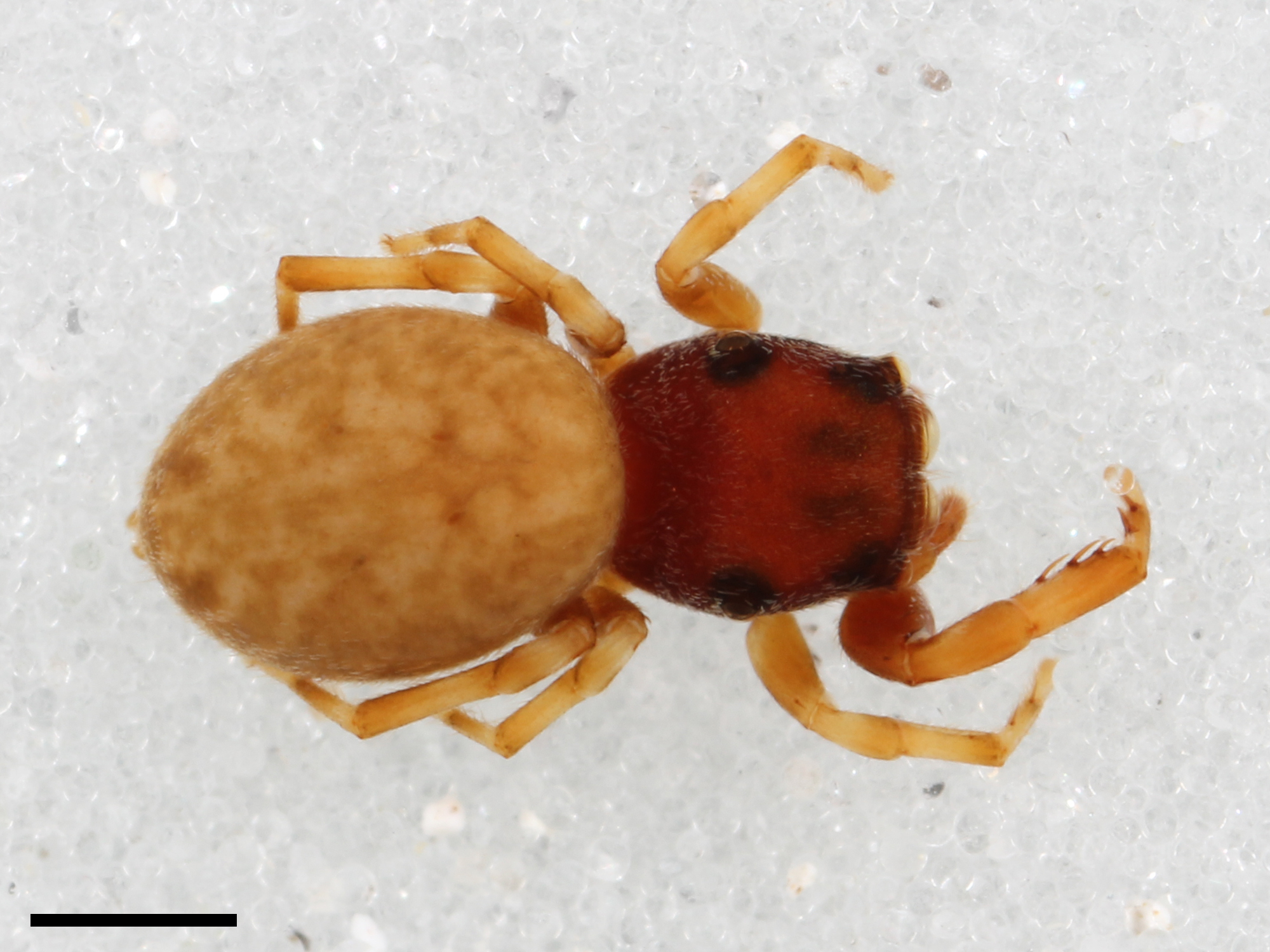
- Zygoballus concolor allotype (female)

Scientific classification
- Kingdom: Animalia
- Phylum: Arthropoda
- Subphylum: Chelicerata
- Class: Arachnida
- Order: Araneae
- Infraorder: Araneomorphae
- Family: Salticidae
- Genus: Zygoballus
- Species: Z. concolor

Binomial name
- Zygoballus concolor Bryant, 1940

= Zygoballus concolor =

Species of spider

Zygoballus concolor is a species of jumping spider which occurs in Cuba. It was first described by the arachnologist Elizabeth B. Bryant in 1940.

The male holotype was collected from Soledad, Consolación del Sur and the female allotype was collected from Havana. The type specimens are housed at the Museum of Comparative Zoology in the United States.
