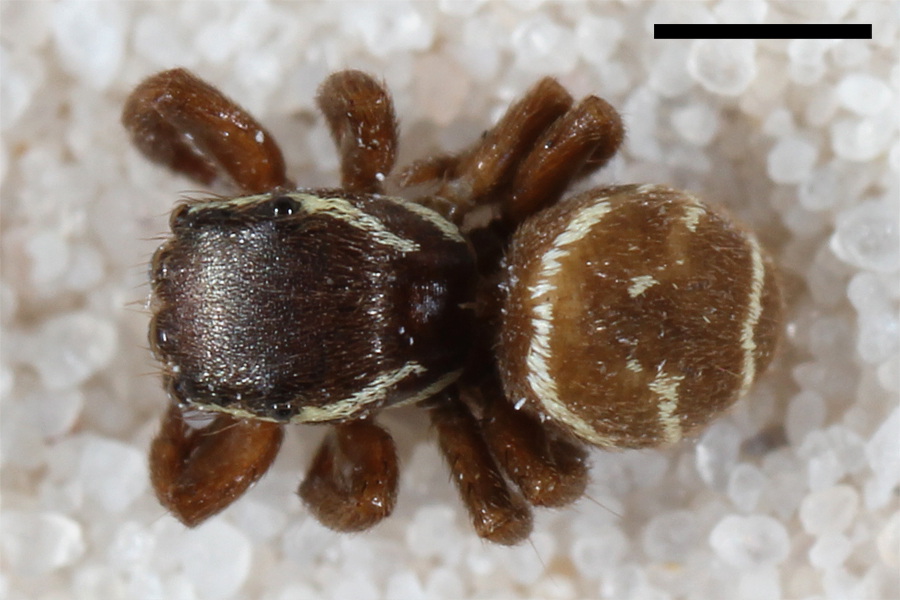
- female Zygoballus incertus
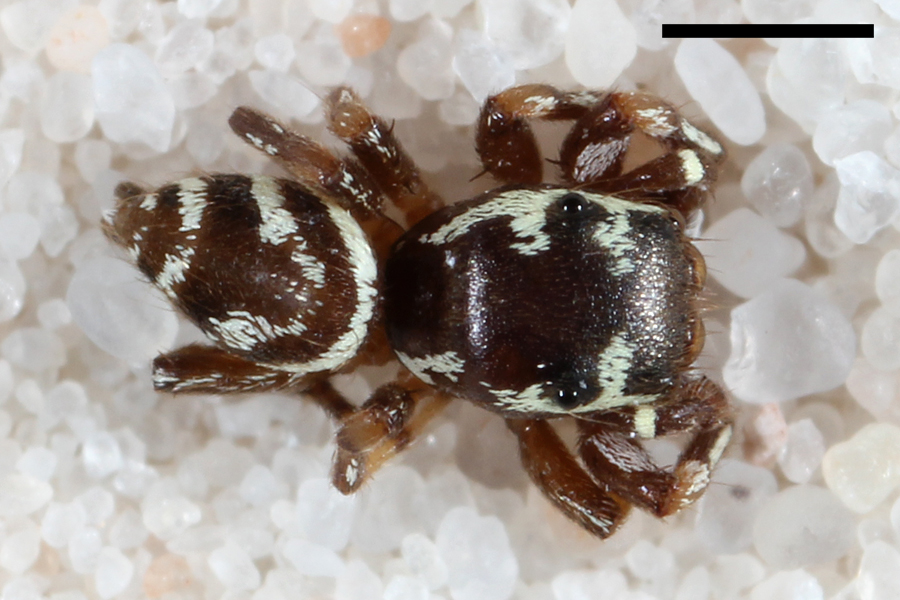
- male Zygoballus incertus

Scientific classification
- Kingdom: Animalia
- Phylum: Arthropoda
- Subphylum: Chelicerata
- Class: Arachnida
- Order: Araneae
- Infraorder: Araneomorphae
- Family: Salticidae
- Genus: Zygoballus
- Species: Z. incertus

Binomial name
- Zygoballus incertus (Nathan Banks, 1929)

Synonyms
- Atelurius incertus

= Zygoballus incertus =

Species of spider

Zygoballus incertus is a species of jumping spider. It is endemic to Panama, where it is known from Barro Colorado Island in the vicinity of the Panama Canal. Females of Zygoballus incertus are known to measure 3.5 mm (0.14 in) long, while males measure 3.2 mm (0.13 in). The species was initially described in the genus Atelurius, before being moved to Zygoballus.

== History and taxonomy ==
The species was first described from a female specimen from Barro Colorado Island by the entomologist Nathan Banks in 1929 as Atelurius incertus. Arachnologist Arthur M. Chickering described the species, including a male allotype, in his 1946 paper, "The Salticidae (Spiders) of Panama". Chickering expressed doubts about whether the species belonged to Atelurius: "I am unable to come to any decision as to the correct placement of this species... I know nothing better to do with it for the present than to retain it here pending further knowledge." In 1987, arachnologist María Elena Galiano reassigned Chickering's male allotype to Sassacus. Regarding the female type specimen, she remarked that it was "without a doubt fissidentate, and should be excluded from [Atelurius]." Citing the fact that Chickering noted similarities with Zygoballus, Galiano transferred the species out of Atelurius and into Zygoballus. Characteristics of the male were described in 1996 by Wayne Maddison.

== Description ==
Females of Zygoballus incertus are known to measure 3.5 mm (0.14 in) long, while males measure 3.2 mm (0.13 in). The holotype female had a reddish-brown cephalothorax and an abdomen that was black dorsally and pale below. There are several white bands marking the dorsal surface of the body.

== Distribution ==
Zygoballus incertus is endemic to Panama, where it is known from Barro Colorado Island in the vicinity of the Panama Canal.
