= Zygoballus lineatus =

Scientific classification
- Kingdom: Animalia
- Phylum: Arthropoda
- Subphylum: Chelicerata
- Class: Arachnida
- Order: Araneae
- Infraorder: Araneomorphae
- Family: Salticidae
- Genus: Zygoballus
- Species: Z. lineatus

Binomial name
- Zygoballus lineatus (Mello-Leitão, 1944)

Synonyms
- Amerotritte lineata Mello-Leitão, 1944

Species of spider

Zygoballus lineatus is a species of jumping spider which occurs in Argentina. It is known only from a single female specimen collected in Tigre, Buenos Aires.

== Taxonomy ==
The species was first described in 1944 by the Brazilian arachnologist Cândido Firmino de Mello-Leitão as Amerotritte lineata. It served as the type species of a new genus Amerotritte. In 1980, however, Argentinian arachnologist María Elena Galiano transferred the species to the genus Zygoballus, thus synonymizing Amerotritte. Galiano commented that the holotype is immature and listed the species as a species inquirenda. Jerzy Prószyński's Global Species Database of Salticidae lists the species as "dubious". However, it is listed as a recognized species by Platnick's World Spider Catalog (Version 10.5).

== Type specimen ==
The type specimen is housed at the La Plata Museum in Argentina (Prosen collection, No. 16.210).
