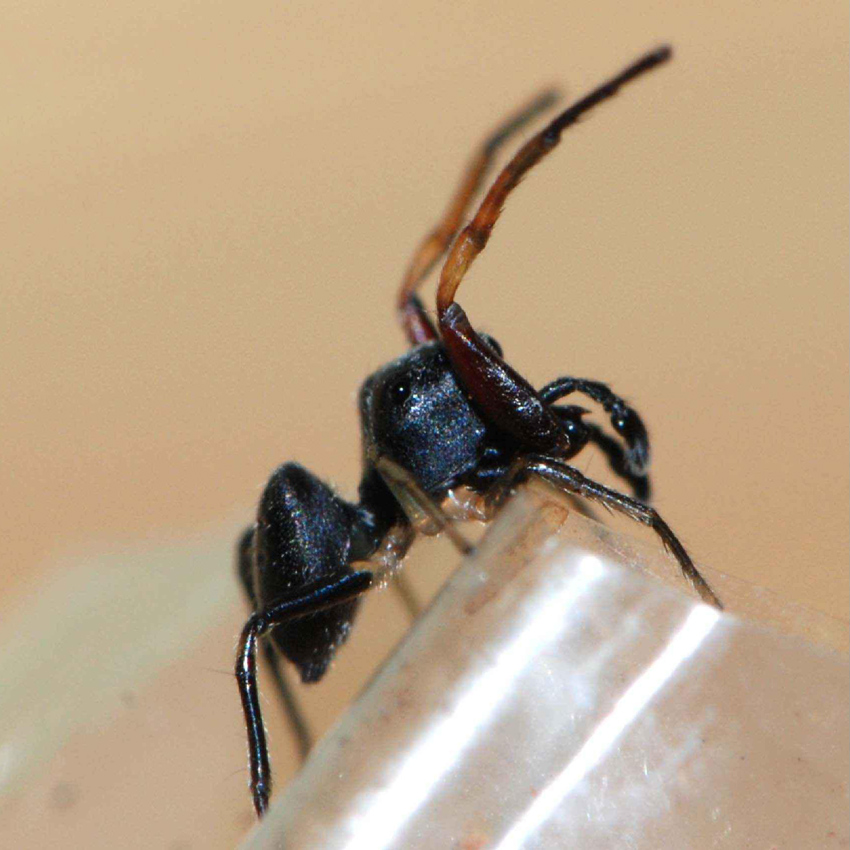
- Male from Misiones, Argentina

Scientific classification
- Kingdom: Animalia
- Phylum: Arthropoda
- Subphylum: Chelicerata
- Class: Arachnida
- Order: Araneae
- Infraorder: Araneomorphae
- Family: Salticidae
- Genus: Zygoballus
- Species: Z. gracilipes

Binomial name
- Zygoballus gracilipes Crane, 1945

= Zygoballus gracilipes =

Species of spider

Zygoballus gracilipes is a species of jumping spider which occurs in South America. It was first described by the biologist Jocelyn Crane in 1945. The type specimens are housed at The American Museum of Natural History in New York City.

The species has been collected from Kartabo, Guyana, and Bernardo de Irigoyen, Argentina.
