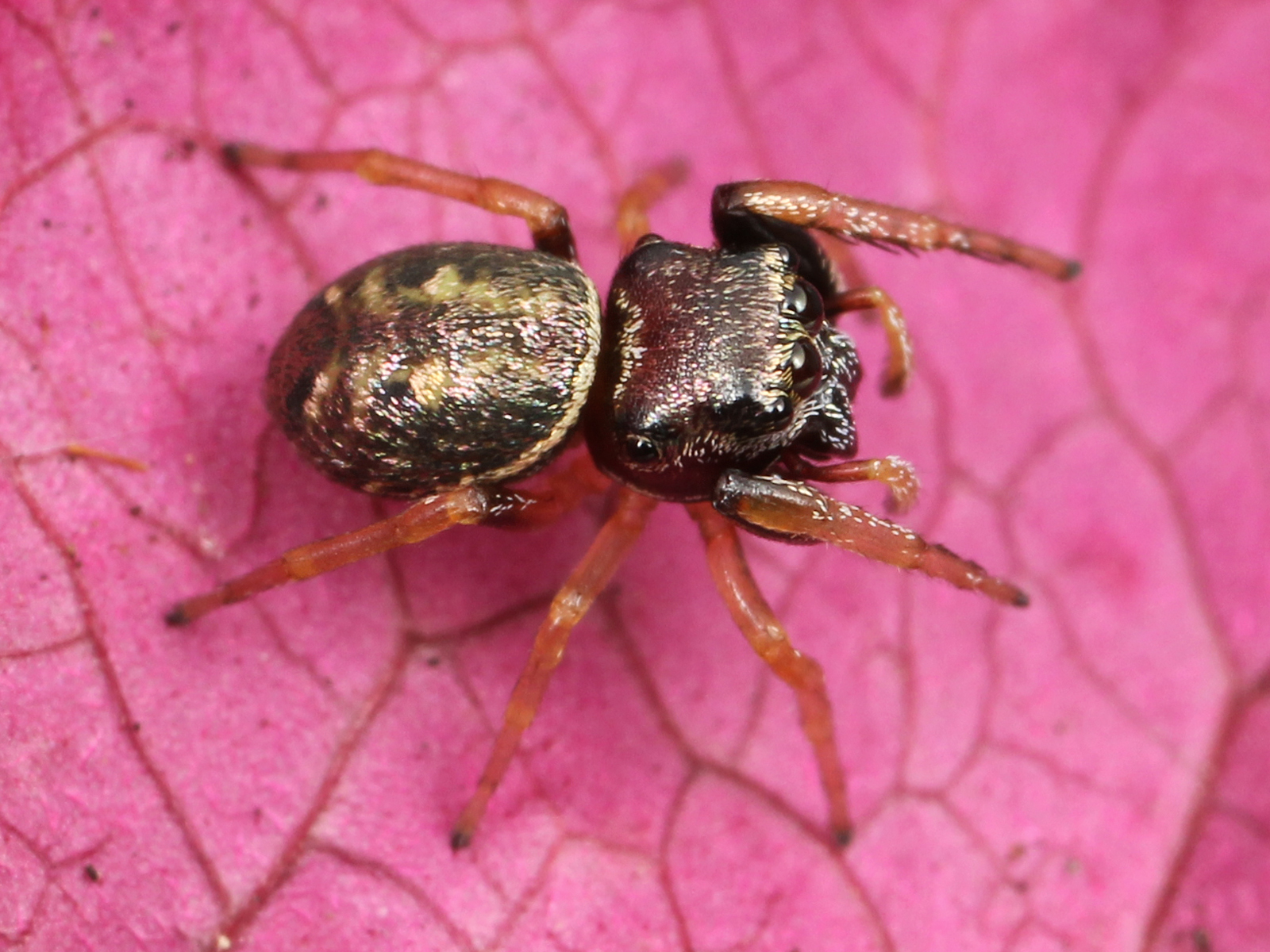
- Female
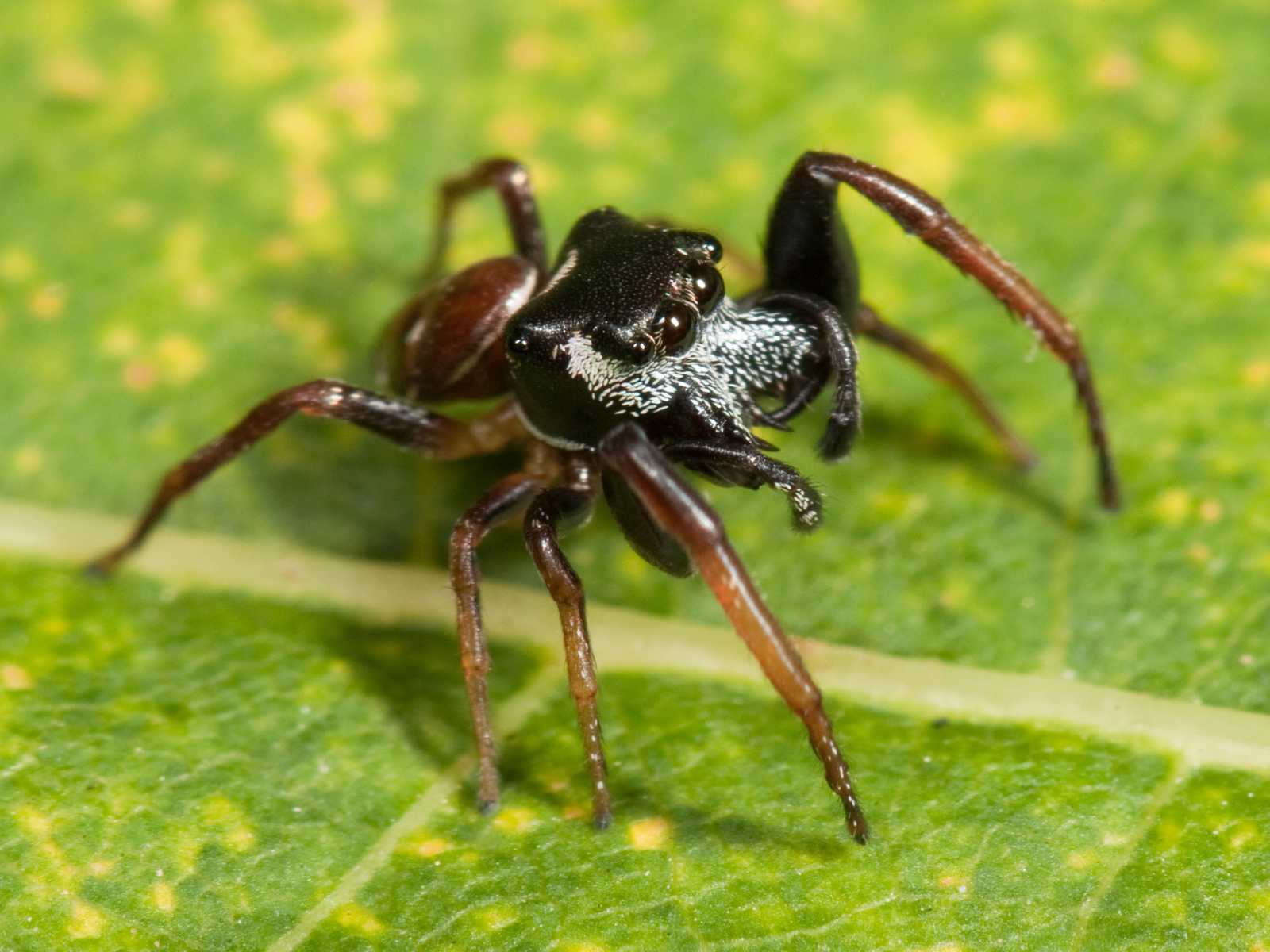
- Male

Scientific classification
- Kingdom: Animalia
- Phylum: Arthropoda
- Subphylum: Chelicerata
- Class: Arachnida
- Order: Araneae
- Infraorder: Araneomorphae
- Family: Salticidae
- Genus: Zygoballus
- Species: Z. sexpunctatus

Binomial name
- Zygoballus sexpunctatus (Hentz, 1845)
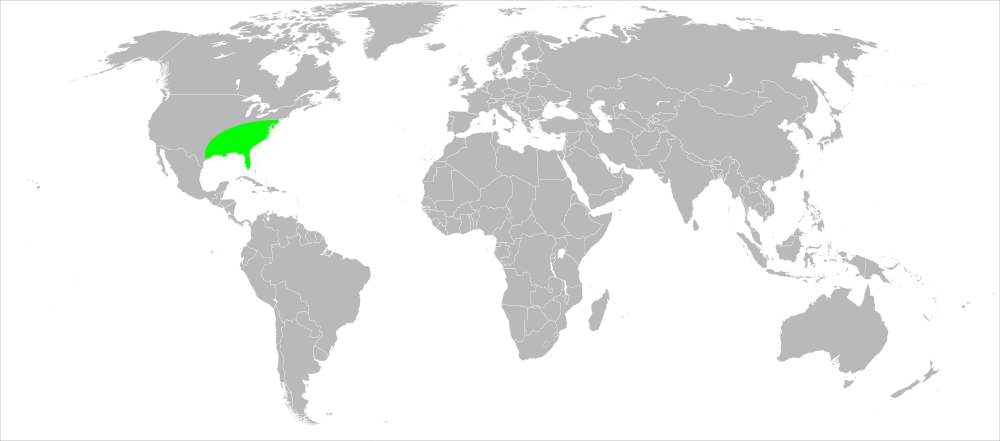
- Z. sexpunctatus is endemic to the southeastern United States.

Synonyms
- Attus sexpunctatus Hentz, 1845

= Zygoballus sexpunctatus =

Species of spider

Zygoballus sexpunctatus is a species of jumping spider which occurs in the southeastern United States where it can be found in a variety of grassy habitats. Adult spiders measure between 3 and 4.5 mm in length. The cephalothorax and abdomen are bronze to black in color, with reddish brown or yellowish legs. The male has distinctive enlarged chelicerae (the mouthparts used for grasping prey) and front femora (the third, and typically largest, leg segments). Like many jumping spiders, Z. sexpunctatus males exhibit ritualized courtship and agonistic behavior.

== Etymology ==
The specific name is derived from the Latin sex meaning "six" and punctum meaning "spot". This is a reference to the six spots typically occurring on the abdomen of the male.

== History and taxonomy ==
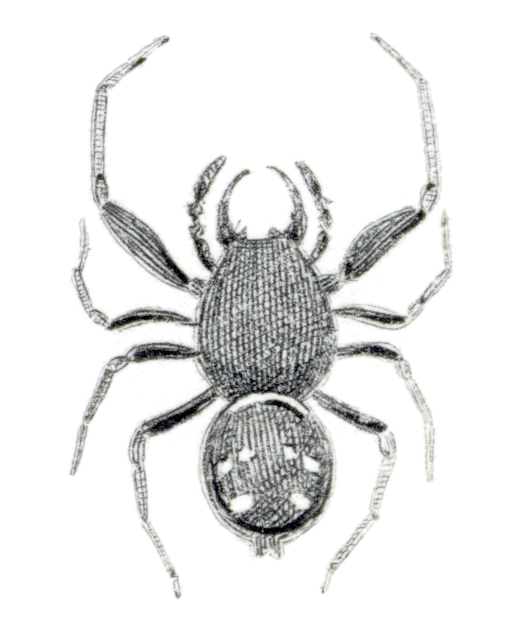
Hentz's original figure of the male

The species was first described by entomologist Nicholas Marcellus Hentz in 1845 in the Boston Journal of Natural History. Hentz named the species Attus sexpunctatus and described it as follows:

"Black; cephalothorax with the two posterior eyes near the base, which is wide and suddenly inclined at nearly a right angle with the upper surface, cheliceres with a strong inner tooth, and a long, curved fang; abdomen with six dots, and a line in front, white; feet, 1. 4. 2. 3., first pair with enlarged thighs and quite long."

Hentz classified A. sexpunctatus in the subgeneric group Pugnatoriae, which consisted of jumping spiders whose first pair of legs were the longest, followed by the fourth pair. Later entomologists abandoned this classification, which Hentz himself admitted was "somewhat artificial". In 1888, with the recognition of Zygoballus as an independent genus, American arachnologists George and Elizabeth Peckham renamed the spider Zygoballus sexpunctatus. Specimens of Z. sexpunctatus are housed at the Museum of Comparative Zoology, the British Museum, the Milwaukee Public Museum, the American Museum of Natural History, and the Muséum National d'Histoire Naturelle. No type specimens are known.

The genus Zygoballus contains approximately twenty species distributed from the United States to Argentina. Zygoballus is classified in the subfamily Salticinae of the family Salticidae (jumping spiders).

== Description ==
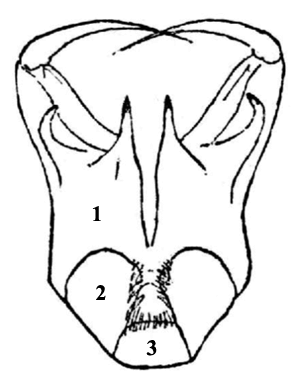
Mouthparts of male (ventral view): 1 = chelicerae, 2 = maxillae, 3 = labium

According to arachnologist B. J. Kaston, adult females are 3.5 to 4.5 mm in body length, while males are 3 to 3.5 mm. The Peckhams' earlier description, however, gives a length of 3 mm for females and 3 to 4.5 mm for males.

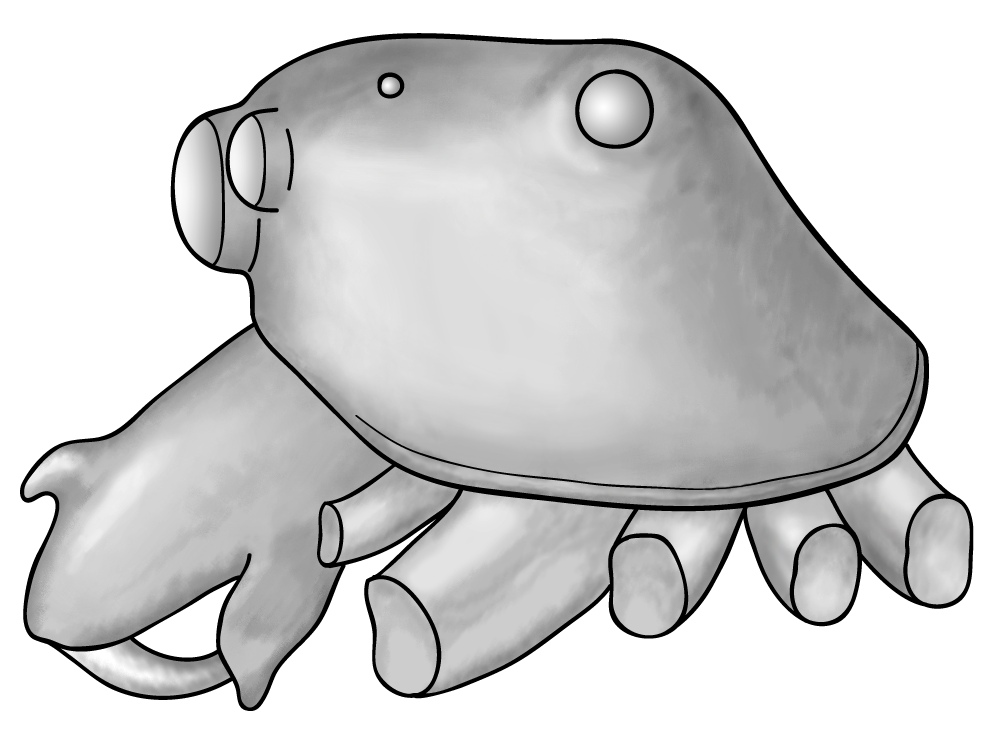
Male carapace and chelicerae (lateral view)

The cephalothorax of Z. sexpunctatus is bronze to black in color. Like all Zygoballus spiders, the cephalothorax is box-like in shape, being widest at the posterior lateral eyes. Numerous white or pale blue scales cover the clypeus ("face") and chelicerae. This covering extends around the sides of the carapace, ending beyond the posterior median eyes. In males, the labium is two-fifths as long as the maxillae, and as wide as it is long. The chelicerae of males are greatly enlarged and obliquely oriented, with each chelicera having a prominent inner tooth and a long, curved fang.

The legs are reddish brown, or sometimes yellowish, with the femora of the anterior (first) pair being darker and enlarged, especially in the male. The anterior legs have three pairs of long spines on the ventral surface of the tibia and two pairs of spines on the metatarsus. The Peckhams give the following measurements for the lengths of the legs of a male specimen, starting with the anterior pair: 3.7 mm, 2.2 mm, 2 mm, 3 mm. In females, the fourth pair of legs are the longest. The pedipalp in the male has a single tibial apophysis which tapers gradually.

The abdomen is bronze to black with a white basal band and two white transverse bands. The transverse bands are often broken to form six spots. Some or all of these spots may be lacking, however.

Zygoballus sexpunctatus is similar in appearance to Zygoballus rufipes, with whom its range overlaps. The male can be distinguished from Z. rufipes by the large spot of white scales at the beginning of the thoracic slope (which is lacking in Z. rufipes), and by the shape of the palpal bulb. The female can best be distinguished by the form of the epigyne (the external genital structure).

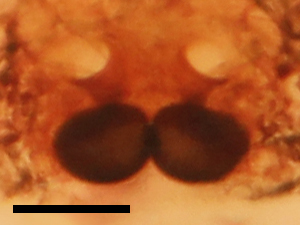
Epigyne (ventral view). Scale equals 0.1 mm.

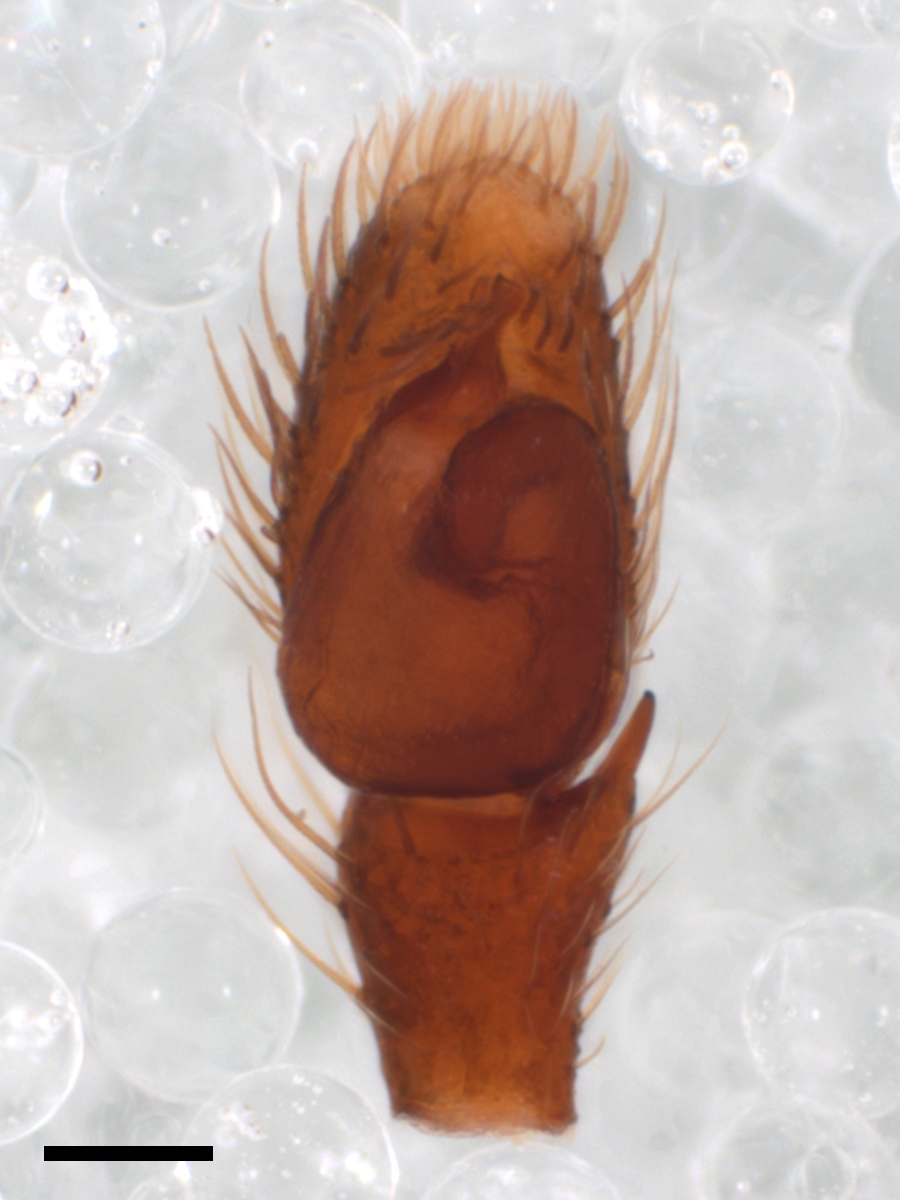
Male pedipalp (ventral view). Scale equals 0.1 mm.

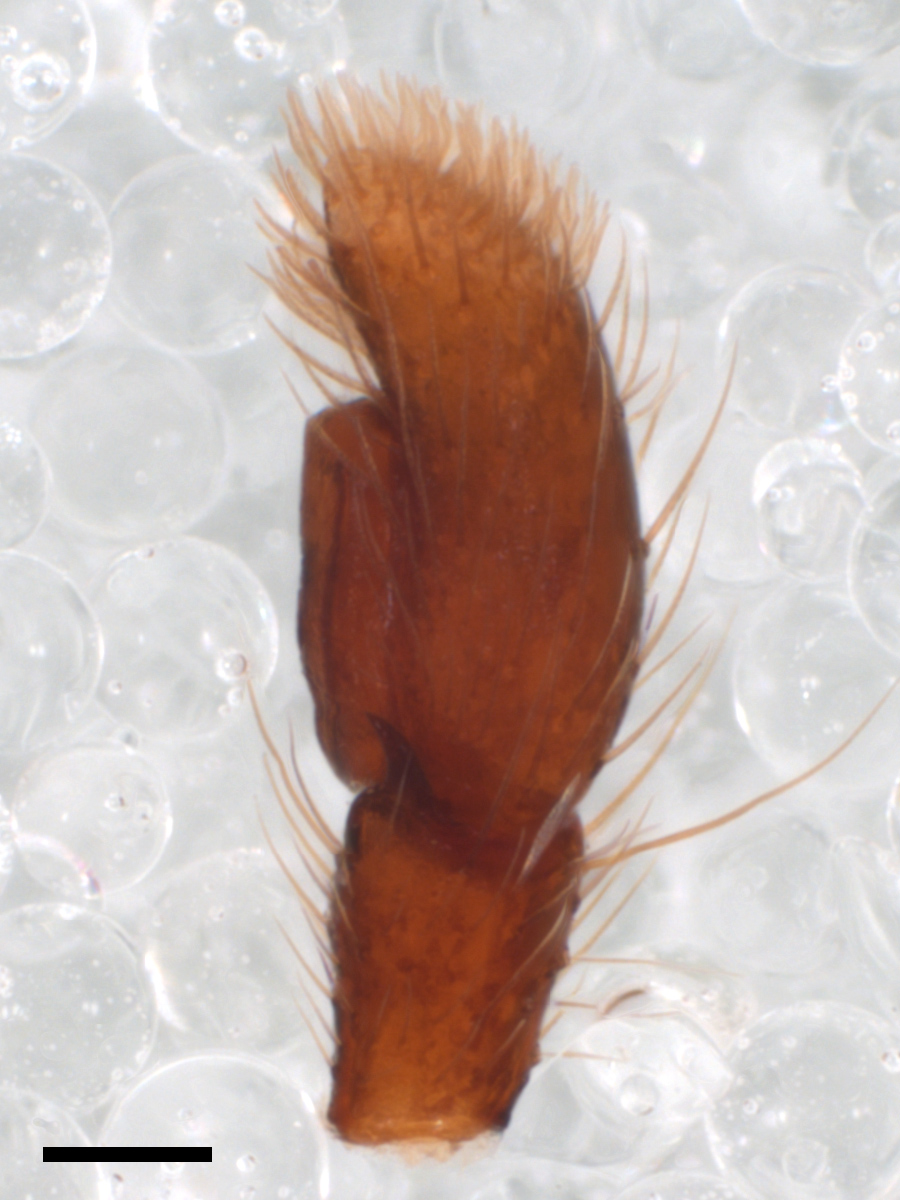
Male pedipalp (lateral view). Scale equals 0.1 mm.

== Habitat and distribution ==
The range of the species extends from New Jersey to Florida and west to Texas, although it is most commonly found in the southern states. Hentz collected his original specimen in North Carolina. In 1909, the Peckhams reported that the species had been collected from North Carolina, Florida, Texas, Louisiana, and Mississippi. A seven-year survey of spider species in western Mississippi reported the abundance of Z. sexpunctatus as "uncommon". A one-year survey in Alachua County, Florida, reported the species as "rare".

Specimens have been collected from several ecosystems, including old fields, river terrace forests, flatwoods, Florida Sand Pine scrub, slash pine forests, Appalachian grass balds, and rice fields. Robert and Betty Barnes reported the species as occurring in broomsedge fields throughout the southeastern Piedmont. The species is typically found in the herb stratum (among grasses and other short plants) and may be collected with a sweep net.

== Behavior ==
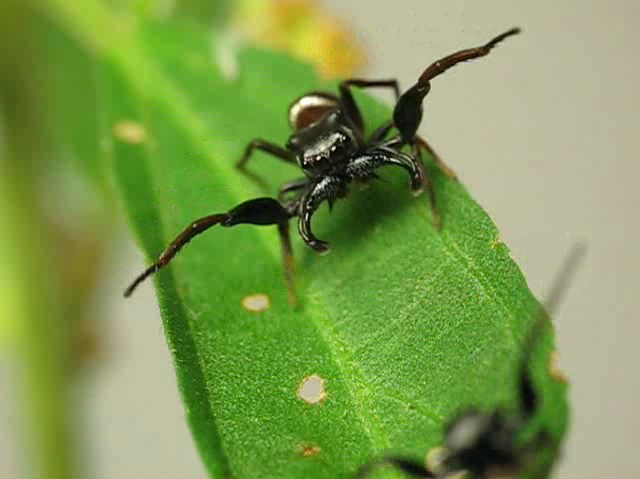
Ritualized agonistic behavior between Z. sexpunctatus males

Male Zygoballus sexpunctatus spiders are known to exhibit elaborate courtship displays. As a male approaches a female, it will typically raise and spread its first pair of legs and vibrate its abdomen. If the female is receptive, it will often vibrate its abdomen as well. The specific patterns of courtship behavior, however, vary between individuals.

Z. sexpunctatus males exhibit ritualized agonistic behavior when encountering other males of the same species. This behavior may include many of the same elements as courtship, such as raising and spreading the first pair of legs and vibrating the abdomen. During agonistic display, males will also extend their pedipalps and fangs. Lethal attacks between males appear to be rare, however.

== Diet and ecology ==
Like most spiders, Zygoballus sexpunctatus is an opportunistic feeder, feeding on a wide range of invertebrate prey. The spider's diet typically includes small insects such as aphids and young caterpillars. They have also been known to eat mosquitoes and numerous kinds of small spiders.

Mud dauber wasps, which capture and paralyze spiders as a source of food for their larvae, have been shown to prey on both male and female Z. sexpunctatus spiders.

== Life cycle ==
In a study of spider populations in western Tennessee, Zygoballus sexpunctatus spiderlings were reported to hatch from egg sacs in mid summer. The spiders hibernated through the winter in an immature form and reached sexual maturity around late April.

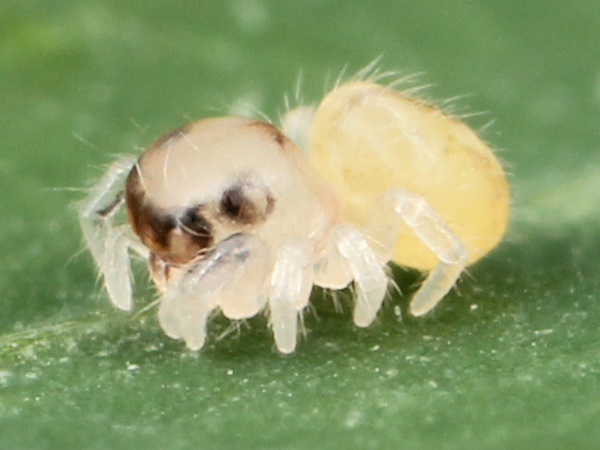
Larval stage

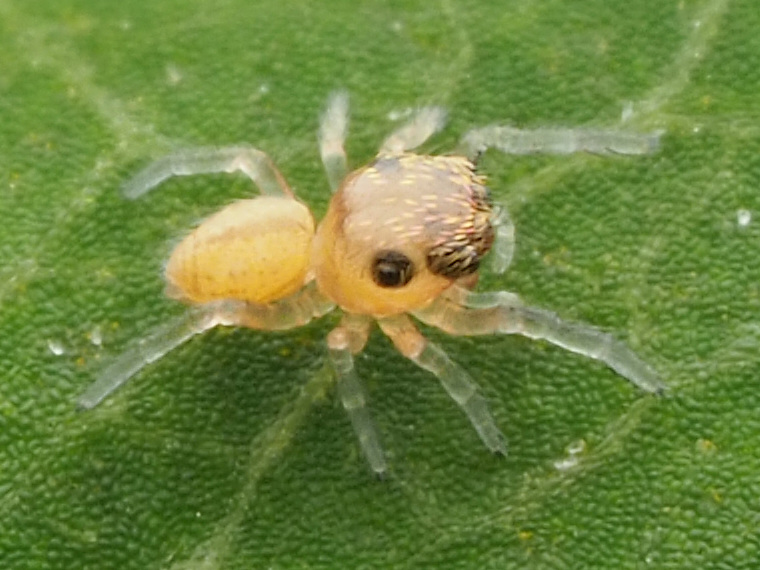
First instar

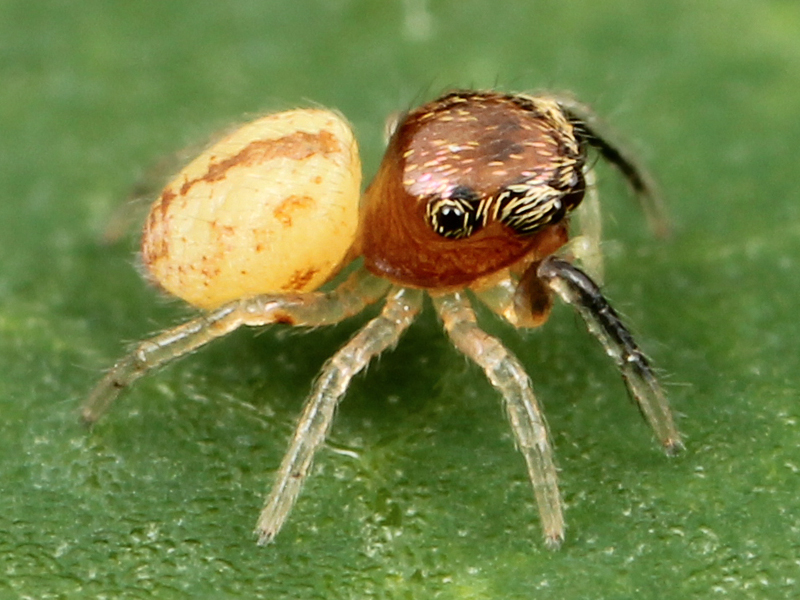
Immature male

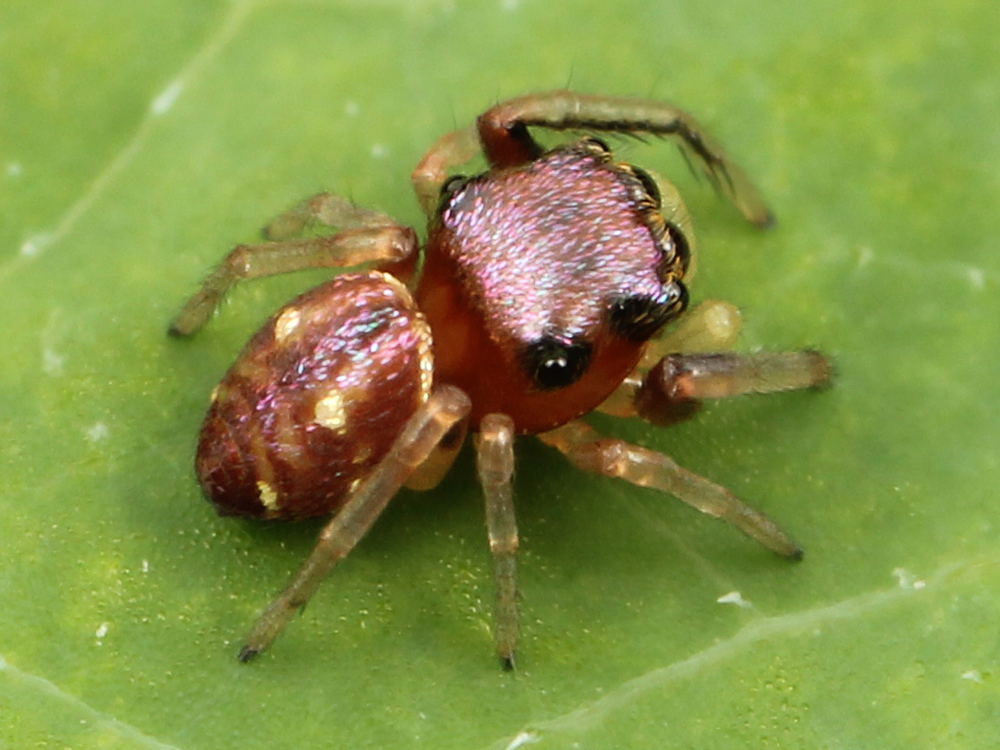
Immature male

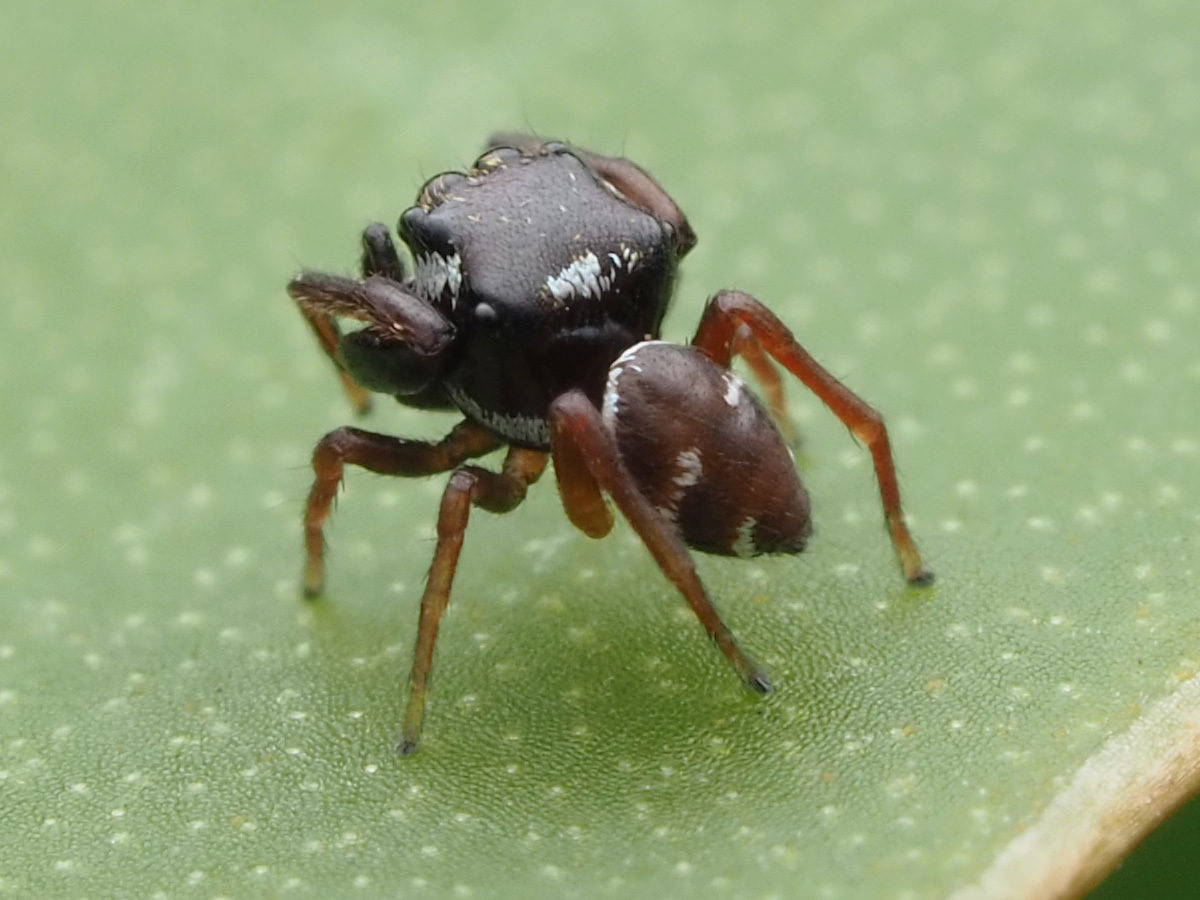
Adult male
