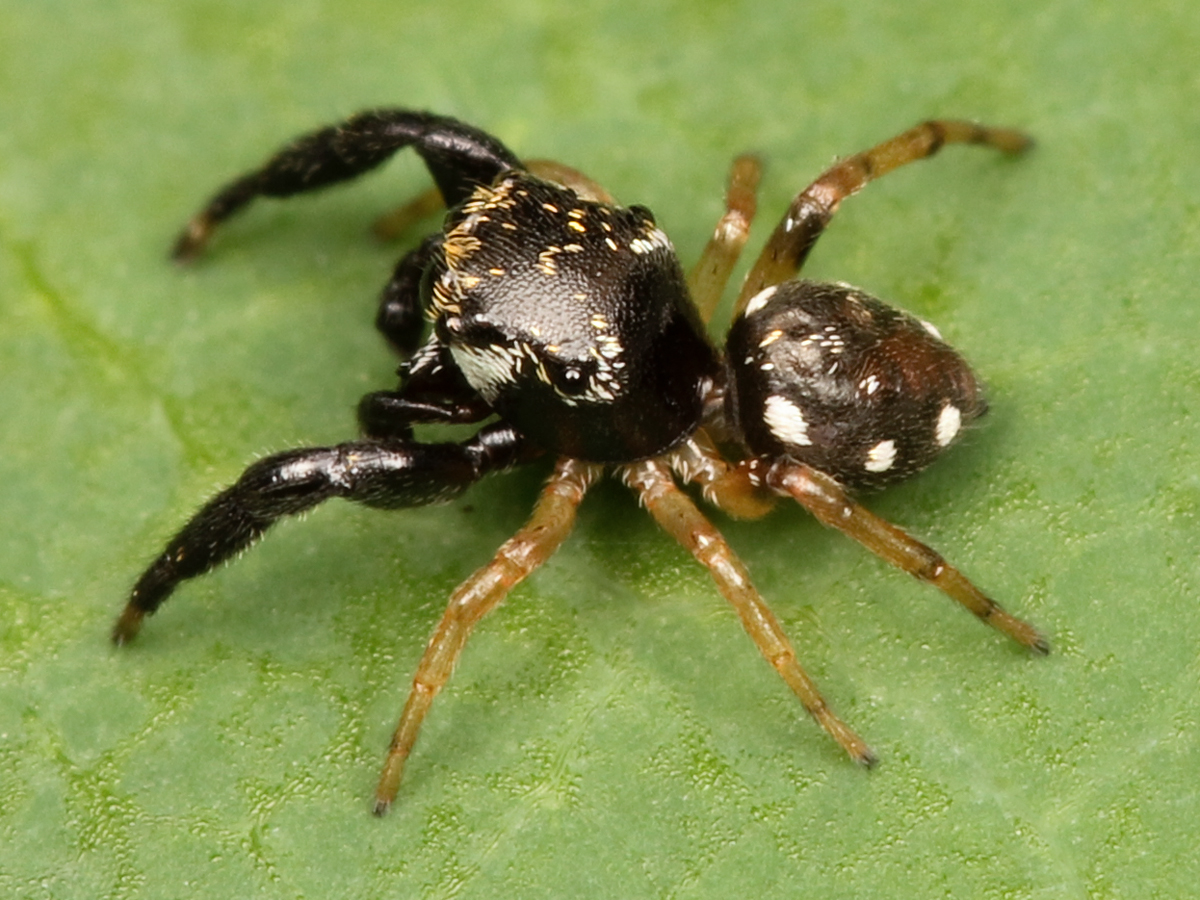
- Male

Scientific classification
- Kingdom: Animalia
- Phylum: Arthropoda
- Subphylum: Chelicerata
- Class: Arachnida
- Order: Araneae
- Infraorder: Araneomorphae
- Family: Salticidae
- Genus: Zygoballus
- Species: Z. tibialis

Binomial name
- Zygoballus tibialis F. O. P.-Cambridge, 1901

= Zygoballus tibialis =

Species of spider

Zygoballus tibialis is a species of jumping spider native to Central America. It was first described by the arachnologist Frederick Octavius Pickard-Cambridge in 1901. The type specimens are housed at the Natural History Museum in London.

The species has been collected from Mexico (Chiapas), Guatemala, Costa Rica, and possibly Panama.

== Description ==
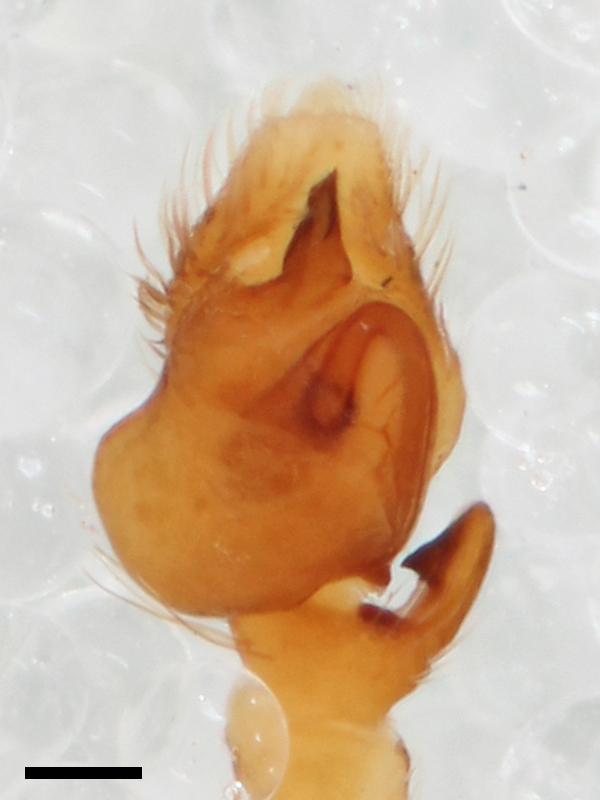
Pedipalp of the male holotype

According to the arachnologist Frederick Octavius Pickard-Cambridge, males are approximately 3 mm in body length, while females are approximately 4 mm. The male can be distinguished from other Central American Zygoballus by its large tibial apophysis (or "spur") on the pedipalp. In the male, the first pair of legs and the pedipalps are black while the other legs are yellow. In the female, the legs are annulated with black at the apex of the segments, and the abdomen has a pattern of white spots and bands. The female can be distinguished from closely related species by the shape of the epigyne.
