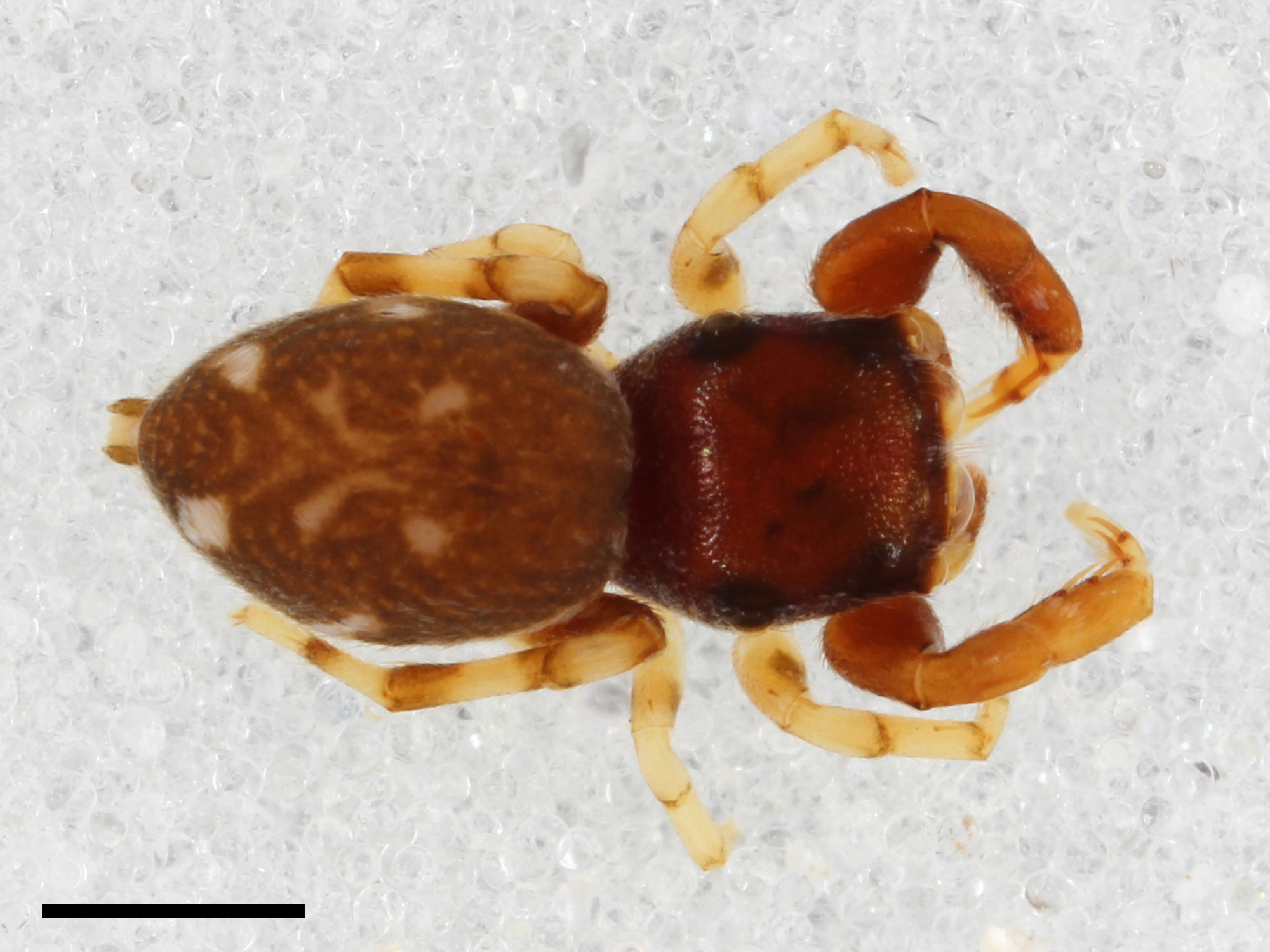
- Female holotype

Scientific classification
- Kingdom: Animalia
- Phylum: Arthropoda
- Subphylum: Chelicerata
- Class: Arachnida
- Order: Araneae
- Infraorder: Araneomorphae
- Family: Salticidae
- Genus: Zygoballus
- Species: Z. maculatus

Binomial name
- Zygoballus maculatus F. O. P-Cambridge, 1901

= Zygoballus maculatus =

Species of spider

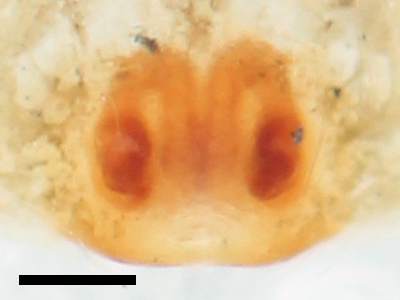
Epigyne of Zygoballus maculatus holotype

Zygoballus maculatus is a species of jumping spider which occurs in Guatemala. It is known only from a single female specimen held at the Natural History Museum, London. The species was first described in 1901 by the English arachnologist Frederick Octavius Pickard-Cambridge:

Zygoballus maculatus, sp. n.
Type, female, in coll. Godman and Salvin. Total length 3 millim.
Hab. Guatemala (Sarg).
This species is black, with a few white dorsal and marginal spots on the abdomen, and the legs i. brown, and ii., iii., and iv. yellow, annulated with black. It is probably recognizable by the form of the vulva only, for the coloration in these spiders is very variable, the general pattern being common to many of them.
