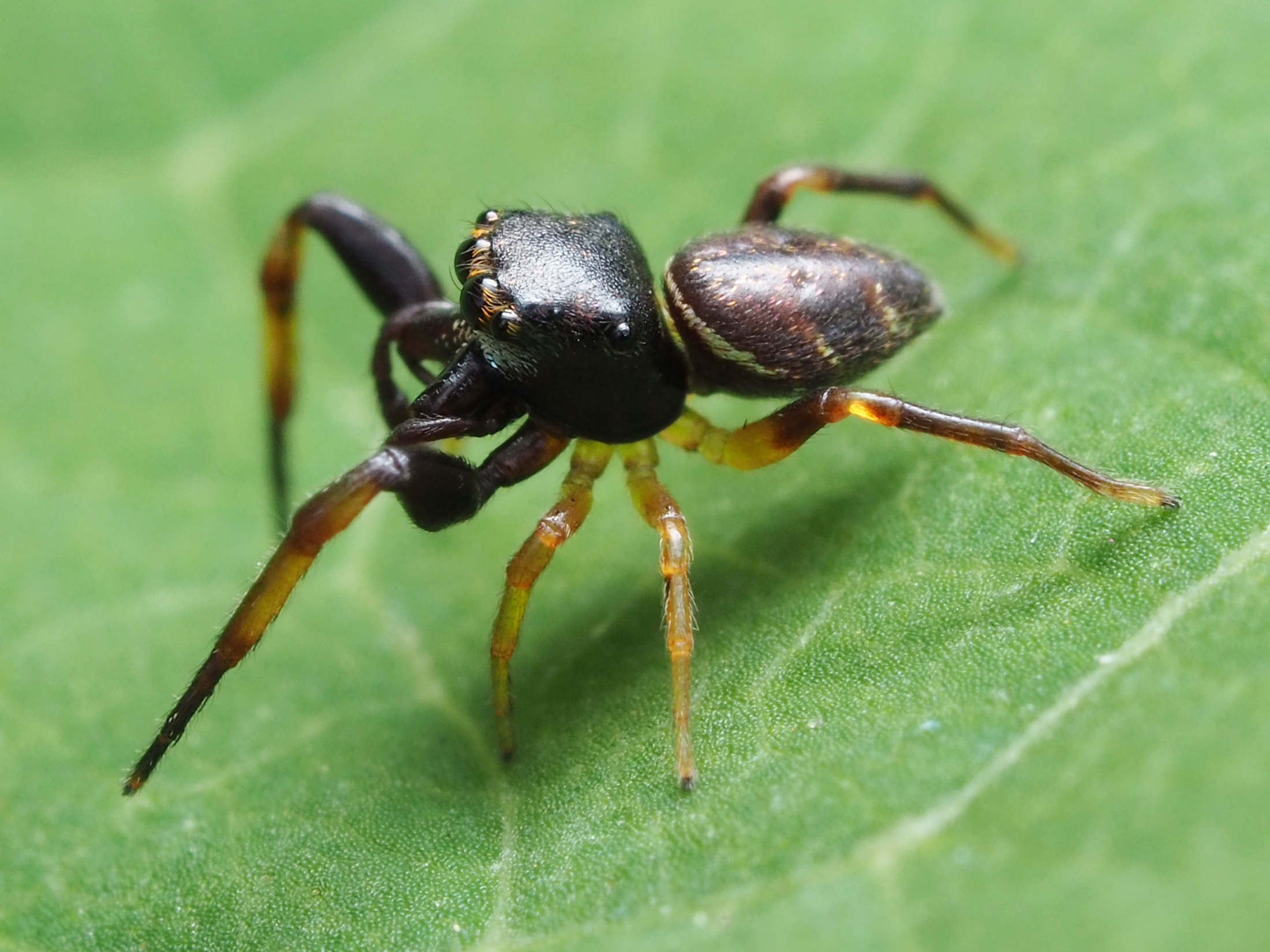
- Male
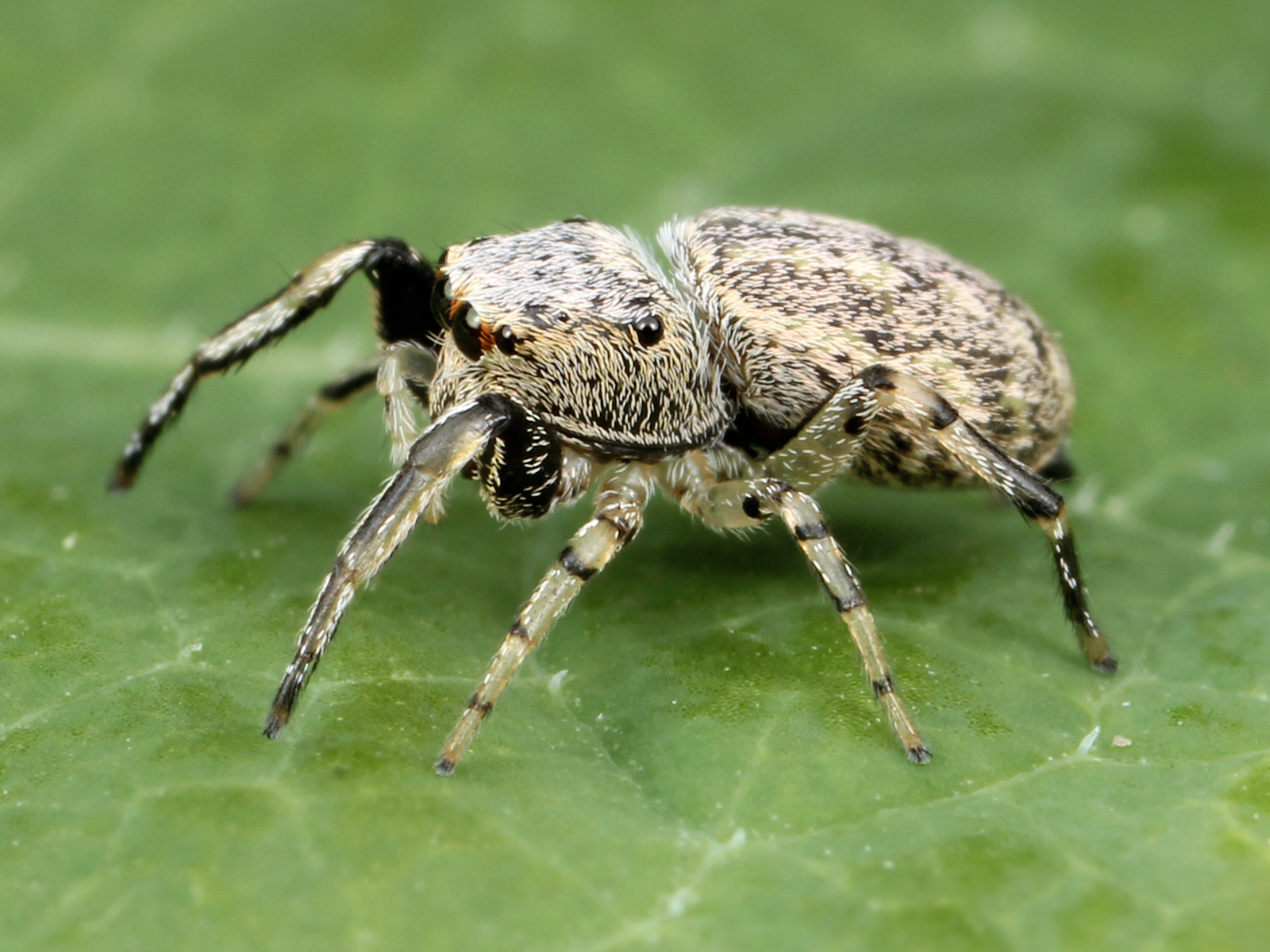
- Female

Scientific classification
- Kingdom: Animalia
- Phylum: Arthropoda
- Subphylum: Chelicerata
- Class: Arachnida
- Order: Araneae
- Infraorder: Araneomorphae
- Family: Salticidae
- Genus: Zygoballus
- Species: Z. rufipes

Binomial name
- Zygoballus rufipes Peckham & Peckham, 1885

Synonyms
- Zygoballus bettini Peckham & Peckham, 1888; Zygoballus strenuus Peckham & Peckham, 1896; Rhane munda O. Pickard-Cambridge, 1896; Eris bettini (Peckham & Peckham, 1888)

= Zygoballus rufipes =

Species of spider

Zygoballus rufipes, commonly called the hammerjawed jumper, is a species of jumping spider which occurs in the United States, Canada, and Central America. Adult females are 4.3 to 6 mm in body length, while males are 3 to 4 mm.

== Taxonomy ==
The species was first described in 1885 by George and Elizabeth Peckham from a specimen in Guatemala. The Peckhams subsequently described the northern variant as a separate species, Z. bettini, in 1888. In 1980, after examining specimens of Z. bettini and Z. rufipes from various populations, G. B. Edwards concluded that the differences mentioned by the Peckhams were not consistently distinct and that the two names represented a single species of variable appearance. The two names were therefore synonymized. The genus Zygoballus is currently classified in the subfamily Salticinae of the family Salticidae (jumping spiders).

== Distribution ==
Zygoballus rufipes has been reported from Canada, the United States, Mexico, Guatemala, and Costa Rica. In 1929, entomologist Nathan Banks reported a female specimen from Panama. In 1946, however, arachnologist Arthur M. Chickering concluded that Banks' specimen belonged to the newly described species, Zygoballus optatus. Chickering himself found no specimens of Z. rufipes in Panama after collecting there for several years. A one-year survey of Panamanian spiders conducted by zoologist Wolfgang Nentwig also failed to yield the species.

== Images ==
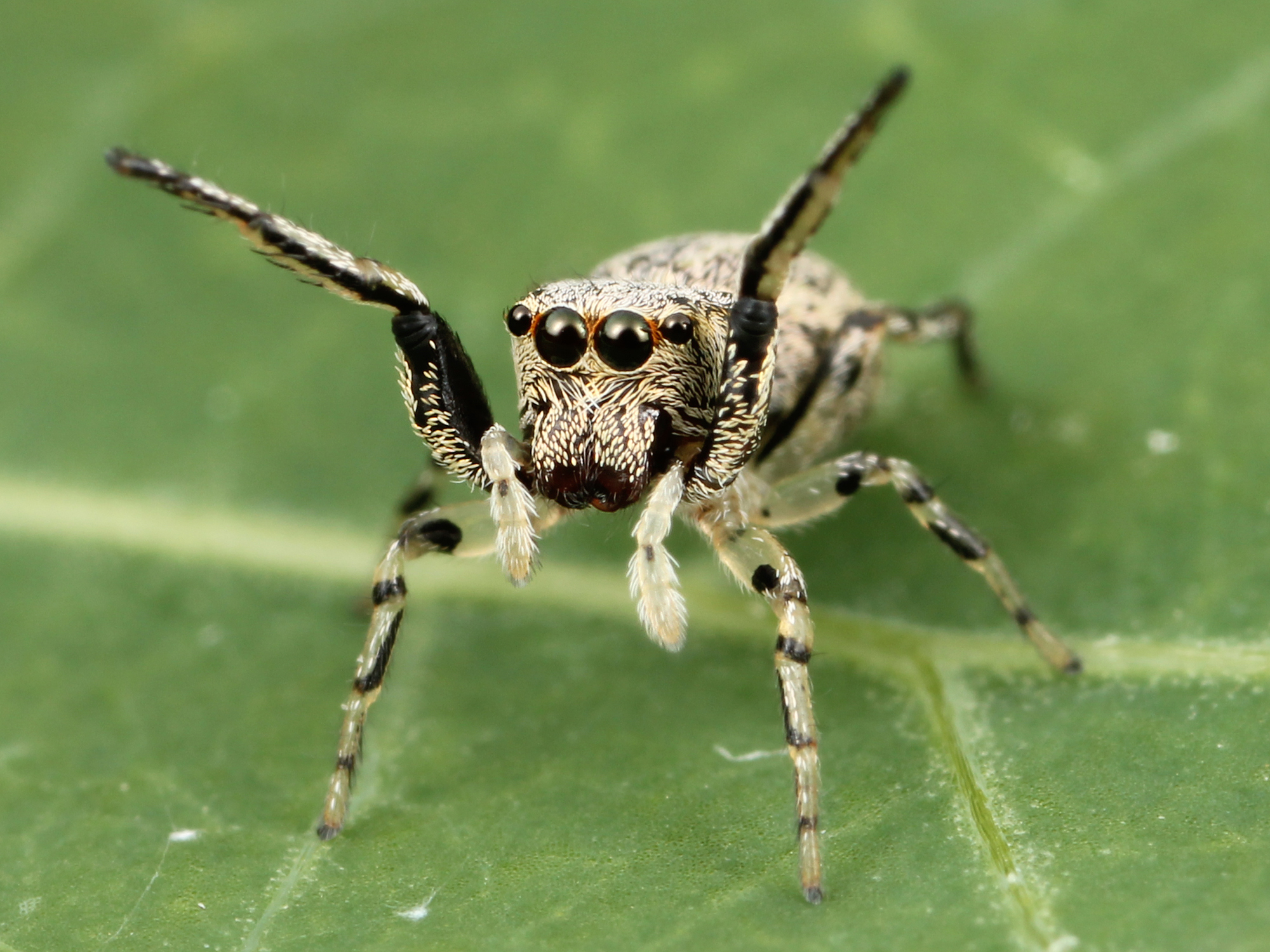
Female

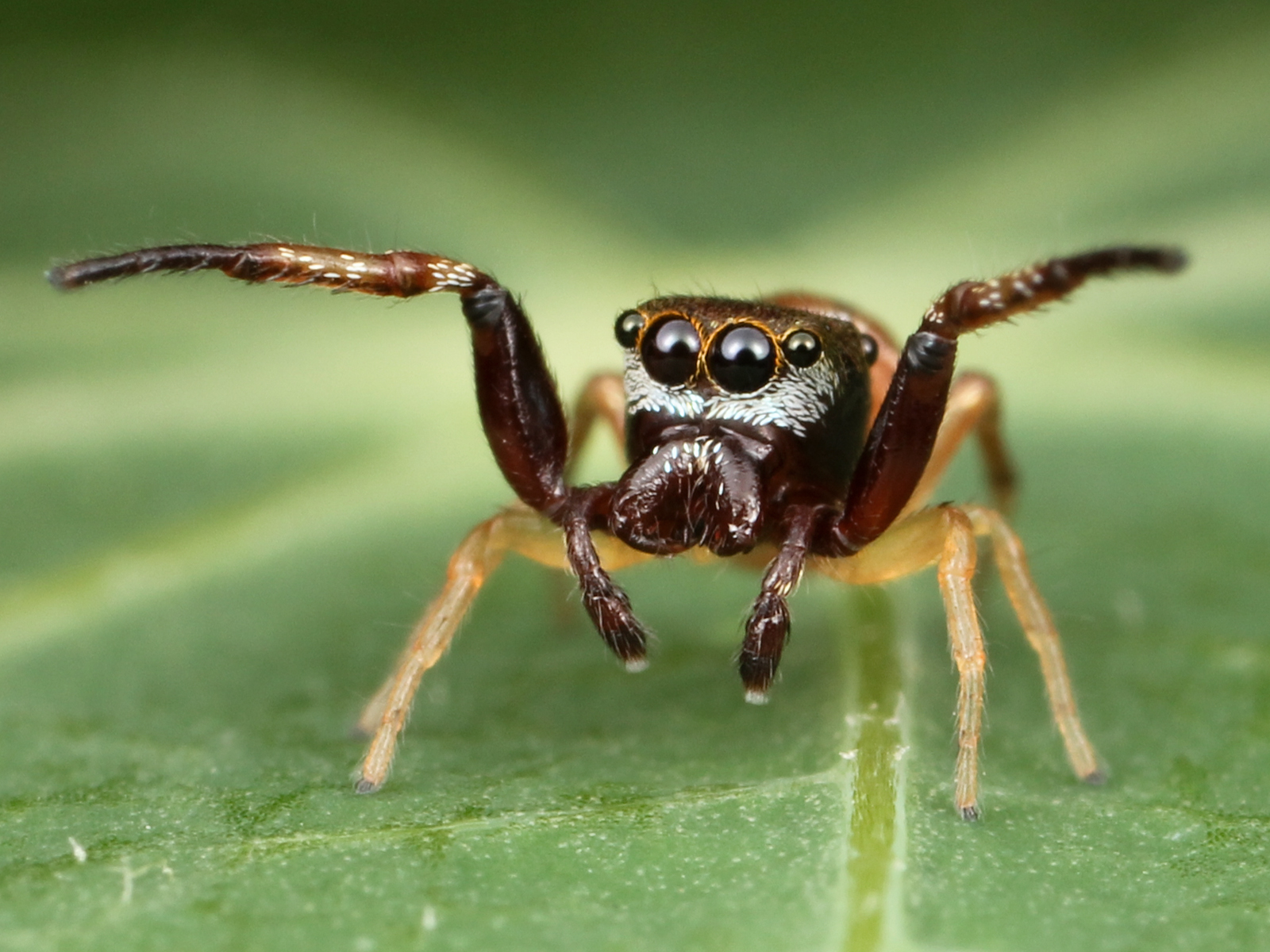
Male

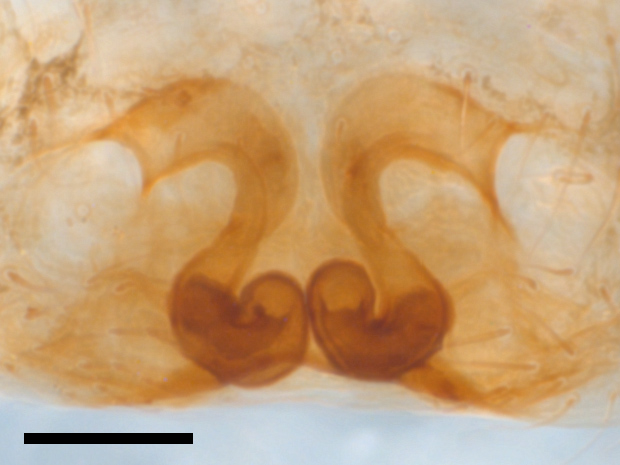
Epigyne

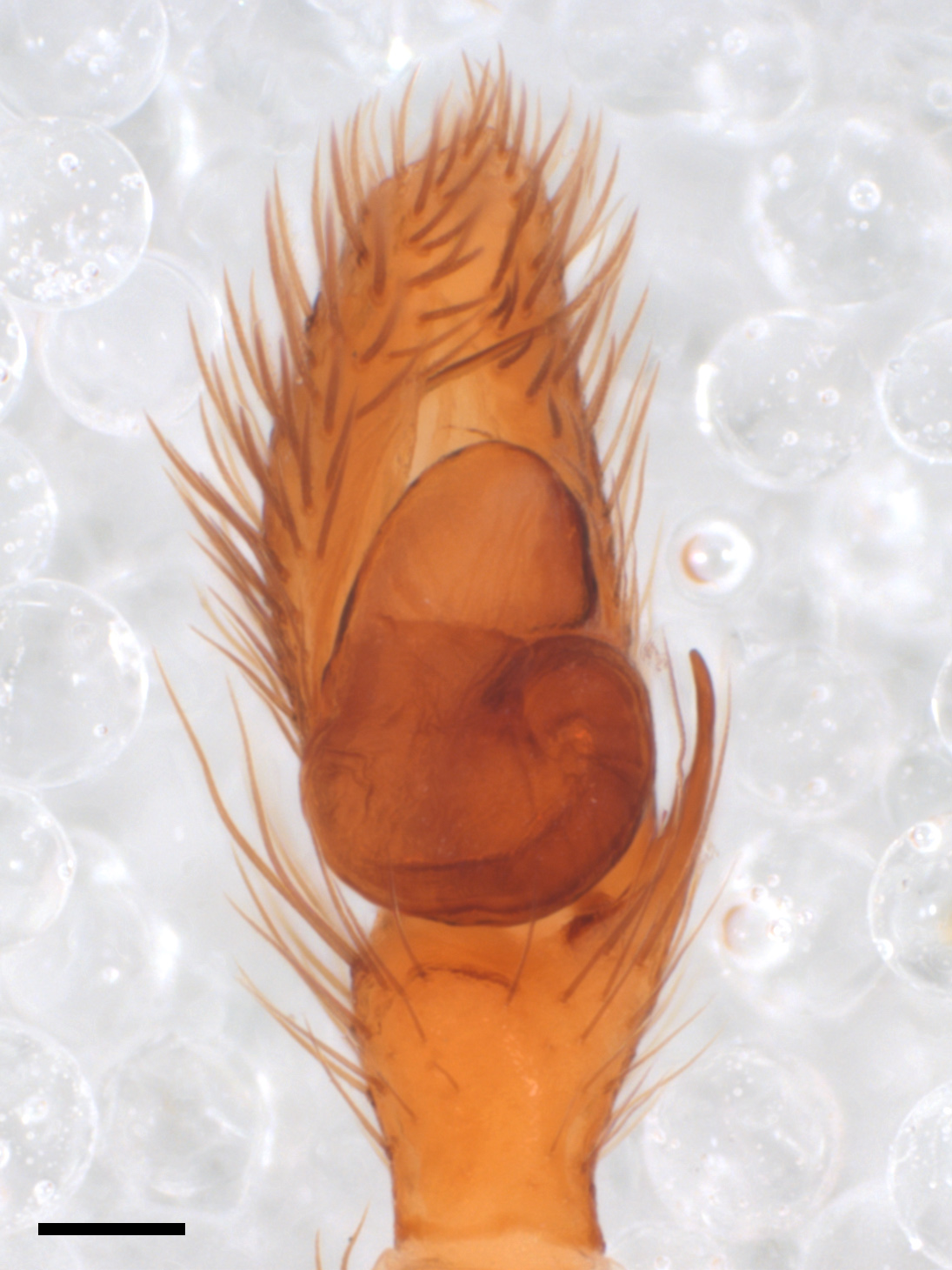
Male pedipalp
