= Aurantius =

Aurantius may refer to:

- Conus aurantius, species of sea snail in the family Conidae
- Costemilophus aurantius, species of beetle in the family Cerambycidae
- Cystiscus aurantius, species of very small sea snail in the family Cystiscidae
- Fusus aurantius, species of sea snail in the family Fasciolariidae
- Paraphidippus aurantius, species of jumping spider, known as the golden jumping spider
- Polinices aurantius, species of predatory sea snail in the family Naticidae
- Rugathodes aurantius, species of cobweb spider in the family Theridiidae
- Sceloporus aurantius, the southern occidental bunchgrass lizard, a species of phrynosomatid lizard
