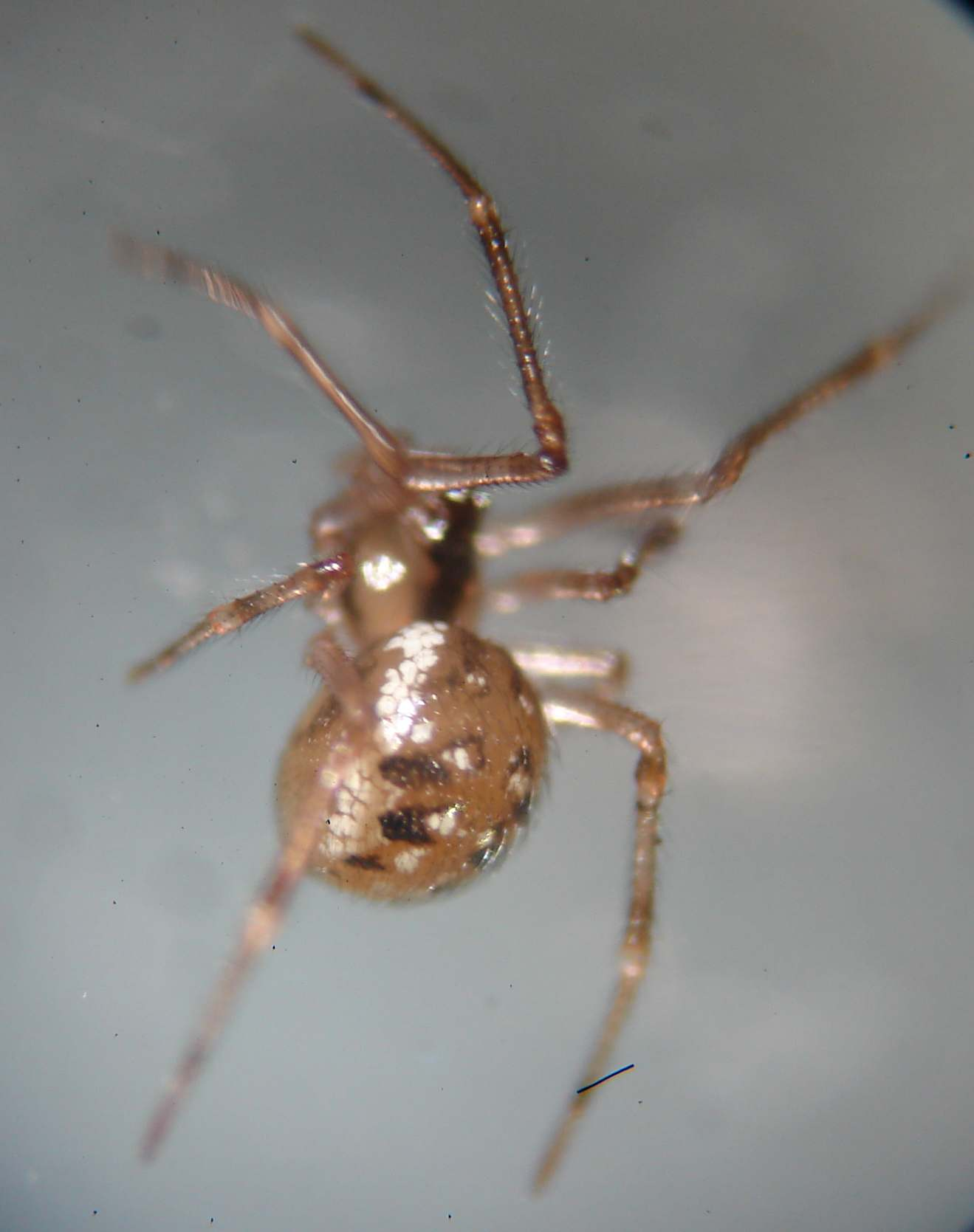
- Rugathodes sexpunctatus, female

Scientific classification
- Kingdom: Animalia
- Phylum: Arthropoda
- Subphylum: Chelicerata
- Class: Arachnida
- Order: Araneae
- Infraorder: Araneomorphae
- Family: Theridiidae
- Genus: Rugathodes; Archer, 1950

Type species
- R. sexpunctatus (Emerton, 1882)

Species
- 8, see text

= Rugathodes =

Genus of spiders

Rugathodes is a genus of comb-footed spiders that was first described by Allan Frost Archer in 1950. It is closely related to members of Theridion and Wamba.

== Species ==
As of June 2020 it contains eight species with a mostly paleotropical distribution:

- Rugathodes acoreensis Wunderlich, 1992 – Azores
- Rugathodes aurantius (Emerton, 1915) – North America, Russia (Europe to Far East), Kazakhstan
- Rugathodes bellicosus (Simon, 1873) – Europe, Russia (Europe to South Siberia)
- Rugathodes instabilis (O. Pickard-Cambridge, 1871) – Europe, Russia (Europe to West Siberia)
- Rugathodes madeirensis Wunderlich, 1987 – Madeira
- Rugathodes nigrolimbatus (Yaginuma, 1972) – Japan
- Rugathodes pico (Merrett & Ashmole, 1989) – Azores
- Rugathodes sexpunctatus (Emerton, 1882) (type) – USA, Canada, Russia (Commander Is.). Introduced to Britain

In synonymy:

- R. lowriei (Barrows, 1945) = Rugathodes aurantius (Emerton, 1915)
