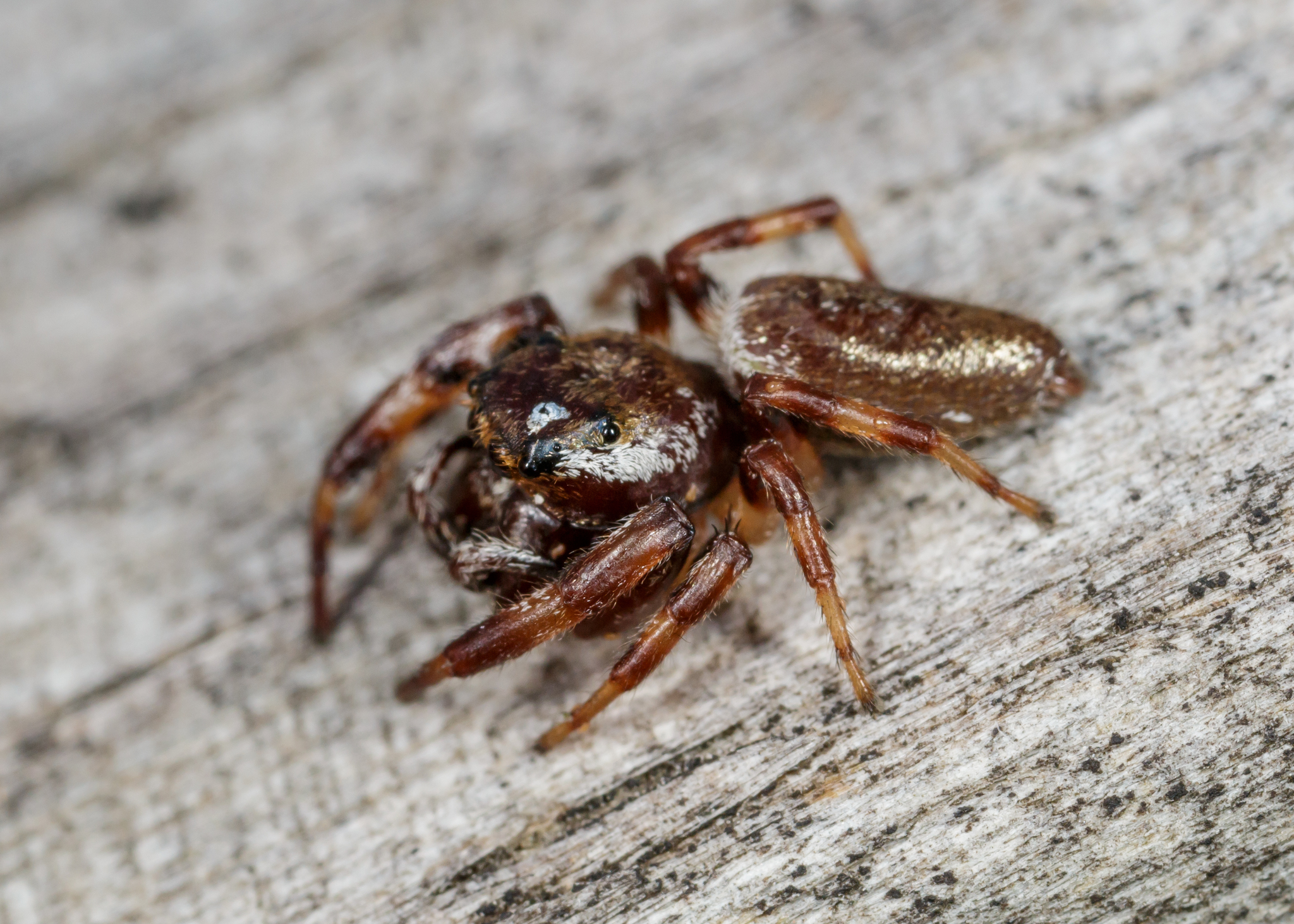
- male

Scientific classification
- Kingdom: Animalia
- Phylum: Arthropoda
- Subphylum: Chelicerata
- Class: Arachnida
- Order: Araneae
- Infraorder: Araneomorphae
- Family: Salticidae
- Genus: Eris
- Species: E. rufa

Binomial name
- Eris rufa (C. L. Koch, 1846)

Synonyms
- Plexippus rufus C. L. Koch, 1846; Paraphidippus pineus Kaston, 1945; Dendryphantes pineus (Kaston, 1945); Eris pinea (Kaston, 1945); Eris pineus (Kaston, 1945)

= Eris rufa =

- female (1846 drawing)

Species of jumping spider

Eris rufa is a species of jumping spider. It is found in Canada and the United States.

== Taxonomy ==
The species was originally described by Carl Ludwig Koch in 1846 as Plexippus rufus. The specific name rufa is Latin for "red" or "reddish", likely referring to the spider's coloration.

In 1945, B. J. Kaston described what he considered a new species, Paraphidippus pineus, based on specimens from Connecticut. This species was later transferred to the genus Eris as Eris pinea. However, in 2004, G. B. Edwards determined that Eris pinea was actually a junior synonym of Plexippus rufus, transferring the latter to Eris as Eris rufa and synonymizing the two names.

== Distribution ==
Eris rufa has been recorded from Canada and the United States (Connecticut, Massachusetts, and other north-eastern states).

== Description ==
The female of Eris rufa has a total body length of approximately 5.9 mm, with the cephalothorax measuring 2.4 mm long and 1.6 mm wide. The carapace is narrower than in males and generally lighter in coloration. The overall color is brown, with white hairs distributed over the carapace, particularly on the clypeus and in patches between the rear eyes. The legs are marked similarly to males but are lighter in coloration. The opisthosoma is light orange above and yellow beneath.

The male has a total length of 5.7 mm, with the cephalothorax measuring 2.62 mm long and 2.15 mm wide, and the opisthosoma 3 mm long and 1.7 mm wide. The species resembles other members of its genus, with the carapace brown above and darker along the sides and posterior declivity. There is a curved band of white scales extending from the anterior lateral eyes, under the small eyes, and onto the declivity. The opisthosoma has a thin basal white line, with the remainder being gray-brown with iridescent scales.

The legs show distinctive coloration patterns. The first leg's femur is dark brown except at the distal end where it is yellow, while the proximal half of the patella and tibia are light brown and the distal half is blackish brown. The metatarsus and tarsus are evenly brown. There is a weak fringe of white hairs under the patella and tibia.

The male pedipalps have distinctive features, with the patella slightly longer than the tibia, which bears an apophysis that is longer than but not as curved as in related species. The embolus is shorter and arises farther from the retrolateral border compared to similar species.
