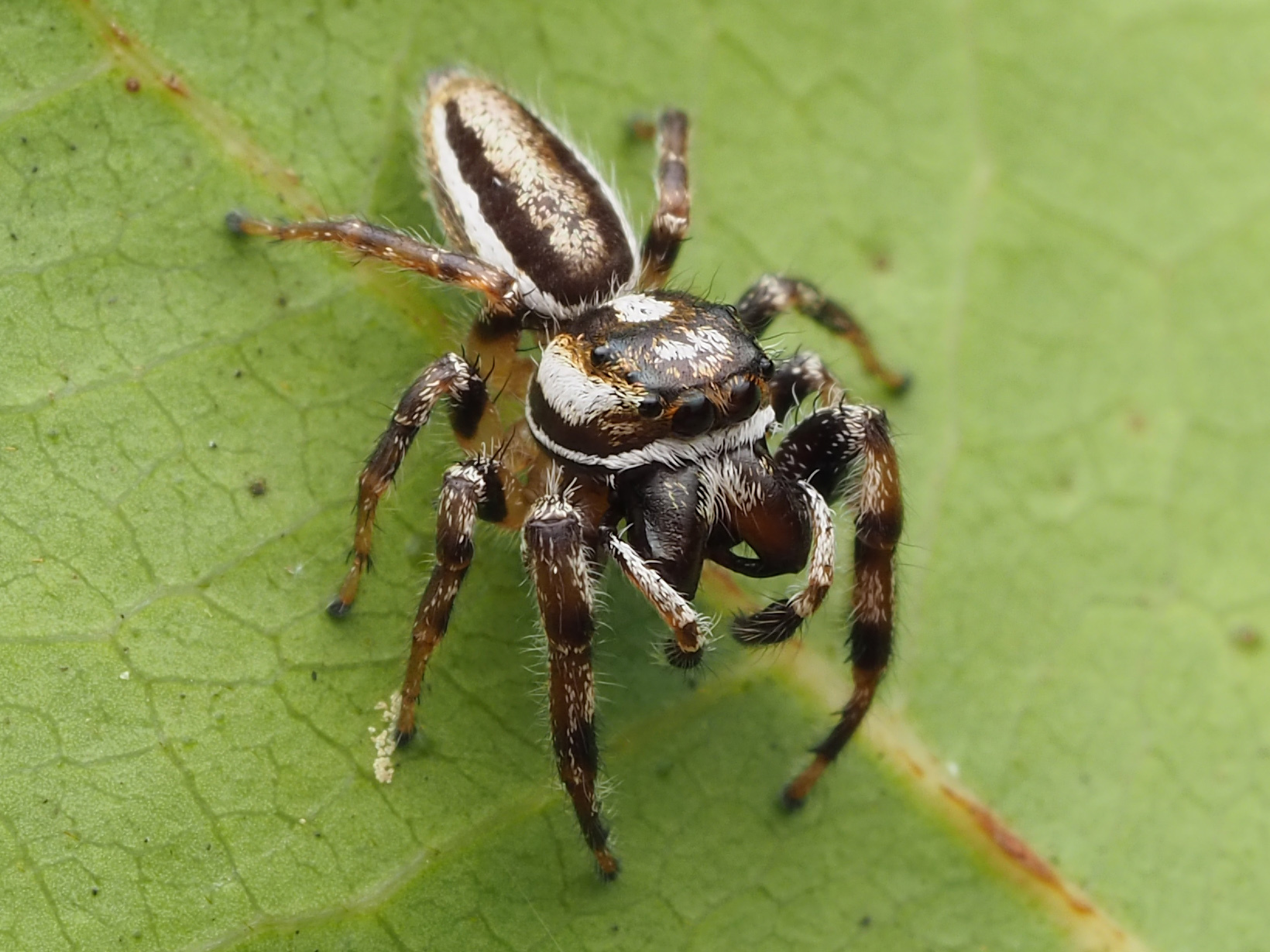
- Male in Florida
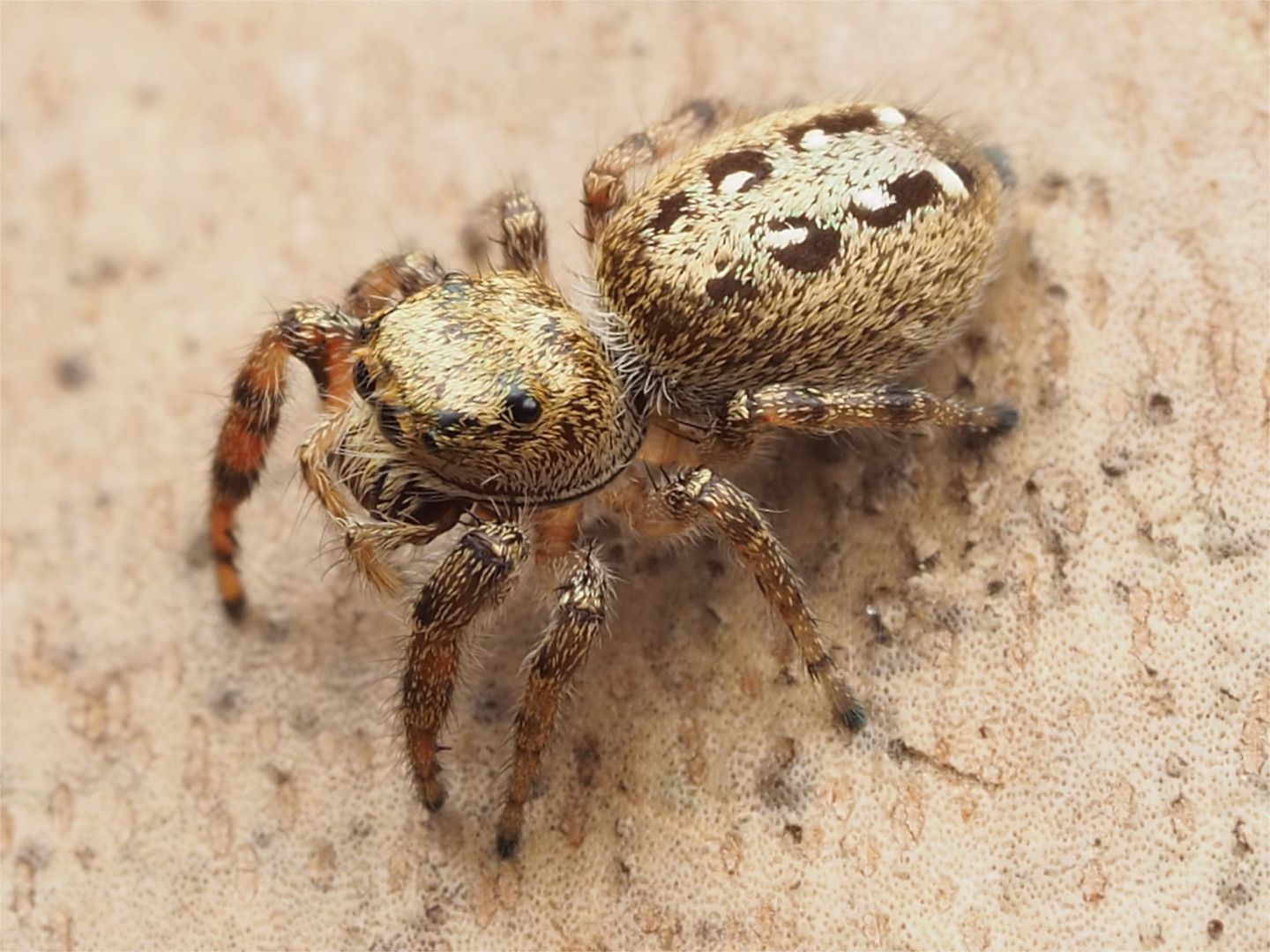
- Female in Florida

Scientific classification
- Kingdom: Animalia
- Phylum: Arthropoda
- Subphylum: Chelicerata
- Class: Arachnida
- Order: Araneae
- Infraorder: Araneomorphae
- Family: Salticidae
- Genus: Eris
- Species: E. flava

Binomial name
- Eris flava (Peckham & Peckham, 1888)

= Eris flava =

Species of spider

Eris flava is a species of jumping spider. It is found in the eastern United States, Cuba, Jamaica, and Hispaniola. The male can be distinguished from Eris militaris by its band of white scales across the clypeus.
