= Paraphidippus nigropilosus =

Scientific classification
- Kingdom: Animalia
- Phylum: Arthropoda
- Subphylum: Chelicerata
- Class: Arachnida
- Order: Araneae
- Infraorder: Araneomorphae
- Family: Salticidae
- Genus: Paraphidippus
- Species: P. nigropilosus

Binomial name
- Paraphidippus nigropilosus (Banks, 1898)

Species of spider

Paraphidippus nigropilosus is a species of jumping spider in the genus Paraphidippus. The species is endemic to Mexico and was officially described by Nathan Banks in 1898. The specific epithet refers to the black hairs on the tibia and tarsi (Latin: nigro = black and pilōsus = hairy).
