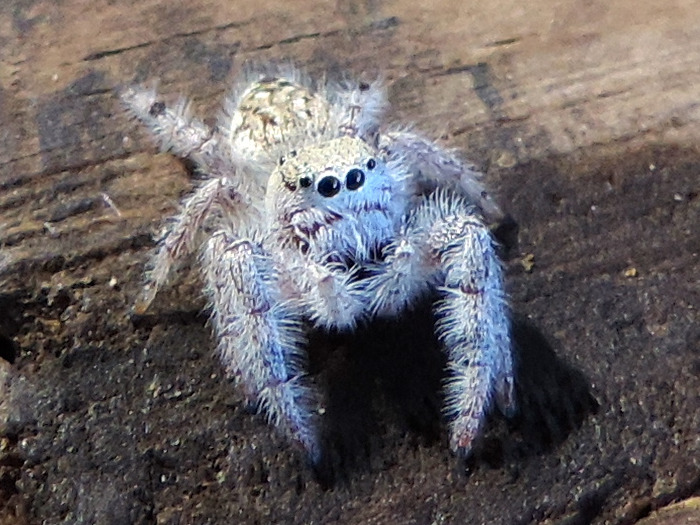
- Female near Mazatlán, Mexico
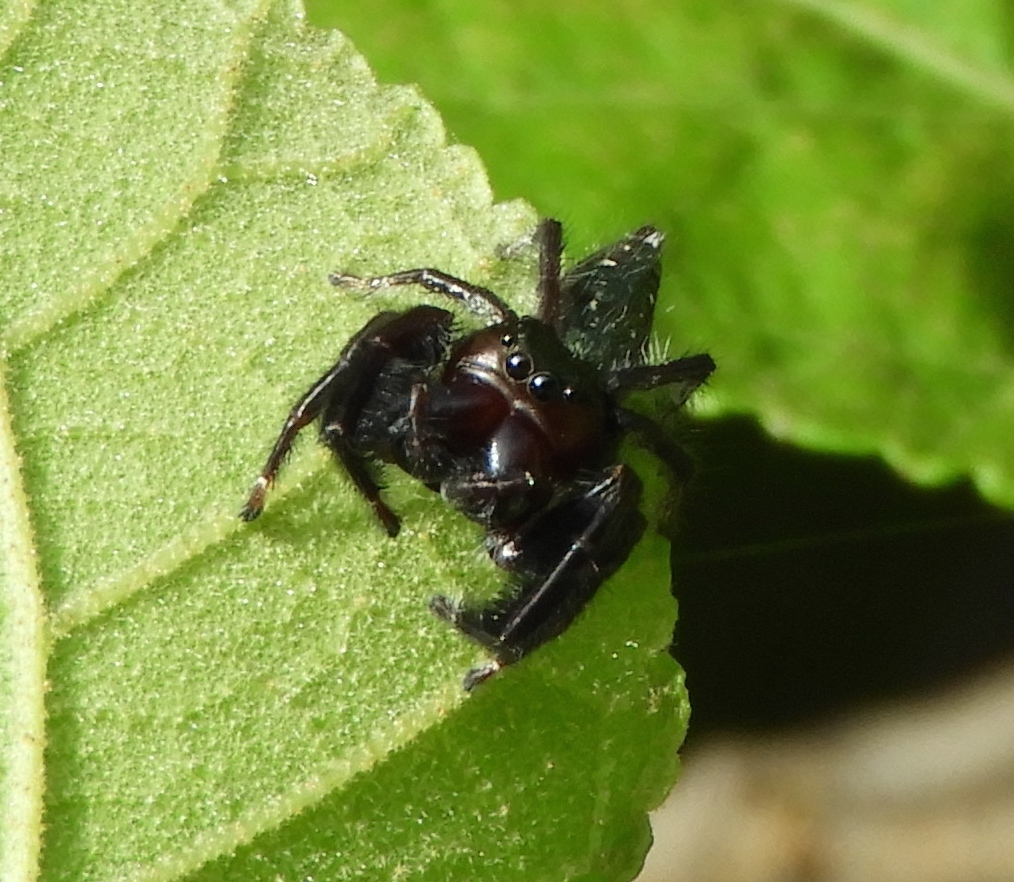
- Male near Mazatlán, Mexico

Scientific classification
- Kingdom: Animalia
- Phylum: Arthropoda
- Subphylum: Chelicerata
- Class: Arachnida
- Order: Araneae
- Infraorder: Araneomorphae
- Family: Salticidae
- Genus: Paraphidippus
- Species: P. fartilis

Binomial name
- Paraphidippus fartilis (Peckham & Peckham, 1888)

= Paraphidippus fartilis =

Species of arachnid

Paraphidippus fartilis is a species of jumping spider.

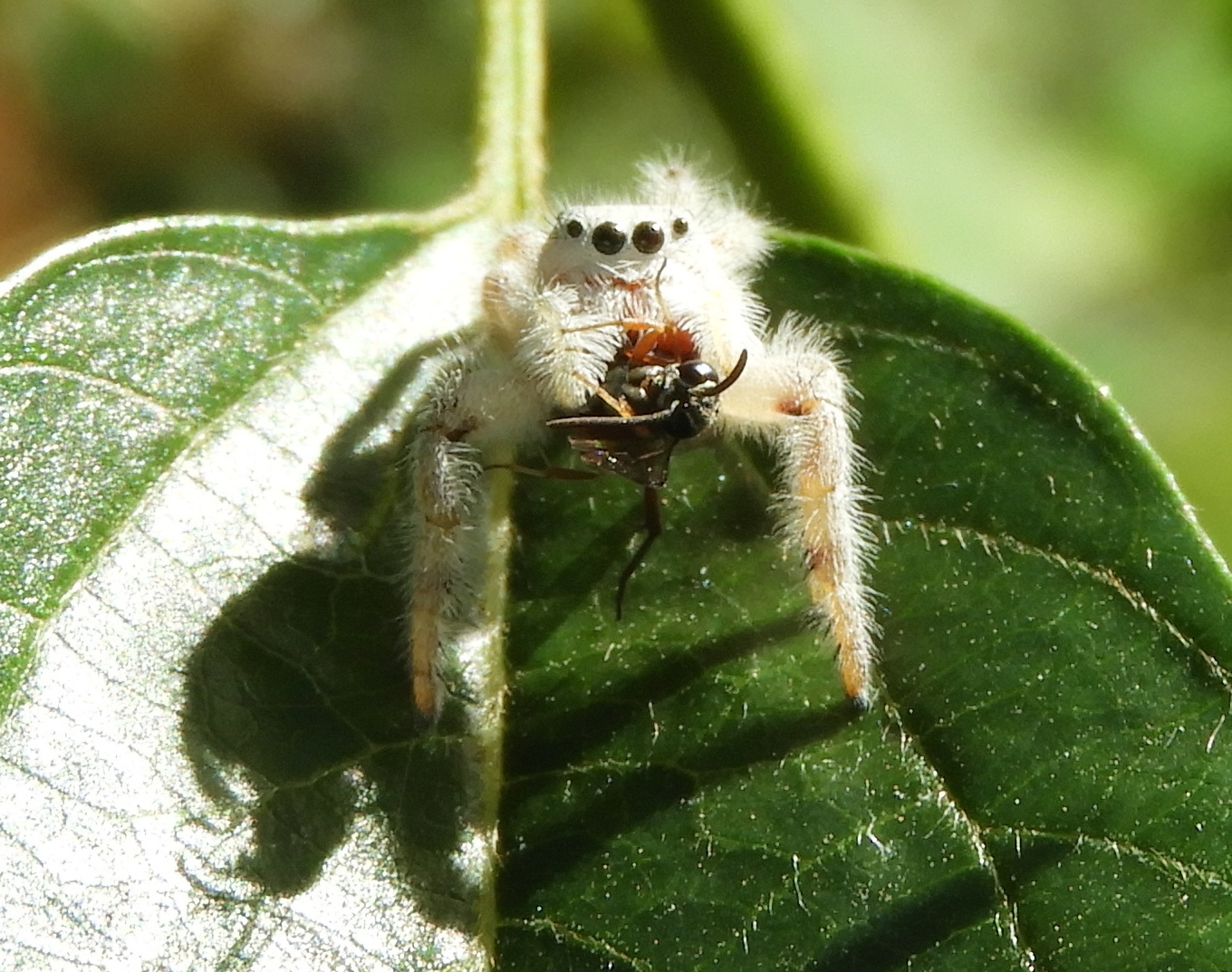
Eating a fly

== Range ==
It has a range from Texas, through Baja California Sur and southern Mexico down to Panama.
