= Wamba panamensis =

Scientific classification
- Domain: Eukaryota
- Kingdom: Animalia
- Phylum: Arthropoda
- Subphylum: Chelicerata
- Class: Arachnida
- Order: Araneae
- Infraorder: Araneomorphae
- Family: Theridiidae
- Genus: Wamba
- Species: W. panamensis

Binomial name
- Wamba panamensis (Levi, 1959)

Species of spider

Wamba panamensis is a species of comb-footed spider in the family Theridiidae. It is found in Panama and Ecuador.
