= Rugathodes bellicosus =

Scientific classification
- Kingdom: Animalia
- Phylum: Arthropoda
- Subphylum: Chelicerata
- Class: Arachnida
- Order: Araneae
- Infraorder: Araneomorphae
- Family: Theridiidae
- Genus: Rugathodes
- Species: R. bellicosus

Binomial name
- Rugathodes bellicosus (Simon, 1873)
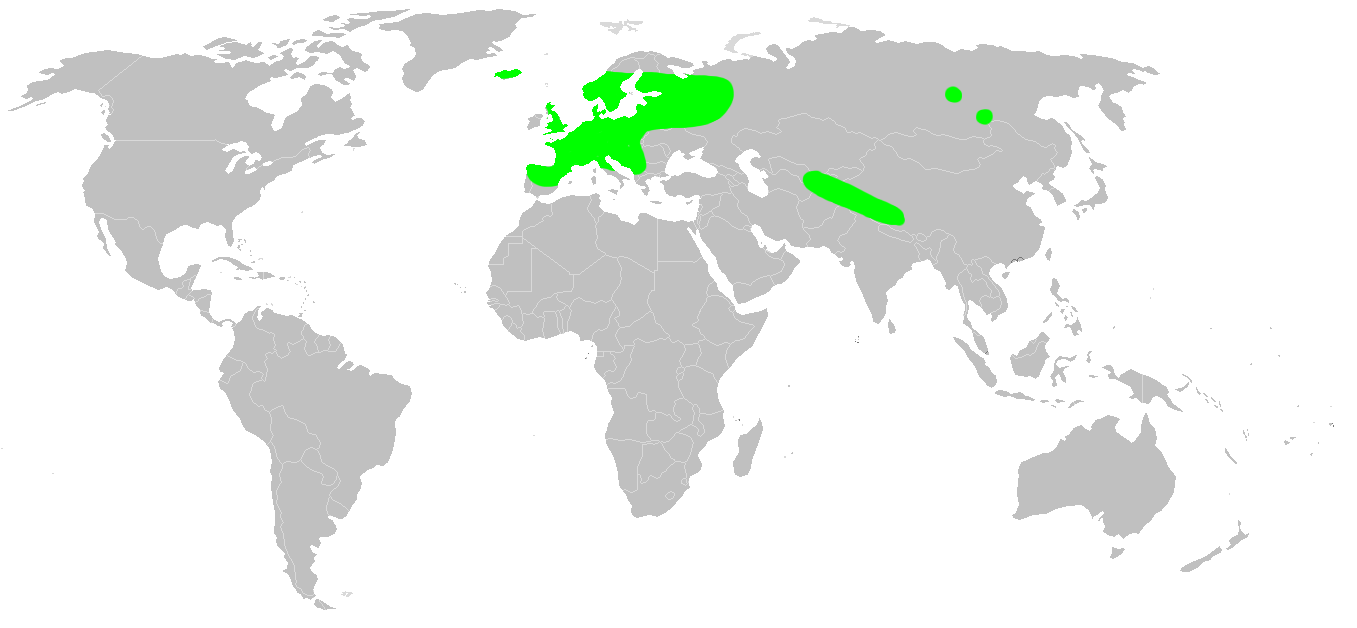

Synonyms
- Theridion bellicosum Theridion instabile bellicosum Enoplognatha bellicosa Enoplognatha bellicosum Rugathodes bellicosum

Species of spider

Rugathodes bellicosus is a small theridiid spider that occurs in Europe, including Russia. It is usually found on high ground, but also occurs on coasts. They live under large stones.

In Czechoslovakia, spiders at low altitude are only found in small caves. These specimens are not very pigmented. Other specimens that live in higher elevations live more in the open and are generally darker in color. The variation seems to be genetic rather than environmentally induced.

== Name ==
The species name is derived from Latin bellicosus "bellicose".
