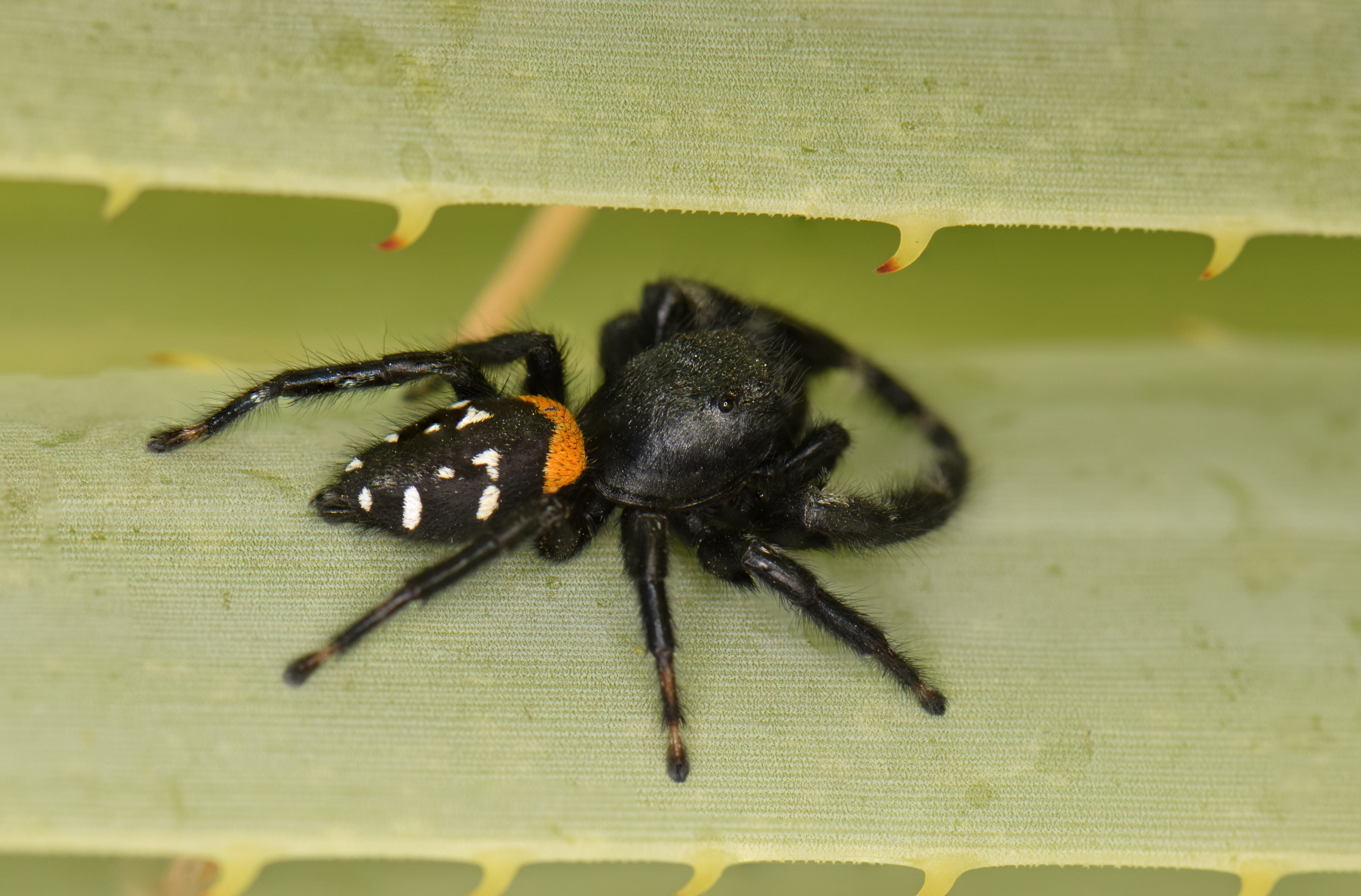

Scientific classification
- Kingdom: Animalia
- Phylum: Arthropoda
- Subphylum: Chelicerata
- Class: Arachnida
- Order: Araneae
- Infraorder: Araneomorphae
- Family: Salticidae
- Genus: Paraphidippus
- Species: P. basalis

Binomial name
- Paraphidippus basalis (Banks, 1904)

= Paraphidippus basalis =

Agave Jumping Spider

Species of spider

Paraphidippus basalis is a species of jumping spider in the family Salticidae. It is found in Arizona and New Mexico, United States, and Sonora, Mexico. Paraphidippus basalis specializes on rosette-forming plants such as agaves, sotols, and yuccas. This specialization on a single group of plants is rare among jumping spiders.
