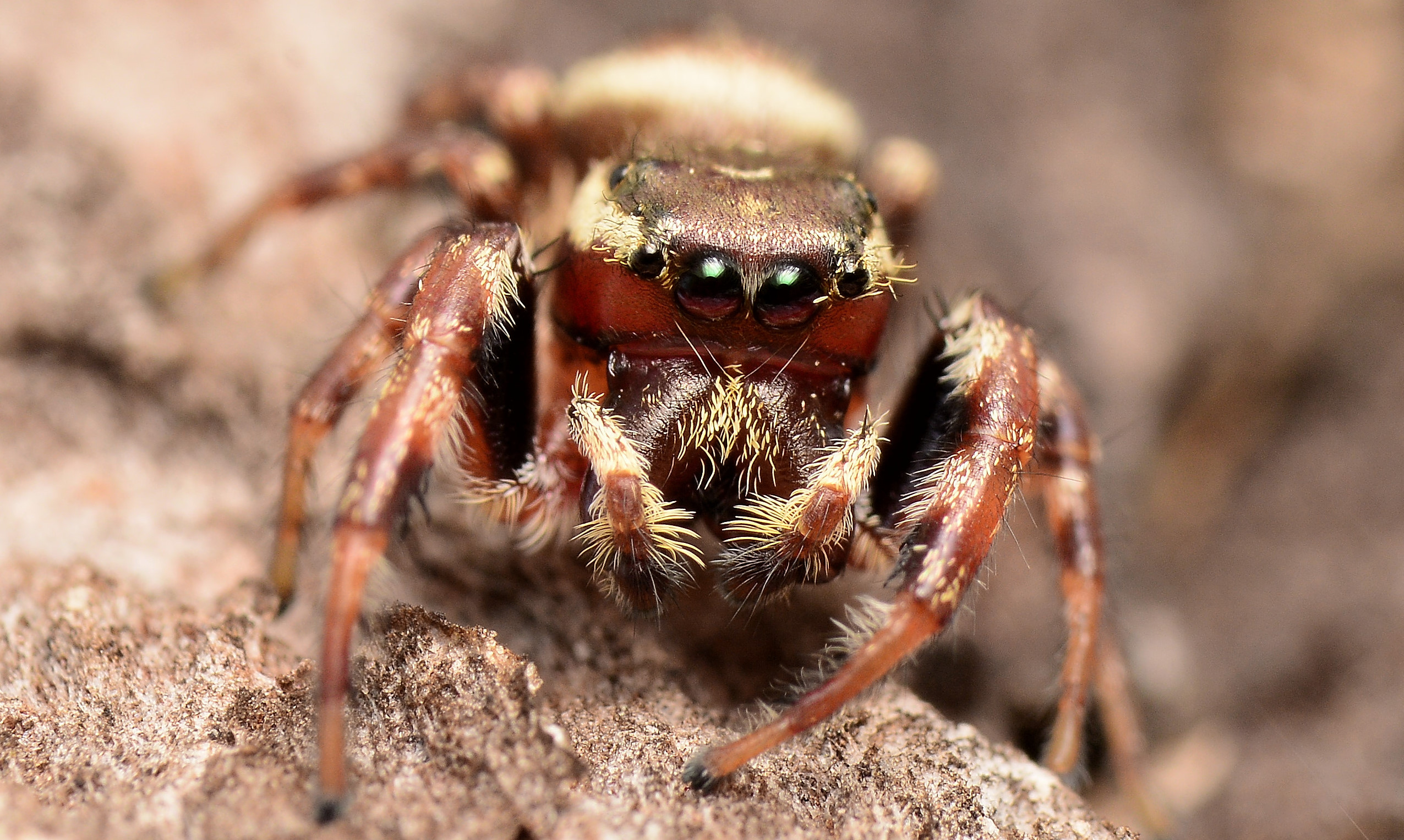
- Male

Scientific classification
- Kingdom: Animalia
- Phylum: Arthropoda
- Subphylum: Chelicerata
- Class: Arachnida
- Order: Araneae
- Infraorder: Araneomorphae
- Family: Salticidae
- Genus: Eris
- Species: E. floridana

Binomial name
- Eris floridana (Banks, 1904)

= Eris floridana =

Species of spider

Eris floridana is a species of jumping spider. It is found in the United States.

Male

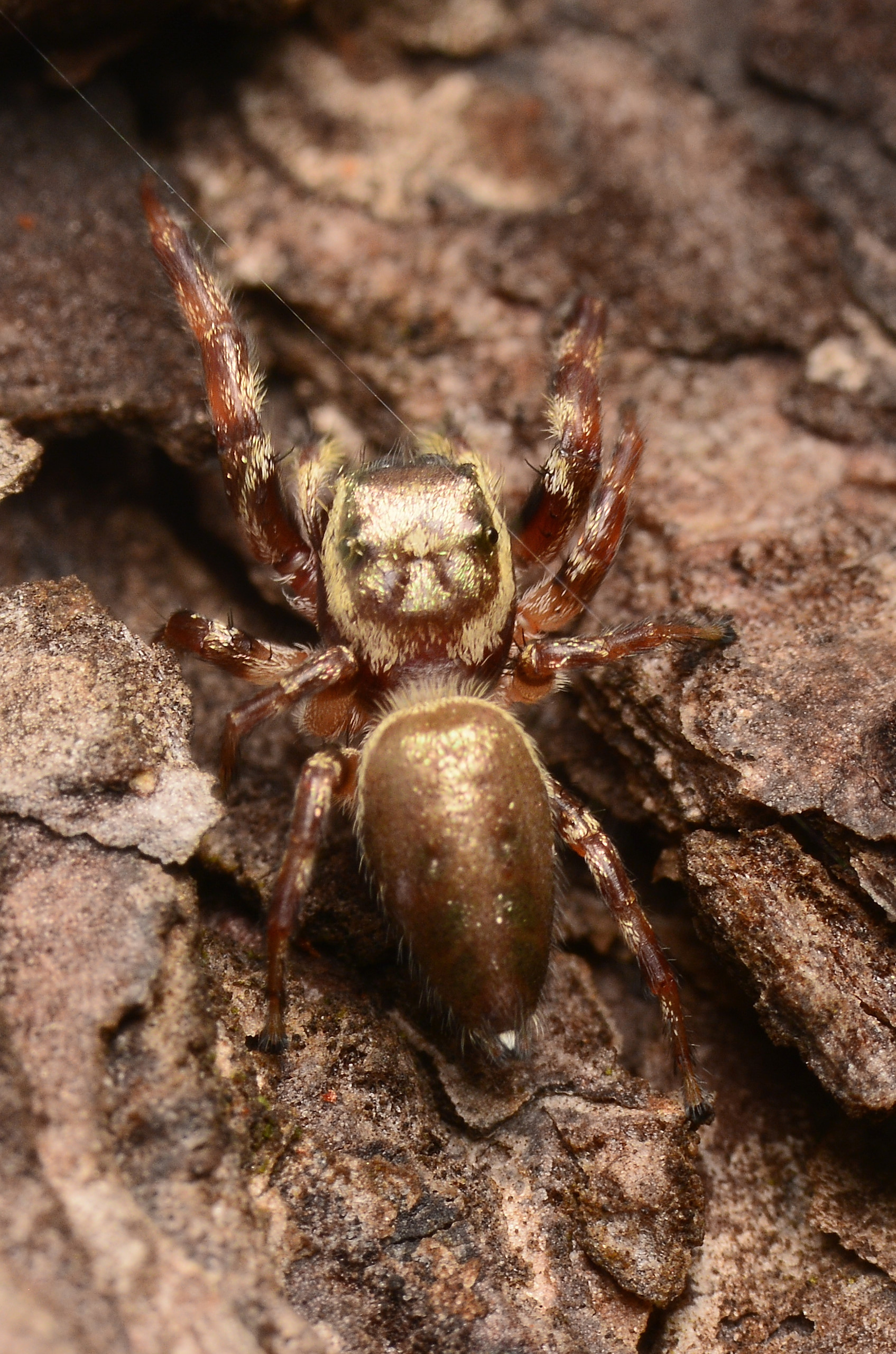
Male dorsal

Female

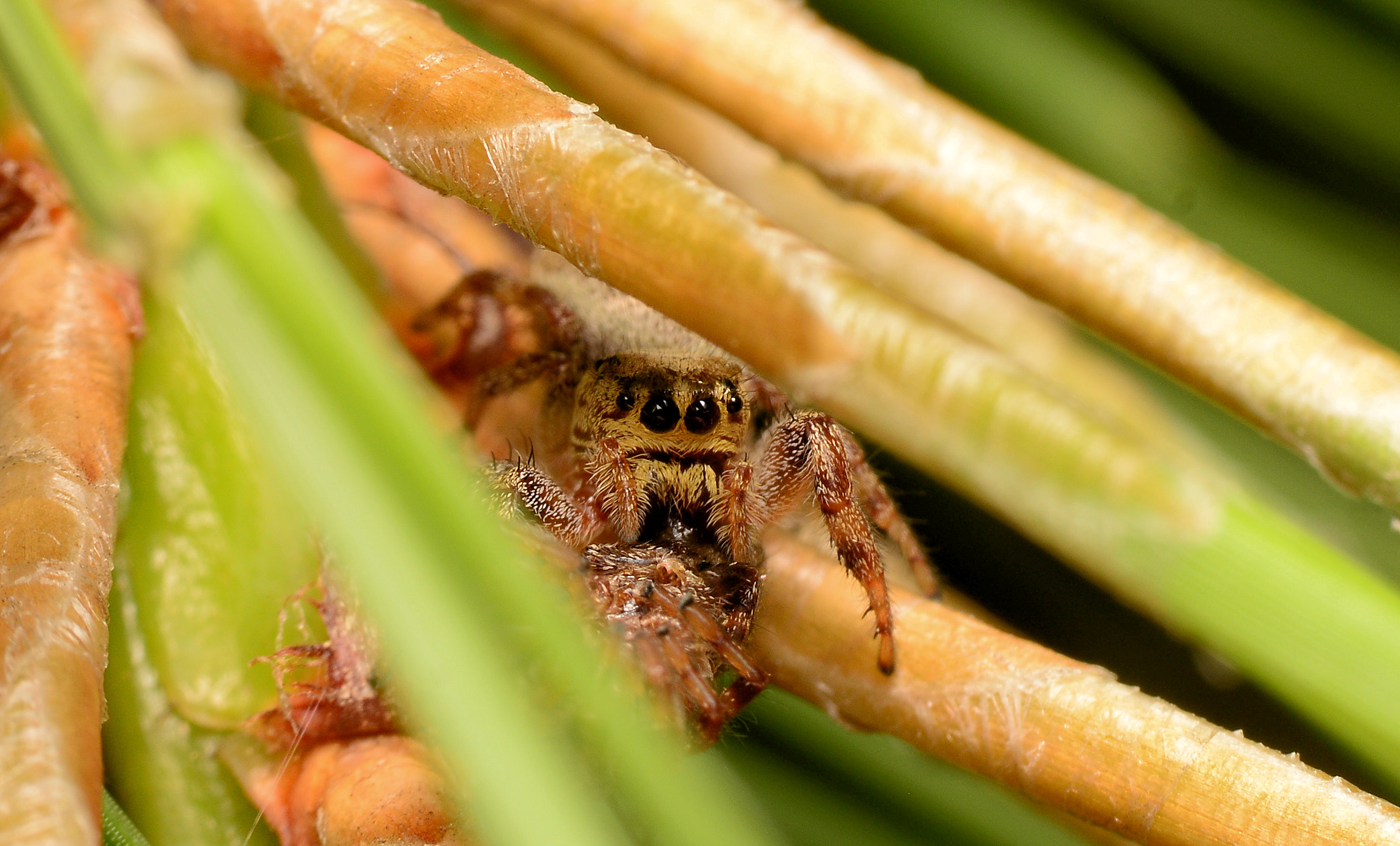
Female face

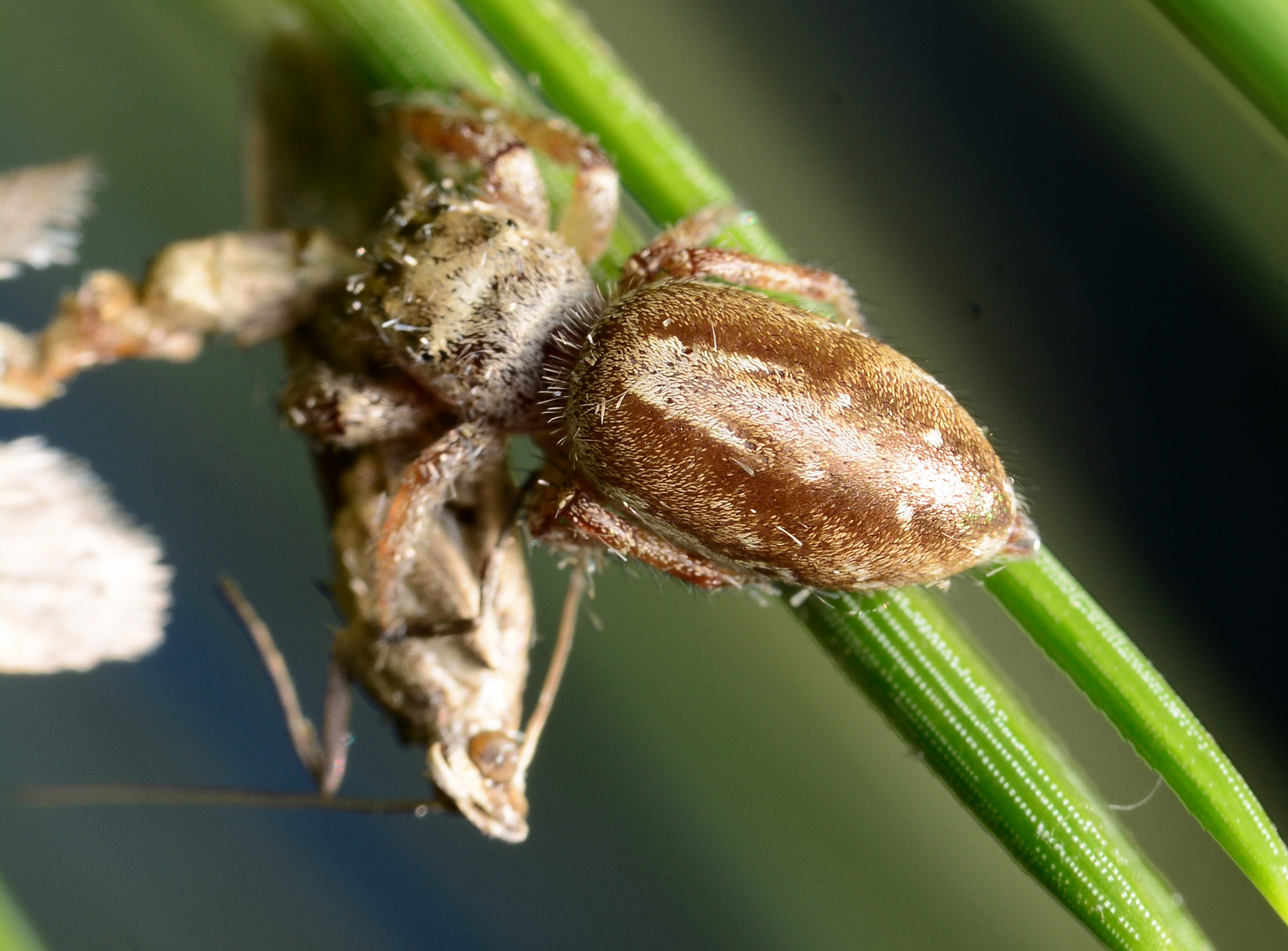
Female dorsal
