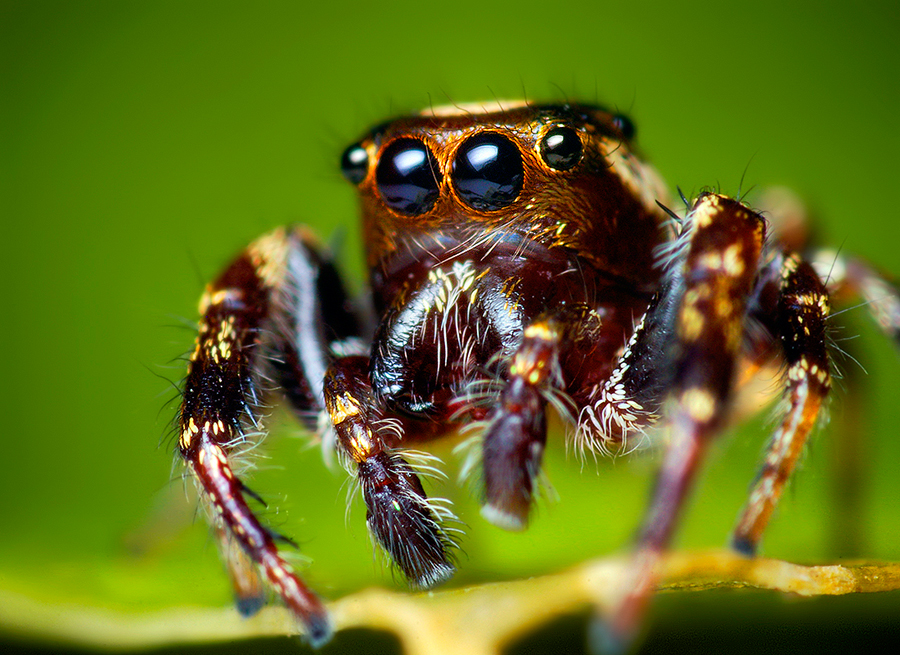
- Adult male Eris militaris (Bronze Lake Jumper)

Scientific classification
- Kingdom: Animalia
- Phylum: Arthropoda
- Subphylum: Chelicerata
- Class: Arachnida
- Order: Araneae
- Infraorder: Araneomorphae
- Family: Salticidae
- Subfamily: Salticinae
- Genus: Eris; C. L. Koch, 1846

Type species
- Attus militaris Hentz, 1845

Species
- See text.

= Eris (spider) =

Genus of spiders

Eris is a genus of the spider family Salticidae (jumping spiders). It is native to North and South America. As is typical for salticids, they are not defensive. While larger specimens could potentially bite, an envenomation would pose no danger to a human.

== Name ==
The genus name is derived from Eris, the Greek goddess of discord (known as Discordia in Roman mythology).

== Species ==
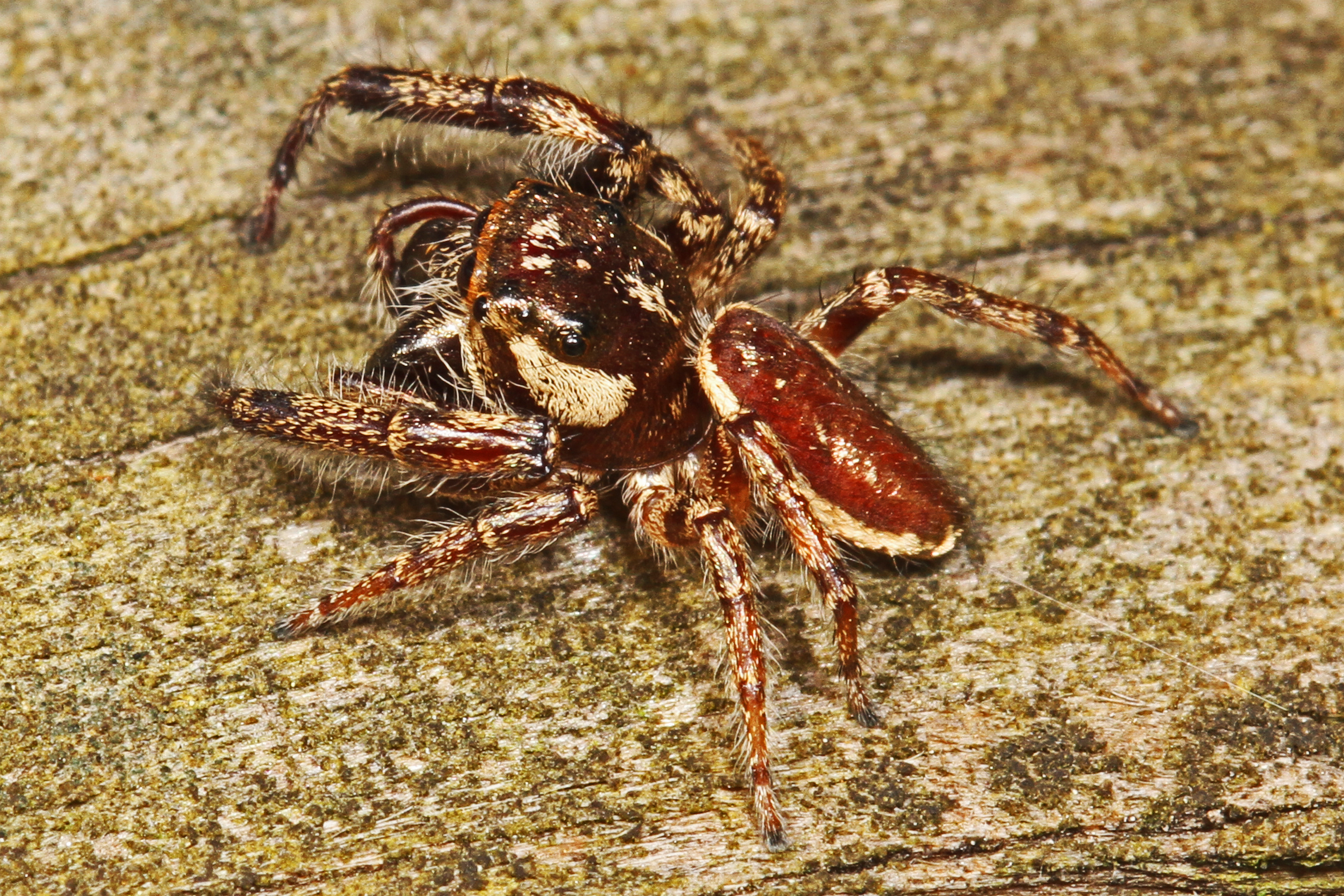
E. militaris

- Eris bulbosa (Karsch, 1880) – Mexico
- Eris flava (Peckham & Peckham, 1888) – United States to Hispaniola
- Eris floridana (Banks, 1904) – USA
- Eris illustris C. L. Koch, 1846 – Puerto Rico
- Eris limbata – United States
- Eris militaris (Hentz, 1845) – USA, Canada, Alaska
- Eris perpasta (Chickering, 1946) – Panama
- Eris perpolita (Chickering, 1946) – Panama
- Eris riedeli (Schmidt, 1971) – Ecuador or Colombia
- Eris rufa (C. L. Koch, 1846) – USA
- Eris tricolor (C. L. Koch, 1846) – Mexico
- Eris trimaculata (Banks, 1898) – Mexico
- Eris valida (Chickering, 1946) – Panama
