= Wamba crispulus =

Scientific classification
- Kingdom: Animalia
- Phylum: Arthropoda
- Subphylum: Chelicerata
- Class: Arachnida
- Order: Araneae
- Infraorder: Araneomorphae
- Family: Theridiidae
- Genus: Wamba
- Species: W. crispulus

Binomial name
- Wamba crispulus (Simon, 1895)

Species of spider

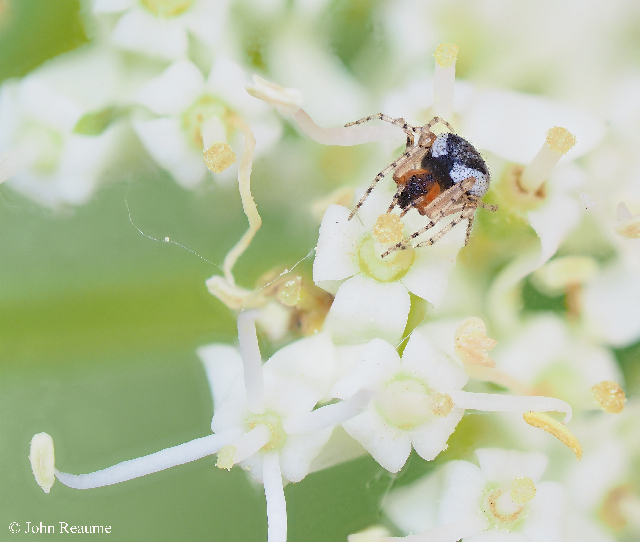

Wamba crispulus is a species of cobweb spider in the family Theridiidae. It is found in a range from Canada to Brazil and the Caribbean.
