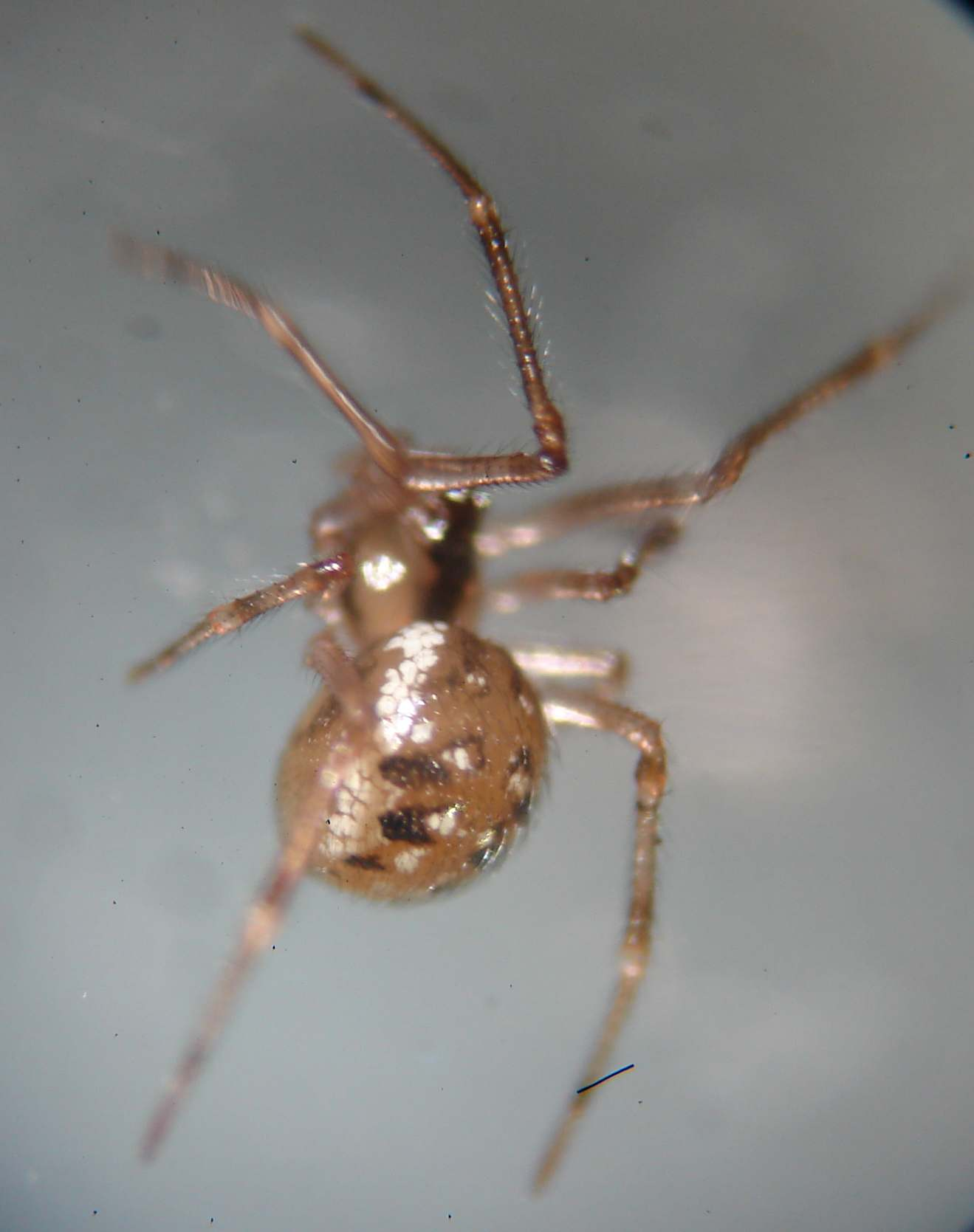
- Rugathodes sexpunctatus female, typical color

Scientific classification
- Domain: Eukaryota
- Kingdom: Animalia
- Phylum: Arthropoda
- Subphylum: Chelicerata
- Class: Arachnida
- Order: Araneae
- Infraorder: Araneomorphae
- Family: Theridiidae
- Genus: Rugathodes
- Species: R. sexpunctatus

Binomial name
- Rugathodes sexpunctatus Emerton, 1882

Synonyms
- Theridion sexpunctatum

= Rugathodes sexpunctatus =

Species of spider

Rugathodes sexpunctatus is a minute species of spider in the family Theridiidae, the cobweb or tangle-web spiders. This family includes the medically important genus Latrodectus—the widow spiders. The species in the genus Rugathodes are too small to be dangerous to humans. Very little is known about most species in this genus.

== Description ==
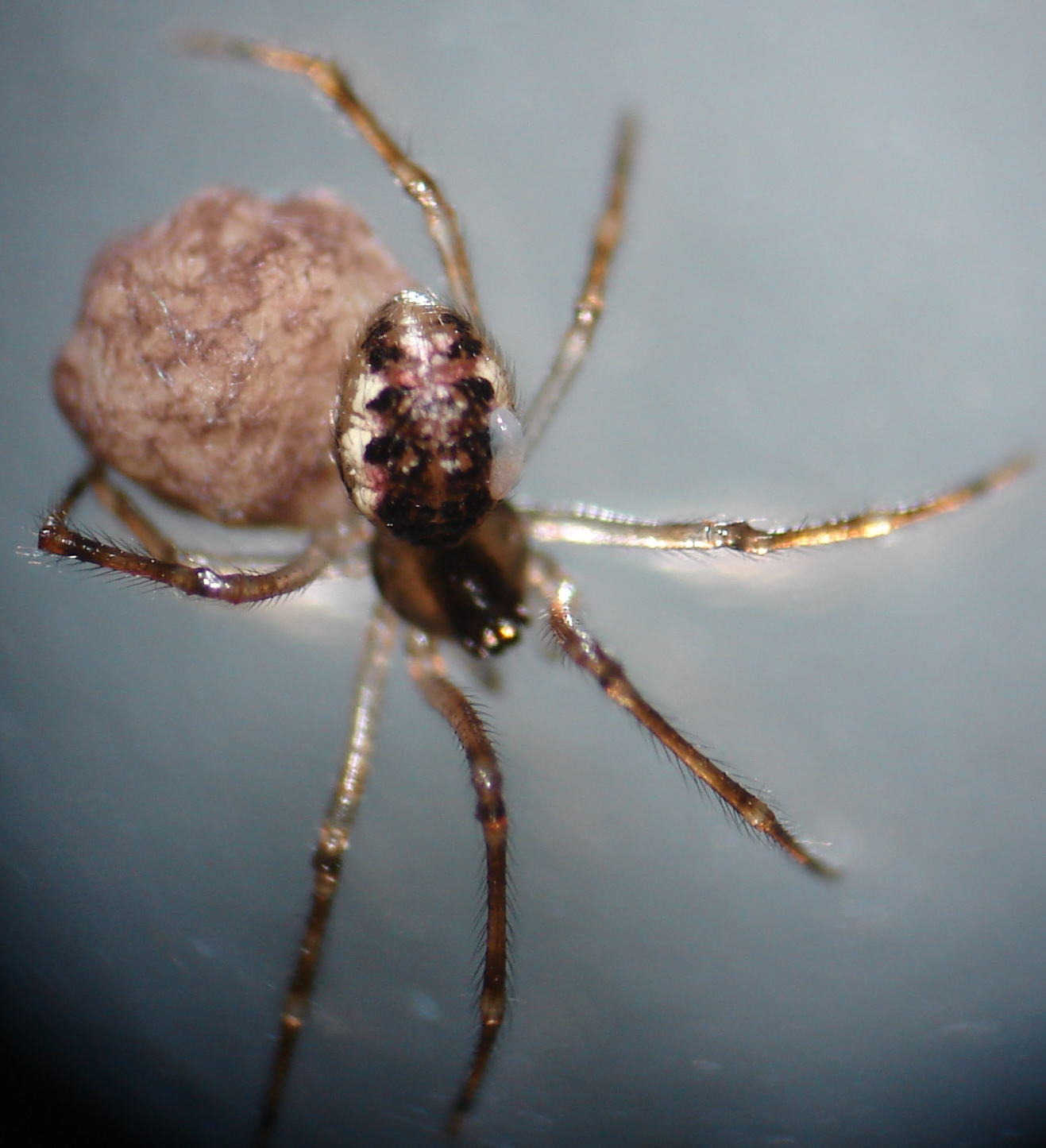
Pink phase female carrying eggcase, parasitic wasp larva on abdomen

Total length (of body, excluding legs) is 1.5-2.5 mm. Typically, the cephalothorax is pale yellow-brown with a dark/blackish median band, usually extending the full length of the carapace, widest at the posterior eye row, surrounding the eyes. The cephalothorax margins are dusky. The abdomen is pale yellow-brown with a variable pattern of three pairs of black and white spots, giving the species its name (from the Latin sex meaning "six" and punctum meaning "spot"). There is often a broken white band bordering the rows of spots. The sides of the abdomen are dusky and the ventral surface is pale. There is considerable variation within the species, with east coast specimens tending to have distinct spots, while west coast specimens can have a totally black abdominal dorsum. Alaska specimens tend to be intermediate in coloration, but are variable, with overall coloration from the typical pale yellow-brown to dark brown or greenish-gray, and occasionally pinkish areas on the dorsum between the spots. Darker individuals can be very difficult to differentiate from the closely related Rugathodes aurantius.

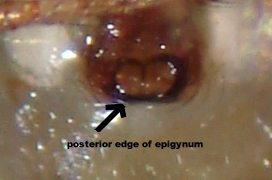
female epigynum

Female distinguishing characteristics: The paired openings of the epigynum (epigyne) are nearly merged into a single oval opening, with a variable median divider extending in from the anterior side, giving the impression of a rounded ‘B’ lying on its back.

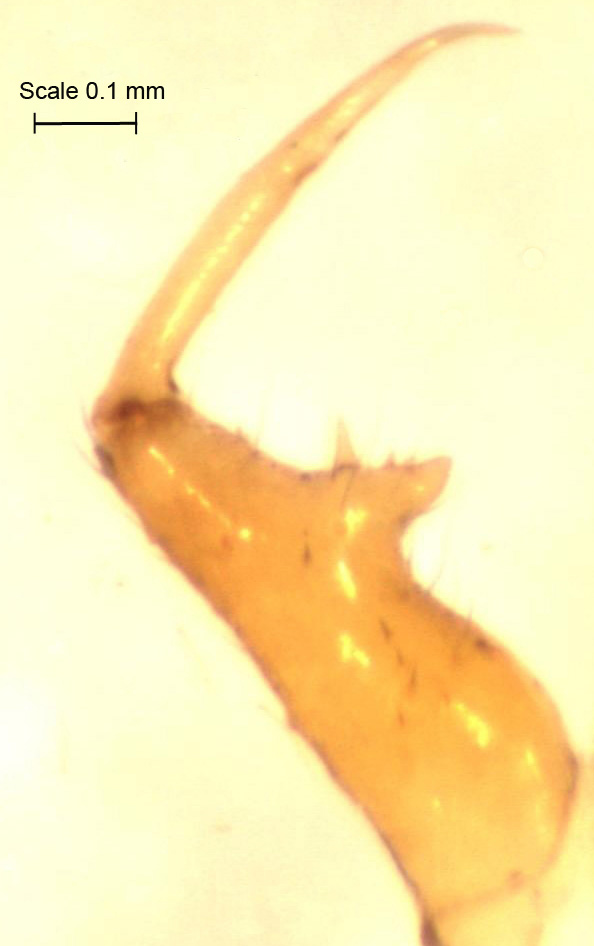
male chelicera

Male distinguishing characteristics: The chelicerae (fangs) are enlarged with a very distinctive shape, as shown in the photograph.

== Distribution ==
This species is widespread across the United States, southern Canada and Russia. In North America, it has been reported from the far Aleutians (Kanaga Island) to Newfoundland, south to central California, northern Arizona and North Carolina. It is usually found in coniferous forests, both in the trees and in the understory vegetation. They have been observed overwintering in leaf litter. It is considered a boreal species that is found at higher elevations in the southern parts of its range.

== Life history ==
Rugathodes sexpunctatus has roughly an annual life cycle. Both males and females usually overwinter in the pentultimate (1 molt prior to adult) stage. They mature and breed in late spring, with the males probably dying soon after mating since they are rarely collected past early summer. Adult females have been collected through early fall. Egg sacs have been observed through September, with later egg sacs containing fewer eggs/spiderlings. It is not known whether the later egg sacs are repeat layings by the same female. Females have been observed moving their egg sac around their web, carrying it under their abdomens, especially when disturbed. Spiderlings molt once in the egg sac prior to emerging as second instars. The fifth instar is the adult stage.
