= Wamba congener =

Scientific classification
- Domain: Eukaryota
- Kingdom: Animalia
- Phylum: Arthropoda
- Subphylum: Chelicerata
- Class: Arachnida
- Order: Araneae
- Infraorder: Araneomorphae
- Family: Theridiidae
- Genus: Wamba
- Species: W. congener

Binomial name
- Wamba congener O. Pickard-Cambridge, 1896

Species of spider

Wamba congener is a species of comb-footed spider in the family Theridiidae. It is found in USA, the Caribbean, and Central/South America.
