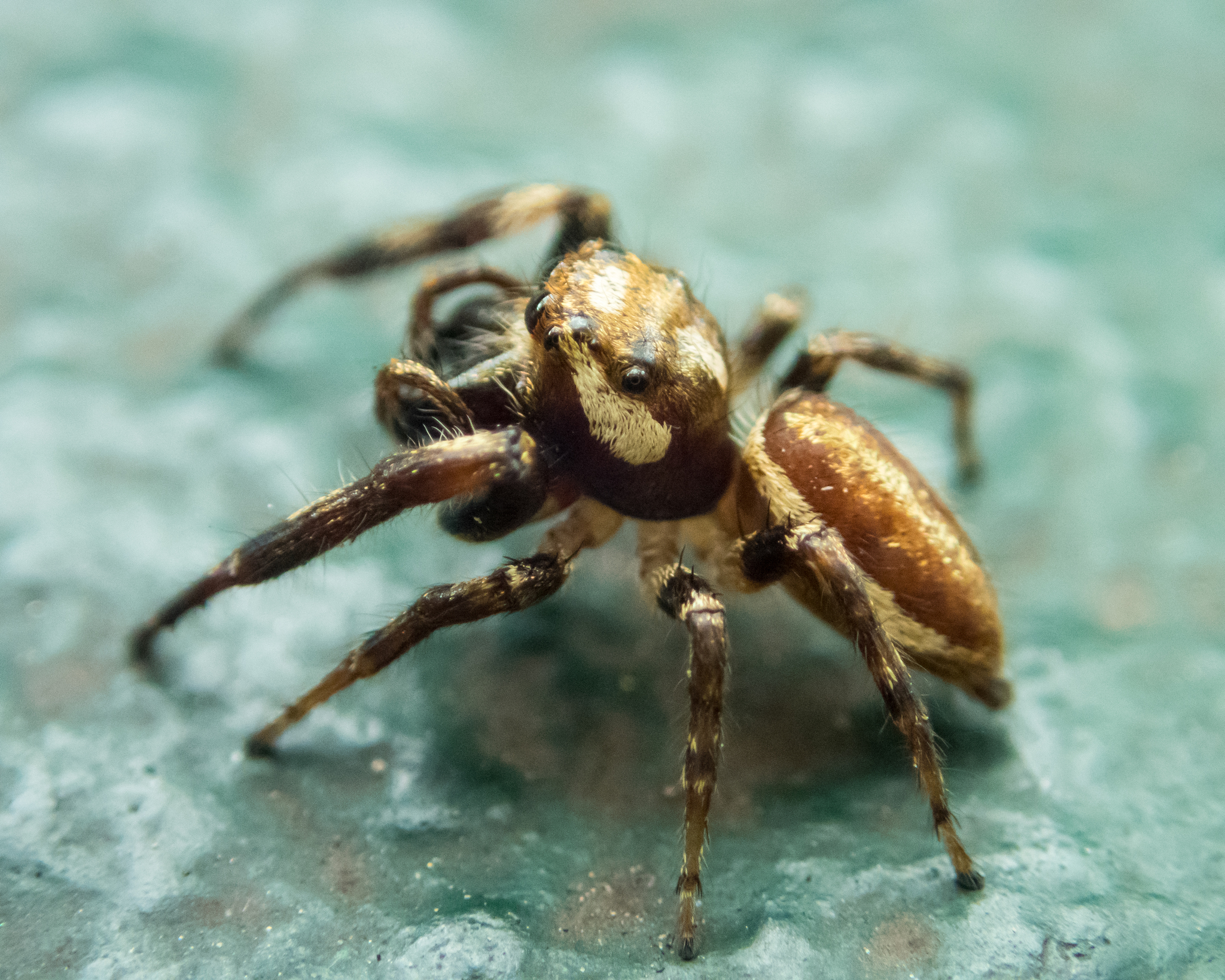
- Male
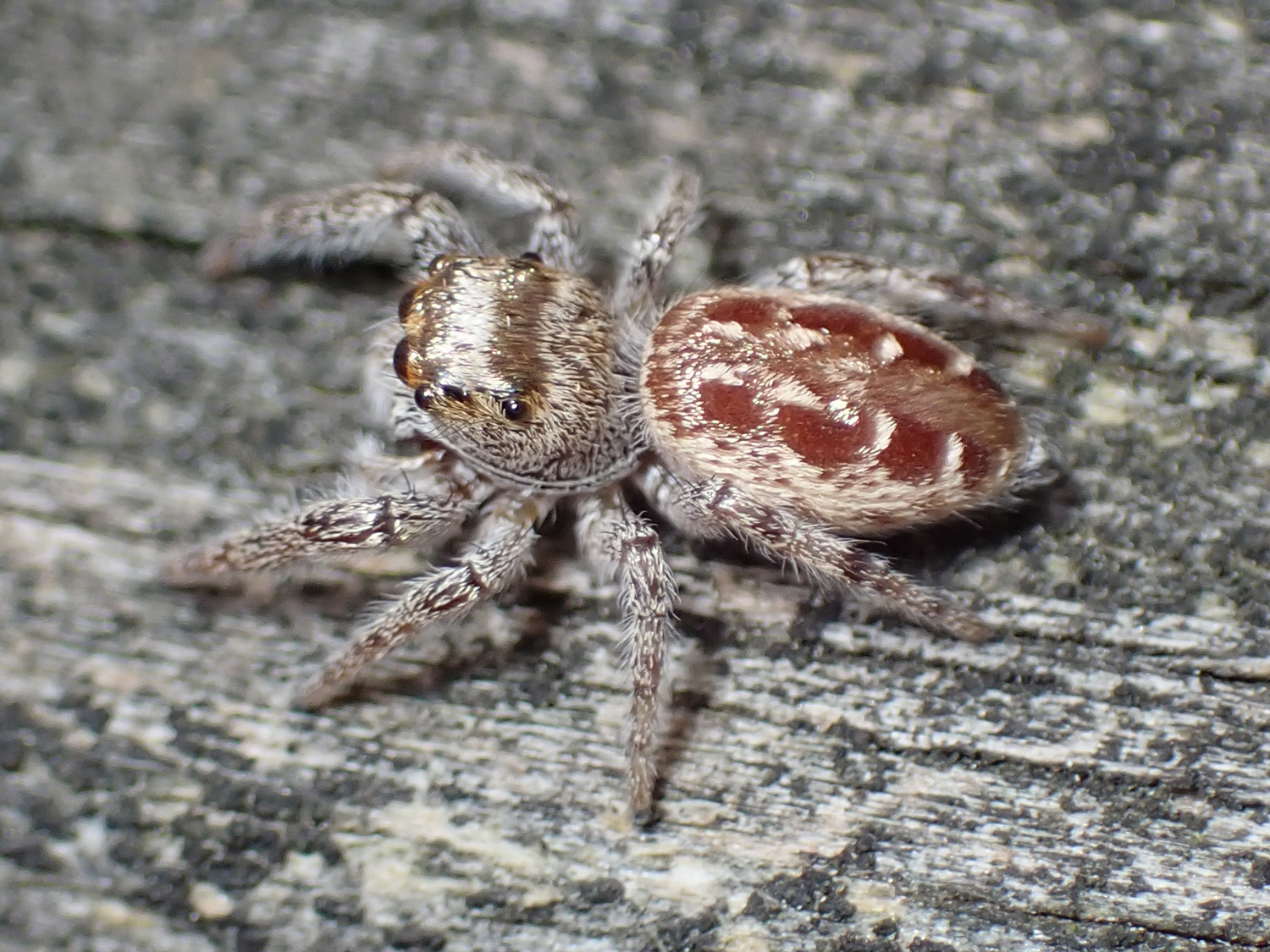
- Female

Scientific classification
- Kingdom: Animalia
- Phylum: Arthropoda
- Subphylum: Chelicerata
- Class: Arachnida
- Order: Araneae
- Infraorder: Araneomorphae
- Family: Salticidae
- Genus: Eris
- Species: E. militaris

Binomial name
- Eris militaris (Hentz, 1845)

= Eris militaris =

Species of spider

Eris militaris, known commonly as the bronze jumper or bronze lake jumper, is a species of jumping spider, belonging to the Salticidae family. It is found in the United States and Canada within both suburban and rural areas. The male and female of this species can be differentiated from their size or by the coloration on their cephalothorax and abdomen. The females have a lighter cephalothorax a slightly darker abdomen with white spots. They are active in the autumn and winter season and can be found in sheltered areas within vegetation. They can also be found living within apple orchards, where insecticides may be present, which can potentially effect or alter their personality and behavior. Their diet consists of small insects, almost anything they can hold.

== Description ==
Drawings by CL Koch (1846)

female

male

female

The cephalothorax is one physical characteristic that shows differences between the male and females appearances. The female's cephalothorax are lighter in color compared to the male's, with a darker cephalothorax. The females abdomen are a bit darker with multiple white spots located dorsally. Males have a lighter abdomen and a darker cephalothorax, each with white bands along the sides. These white bands are absent on the females cephalothorax but present on their abdomen. On the males, the fang-bearing appendages, known as chelicerae, are long and located at the front of their cephalothorax.

The length of males ranges from 4.7 to 6.7 millimeters, while the females can span from 6 to 8 millimeters in length.

== Behavior ==
From the autumn to winter season, they can be found together in groups and beneath surfaces, such as dead wood. In locations like this, they are easily camouflaged due to their bronze, tan, brown coloration.

After consuming prey, they groom themselves. Often grooming their chelicerae and rubbing them on their pedipalps. Grooming also appears during periods of rest, such as in a hidden spot within vegetation or within its shelter.

Male Eris militaris participate in a dance in an attempt to win over a potential mate. This dance consists of the male lifting its forelegs outward and occasionally stepping side to side while its forelegs move consistently.

== Distribution ==
Eris militaris can be found within the United States and Canada. They are commonly found in autumn walking inside or outside of buildings. They can be found in hidden areas, such as blackberry bushes, where the leaves overlap and create small shelters.

== Diet ==
Jumping spider diets consist of small insects such as grasshoppers, moths, flies, or other spiders. They can eat almost anything that their chelicerae can hold. Other prey includes fruit flies, bees, wasps, crickets, worms, butterflies, or leafhoppers.

== Insecticide effects ==
Similar to how humans personalities can shift due to chemicals, spiders personalities can too. A hazardous but not quite lethal amount of a leftover insecticide, such as in apple orchards, can change individual spiders' personalities and alter behavior once exposed. Insecticide effects on behavior include spatial memory decreasing and their learning abilities decreasing. A reason for insecticides affecting bronze jumper behavior may be due to less food in locations with insecticide exposure. Despite its negative effects on some species, insecticides are still commonly used in agriculture.

Drugs and insecticides show similarities, with both attacking the nervous system and having the ability to change behavior or lead to death when ingested in lethal amounts. The same way drugs do, common insecticides can affect web building. Males and females of this species respond differently when exposed to insecticides. Males can be seen to be more affected when searching around their environment but still able to capture their prey. Females strength in the ability to capture prey decreases.

Bronze jumpers, and other spiders, play important roles for regulation of pests in these agricultural locations. With insecticides in these areas, their ability to catch prey is affected, thereby affecting pest regulation in ecosystems.
