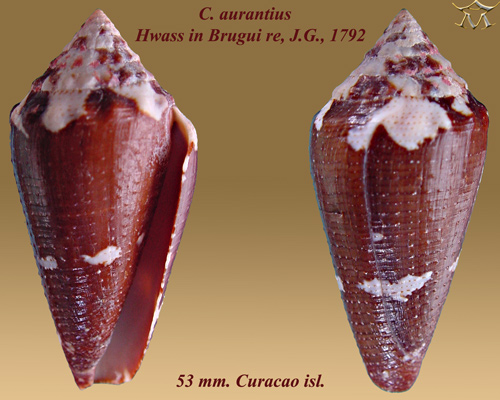
- Apertural and abapertural views of shell of Conus aurantius Hwass in Bruguière, J.G., 1792
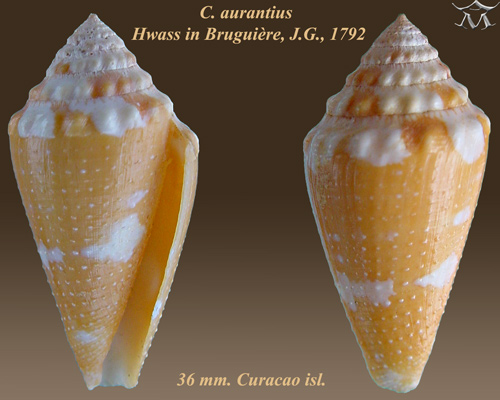

Conservation status
- Near Threatened (IUCN 3.1)

Scientific classification
- Kingdom: Animalia
- Phylum: Mollusca
- Class: Gastropoda
- Subclass: Caenogastropoda
- Order: Neogastropoda
- Superfamily: Conoidea
- Family: Conidae
- Genus: Conus
- Species: C. aurantius

Binomial name
- Conus aurantius Hwass in Bruguière, 1792

Synonyms
- Conus (Stephanoconus) aurantius Hwass in Bruguière, 1792 accepted, alternate representation; Protoconus aurantius (Hwass in Bruguière, 1792); Tenorioconus aurantius (Hwass in Bruguière, 1792)

= Conus aurantius =

Species of sea snail

Conus aurantius, common name the golden cone, is a species of sea snail, a marine gastropod mollusk in the family Conidae, the cone snails and their allies.

Like all species within the genus Conus, these snails are predatory and venomous. They are capable of stinging humans, therefore live ones should be handled carefully or not at all.

== Distribution ==
This marine snail occurs off the Netherlands Antilles and off the Virgin Islands.

== Description ==
The maximum recorded shell length is 70.4 mm. The shell has an elevated, tuberculated spire. The surface is irregularly clouded with chestnut or orange and white, and minutely marked with interrupted narrow brown or orange revolving lines, more or less broken up into articulations. Upon the lower half of the body whorl these lines become striae, and are distantly, minutely granular.

== Habitat ==
Minimum recorded depth is 1.5 m. Maximum recorded depth is 10 m.
