= Sceloporus aurantius =

Scientific classification
- Domain: Eukaryota
- Kingdom: Animalia
- Phylum: Chordata
- Class: Reptilia
- Order: Squamata
- Suborder: Iguania
- Family: Phrynosomatidae
- Genus: Sceloporus
- Species: S. aurantius

Binomial name
- Sceloporus aurantius Grummer & Bryson, 2014

Species of lizard

Sceloporus aurantius, the southern occidental bunchgrass lizard, is a species of phrynosomatid lizard native to Mexico. It was discovered by University of Washington biologists in May 2014 upon isolating gene pools from those of Sceloporus brownorum.

== Description ==
This bunchgrass lizard was mistakenly categorized as a subspecies of Sceloporus brownorum, but features different morphological characteristics, most notably, the lack of blue belly patches in males. The uniqueness of this species lies in its orange sides on their bellies, which plays a major role in selective reproduction. Sceloporus aurantius is similar to Sceloporus chaneyi which does not have these blue patches, but differs from this species in size, number of dorsal scales and number of scales around the midsection.

== Distribution ==
It is most commonly found near isolated areas along the southern sky islands of the Sierra Madre Occidental in Mexico.
