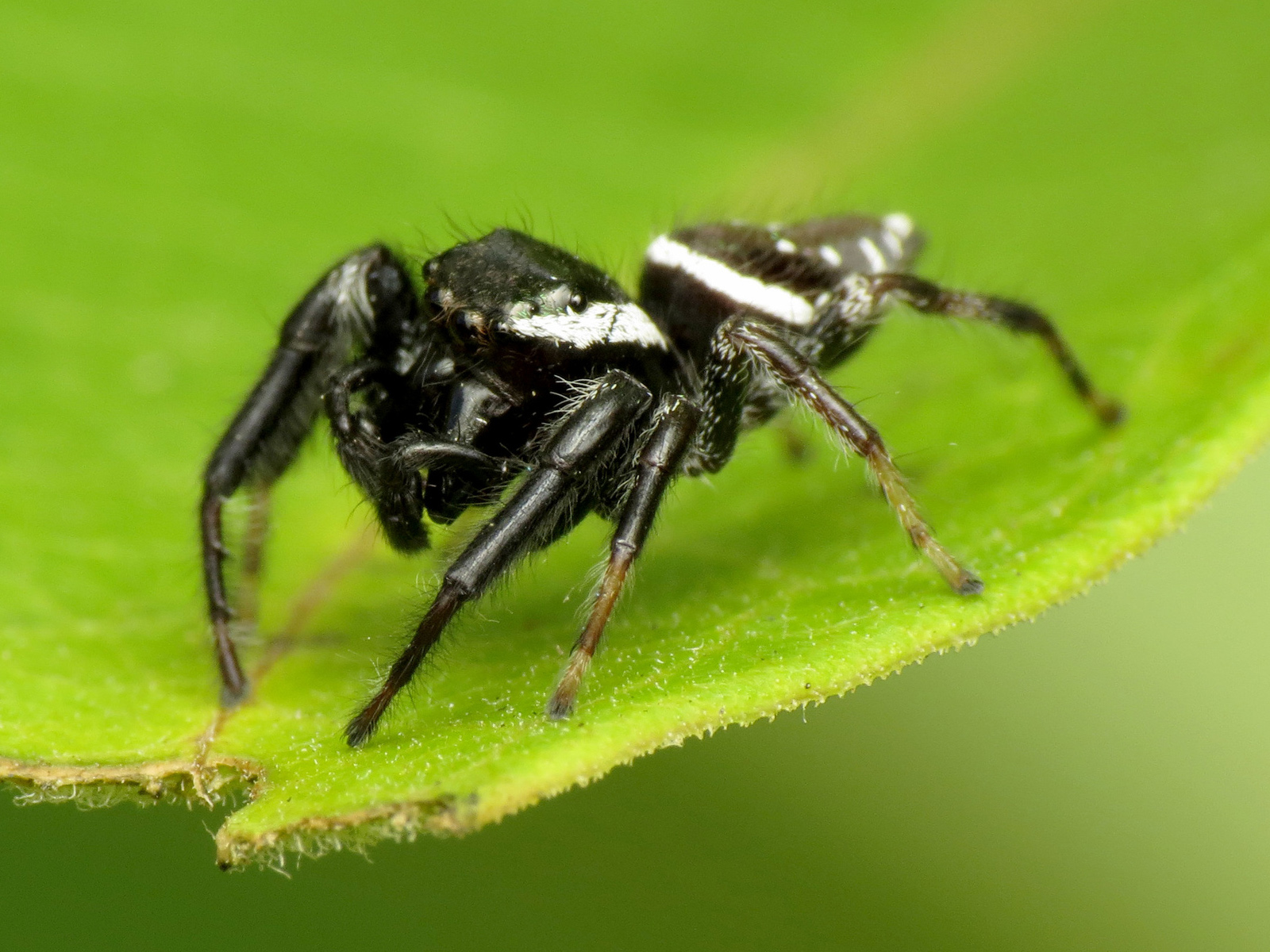
- Paraphidippus aurantius

Scientific classification
- Kingdom: Animalia
- Phylum: Arthropoda
- Subphylum: Chelicerata
- Class: Arachnida
- Order: Araneae
- Infraorder: Araneomorphae
- Family: Salticidae
- Subfamily: Salticinae
- Genus: Paraphidippus; F. O. Pickard-Cambridge, 1901

Type species
- P. laniipes F. O. Pickard-Cambridge, 1901

Species
- 14, see text

= Paraphidippus =

Genus of spiders

Paraphidippus is a genus of jumping spiders that was first described by Frederick Octavius Pickard-Cambridge in 1901. The name is a combination of the Ancient Greek "para" (παρά), meaning "alongside", and the salticid genus Phidippus.

== Species ==
As of August 2019 it contains fourteen species, found in Central America, Mexico, the United States, and on the Greater Antilles:

- Paraphidippus aurantius (Lucas, 1833) – USA to Panama, Greater Antilles
- Paraphidippus basalis (Banks, 1904) – USA
- Paraphidippus disjunctus (Banks, 1898) – Mexico to Costa Rica
- Paraphidippus fartilis (Peckham & Peckham, 1888) – USA to Costa Rica
- Paraphidippus fulgidus (C. L. Koch, 1846) – Mexico
- Paraphidippus funebris (Banks, 1898) – Mexico to Costa Rica
- Paraphidippus fuscipes (C. L. Koch, 1846) – Mexico
- Paraphidippus incontestus (Banks, 1909) – Costa Rica
- Paraphidippus inermis F. O. Pickard-Cambridge, 1901 – Mexico to Costa Rica
- Paraphidippus laniipes F. O. Pickard-Cambridge, 1901 (type) – Mexico
- Paraphidippus luteus (Peckham & Peckham, 1896) – Honduras, Costa Rica
- Paraphidippus mexicanus (Peckham & Peckham, 1888) – Mexico
- Paraphidippus nigropilosus (Banks, 1898) – Mexico
- Paraphidippus nitens (C. L. Koch, 1846) – Mexico
