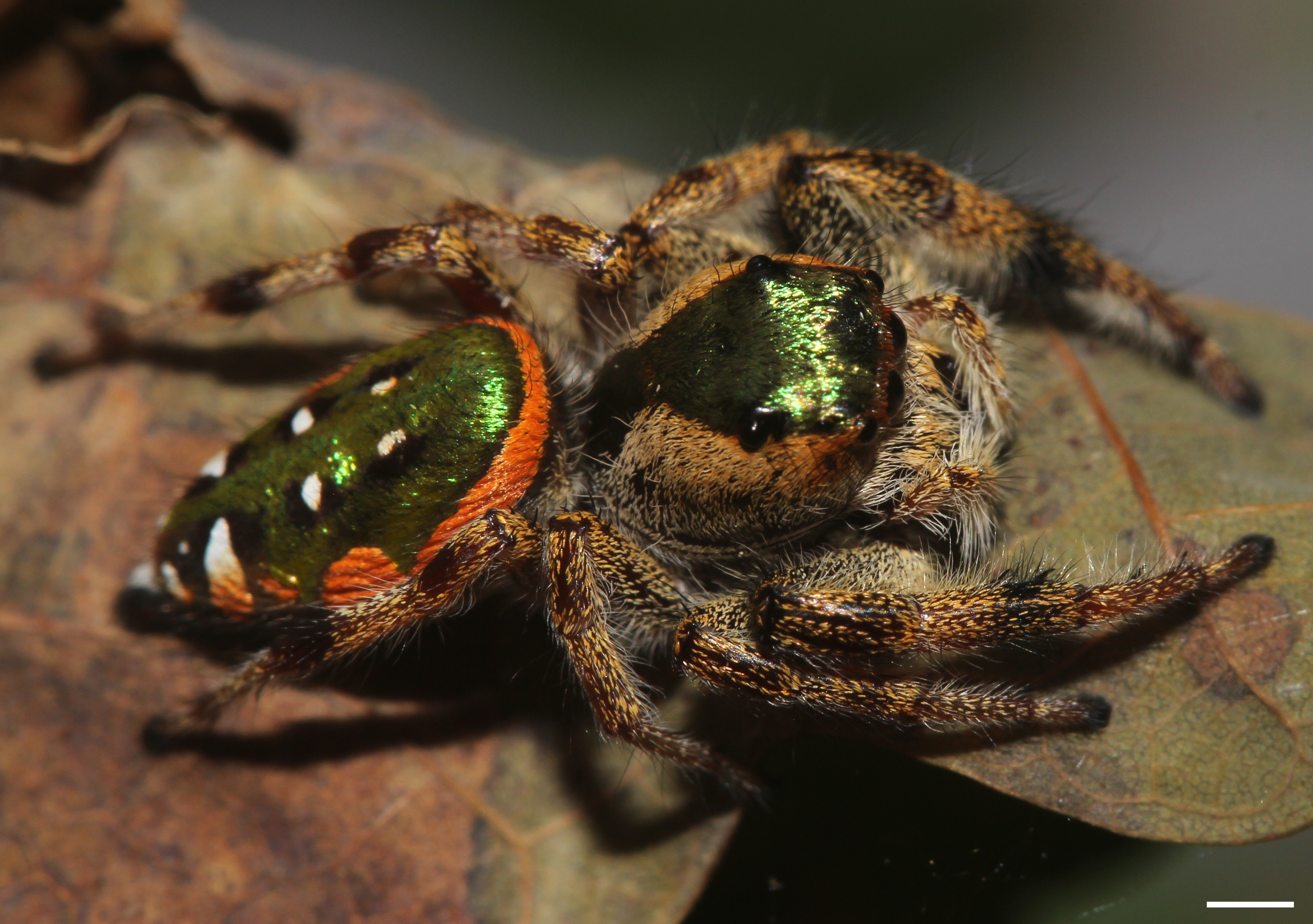
- Female
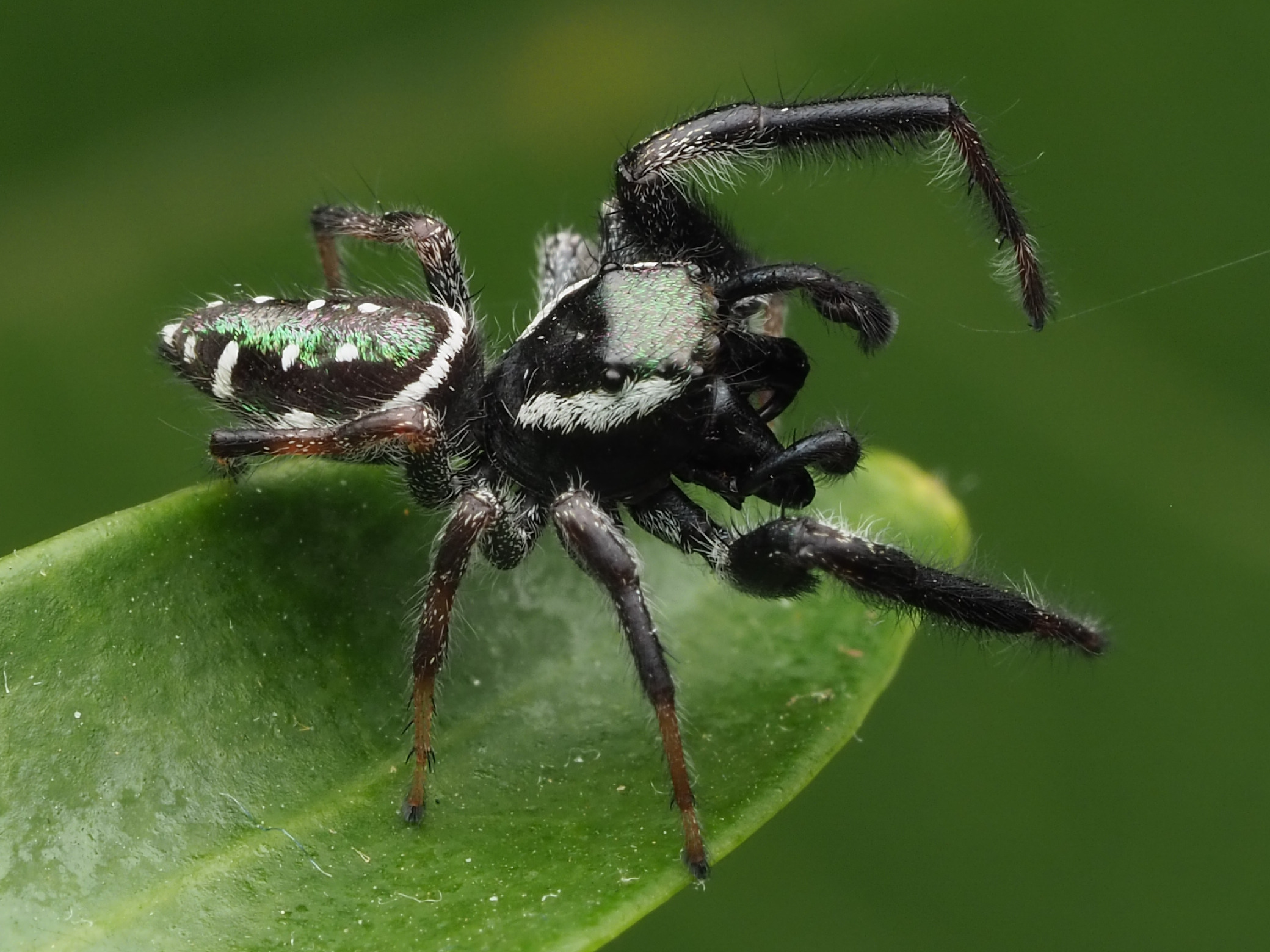
- Male

Scientific classification
- Kingdom: Animalia
- Phylum: Arthropoda
- Subphylum: Chelicerata
- Class: Arachnida
- Order: Araneae
- Infraorder: Araneomorphae
- Family: Salticidae
- Genus: Paraphidippus
- Species: P. aurantius

Binomial name
- Paraphidippus aurantius (Lucas, 1833)

Synonyms
- Salticus aurantius; Attus chrysis; Attus iris; Attus multicolor; Plexippus orichalceus; Attus aurantius; Attus brendeli; Plexippa chrysis; Phylaeus chrysis; Dendryphantes multicolor; Phidippus orichalceus; Phidippus fraternus; Philaeus multicolor; Paraphidippus chrysis; Paraphydippus multicolor; Paraphydippus aureus; Dendryphantes aurantius; Eris aurantia

= Paraphidippus aurantius =

Species of spider

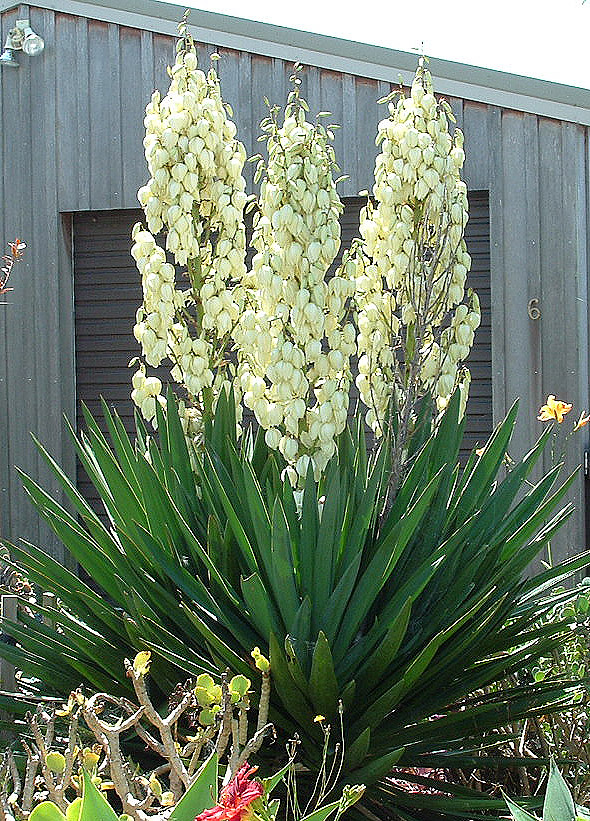
Yucca Bush - a possible habitat

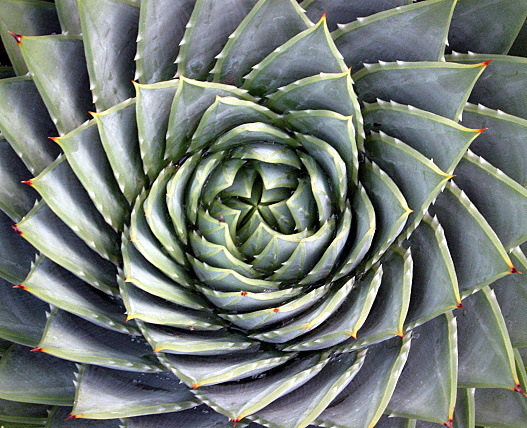
Rosette-forming plants- another possible habitat for the spiders

Paraphidippus aurantius is a species of jumping spider, commonly known as the emerald jumping spider or golden jumping spider. P. aurantius is a solitary hunter, with a fairly large size for a jumping spider. It is green or black with white side stripes on each side of its head and a white border around the top of the abdomen. It also has a midline of hairs down its center with small white dots and lines on either side.

== Classification ==
Paraphidippus aurantius is located within the clade Salticoida. Other genera like Beata and Phidippus are also found in this clade in the subfamily Salticinae. All three of these genera can be classified into their clade because of key features that they share. One of those feature that classifies the genus Phidippus is the measurement of the body. Because all three of these species fall into the same measurement of approximately 10 mm, they are located in the same genus. Aurantius, Beata, and Phidippus species all have the dendryphantine male palpus. (The palpus on a spider is the male structure for reproduction.) The palpus is in the same location and position on the {insect} on all of the male spiders, classifying them into this genus. They also all have the visible feature of having a puffy appearance. The hairs on their body stick upwards, which is why they have this distinct look.

== Location and habitat ==
Paraphidippus aurantius's genus, Phidippus, abodes all across North America. Spiders within this genus are found in Mexico, the United States, and some of South America. When choosing a place to live, Paraphidippus aurantius, as well as other spiders in the Phidippus genus, seek shelter from the rain and a good viewpoint of the world around them; a leaf with a large amount of surface area can provide both of those things. Plants that they typically tend to live on are yucca, and rosette-forming plants, however, the plants may vary depending on which specific area they live in.

== Distribution ==
Paraphidippus aurantius occurs from the United States to Panama, and on the Greater Antilles.

== Hunting and diet ==
Paraphidippus aurantius is an active predator that preys on a variety of other animals. This species hunts both vertebrates and invertebrates, including other spiders. When attacking, P. aurantius uses a cautious approach. The typical process includes first biting to inject a paralyzing venom, jumping back and maintaining a safe distance while it takes effect, then returning to the prey when it is no longer mobile. This hunting strategy enables P. aurantius to feed on animals that are much larger than itself. Some observed instances include birds that are several times the size of P. aurantius in length, and even greater in overall mass. The spider may take an extended period of time to eat large prey before abandoning the carcass at the kill site.

== Bites to humans ==
When threatened, Paraphidippus aurantius can deliver a bite to humans. Unlike the small prey that this species typically bites, it is not capable of inflicting paralysis on a person. P. aurantius poses minimal danger to humans, as bites are comparable to that of a mosquito. When venom is injected, it is typical for an area on the surface of the skin with a diameter of approximately 1 cm to promptly become inflamed. Itching has been reported as a symptom more frequently than pain. In one instance, the itchiness commenced in about a week. Generally, the affected area appears completely healed in one month's time or less.
