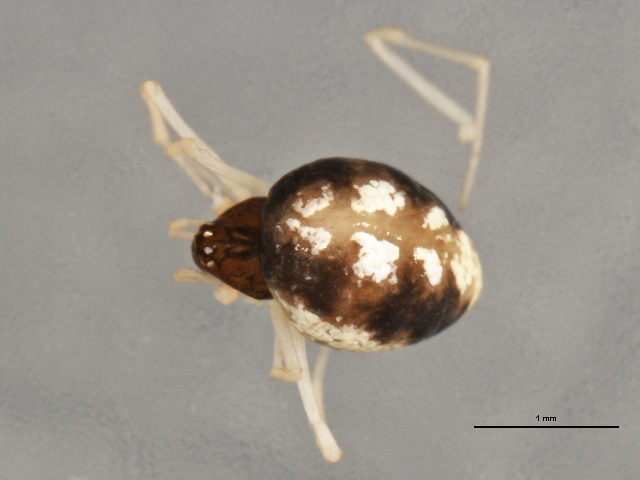
- R. aurantius, female
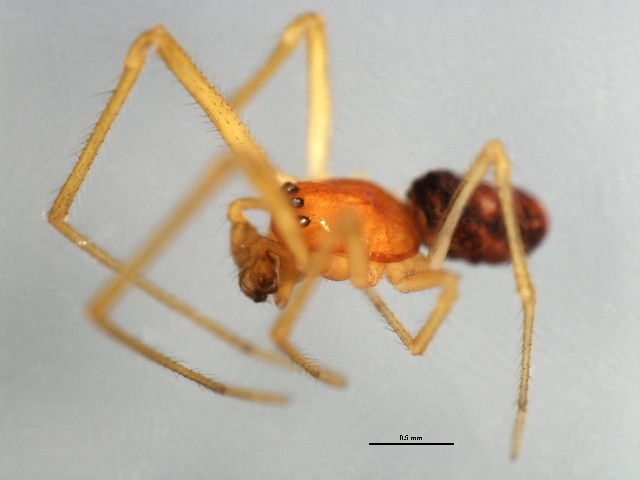
- R. aurantius, male

Scientific classification
- Domain: Eukaryota
- Kingdom: Animalia
- Phylum: Arthropoda
- Subphylum: Chelicerata
- Class: Arachnida
- Order: Araneae
- Infraorder: Araneomorphae
- Family: Theridiidae
- Genus: Rugathodes
- Species: R. aurantius

Binomial name
- Rugathodes aurantius (Emerton, 1915)

= Rugathodes aurantius =

Species of spider

Rugathodes aurantius is a species of cobweb spider in the family Theridiidae. It is found in North America and Northern Russia.
