= Costemilophus =

Scientific classification
- Kingdom: Animalia
- Phylum: Arthropoda
- Class: Insecta
- Order: Coleoptera
- Suborder: Polyphaga
- Infraorder: Cucujiformia
- Family: Cerambycidae
- Genus: Costemilophus
- Species: C. aurantius

Binomial name
- Costemilophus aurantius Galileo & Martins, 2005

Genus of beetles

Costemilophus aurantius is a species of beetle in the family Cerambycidae, and the only species in the genus Costemilophus. It was described by Galileo and Martins in 2005.
