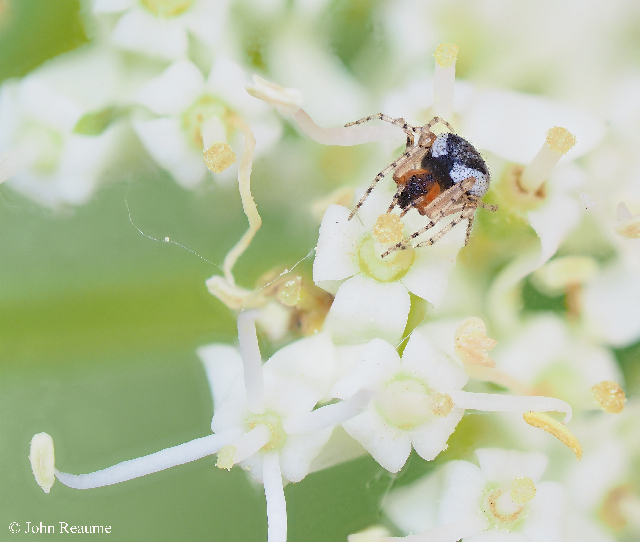
- W. crispulus

Scientific classification
- Kingdom: Animalia
- Phylum: Arthropoda
- Subphylum: Chelicerata
- Class: Arachnida
- Order: Araneae
- Infraorder: Araneomorphae
- Family: Theridiidae
- Genus: Wamba; O. Pickard-Cambridge, 1896

Type species
- W. congener O. Pickard-Cambridge, 1896

Species
- W. congener O. Pickard-Cambridge, 1896 – USA, Caribbean to Argentina; W. crispulus (Simon, 1895) – Canada to Brazil, Caribbean; W. panamensis (Levi, 1959) – Panama, Ecuador

Synonyms
- Allodipoena Bryant, 1947; Chindellum Archer, 1950

= Wamba (spider) =

Genus of spiders

Wamba is a genus of comb-footed spiders that was first described by Octavius Pickard-Cambridge in 1896. As of September 2019 it contains three species, found in the Americas, including the Caribbean: W. congener, W. crispulus, and W. panamensis.
