= One and Only (book series) =

Children's book series by K.A. Applegate

- The One and Only Ivan; The One and Only Bob; The One and Only Ruby; The One and Only Family
- Author: Katherine Applegate
- Country: United States
- Language: English
- Publisher: Harper Collins
- Published: 2012
- No. of books: 4

The One and Only is a series of middle-grade novels written by Katherine Applegate and illustrated by Patricia Castelao. The series consists of four books: The One and Only Ivan (2012), The One and Only Bob (2020), The One and Only Ruby (2023) and The One and Only Family (2024). The books are inspired by the real-life story of a gorilla named Ivan and center on themes of friendship, empathy and animal welfare.

== Books ==
=== The One and Only Ivan (2012) ===
The One and Only Ivan is the first book in the series. It tells the story of Ivan, a silverback gorilla who lives in a shopping mall exhibit and befriends a baby elephant named Ruby. The novel is narrated from Ivan's point of view and was inspired by the true story of a gorilla who lived in captivity in Washington state. The book won the Newbery Medal in 2013 and has been adapted into a 2020 Disney+ film.

=== The One and Only Bob (2020) ===
The One and Only Bob serves as a sequel and follows Bob, a stray dog who was a supporting character in the first book. The story explores Bob's journey to find courage and his long-lost sister during a hurricane rescue mission.

=== The One and Only Ruby (2023) ===
The One and Only Ruby is the third book in the series. It centers on Ruby, the young elephant introduced in the first book, now living in a wildlife sanctuary. The novel focuses on Ruby's reflections about her past and her efforts to find her voice and sense of belonging.

=== The One and Only Family (2024) ===
The One and Only Family is the fourth book, serving as a conclusion to Ivan's story.

== Film adaptation ==
The One and Only Ivan was adapted into a feature film by The Walt Disney Company, released on Disney+ on August 21, 2020. The film stars the voices of Sam Rockwell as Ivan, Danny DeVito as Bob, and Angelina Jolie as Stella.

== See also ==
- Katherine Applegate
- The One and Only Ivan (film)
