= Grossology =

Grossology may refer to:

- Grossology (book series), by Sylvia Branzei
- Grossology (TV series), a Canadian animated TV series
