= Search for Senna =

Novel by K. A. Applegate

- Author: K. A. Applegate
- Cover artist: Greg Spalenka
- Language: English
- Series: Everworld #1
- Genre: Science fiction novel
- Publisher: Scholastic
- Publication date: July 1999
- Publication place: United States
- Media type: Print
- ISBN: 0-590-87743-7
- Followed by: Everworld #2: Land of Loss

Search for Senna is the first book in the Everworld series, written by K. A. Applegate.

== Plot summary ==
David Levin, the narrator of the book, is the new kid in his school. He gets in a fight with Christopher Hitchcock after being seen going out with his girlfriend, Senna Wales. Jalil, a fellow student, and Senna's half-sister, April O'Brien, appear in the scene, which marks the point where four of the main characters first get together. The next day, early in the morning all four are mysteriously drawn to Senna, who is sitting next to a lake. Suddenly, without a warning all five of them are sucked into a different world which is called Everworld.

David, Christopher, Jalil and April wake up in the captivity of Norse god Loki, who claims to have opened the portal into the "Old World" so that his son, Fenrir, could bring Senna, who he calls a witch, to him. He reveals that he intended to use her as a gateway to the Old World. After Loki realizes the four cannot help him, he orders their death, but their escape due to David's heroic actions with a sword, and the laws of the universe (such as the rate of acceleration) not working as they would in the Old World (which the group calls the "real world").

The group take refuge in a Viking camp posing as minstrels, and are sheltered by Olaf Ironfoot (the leader) as a defiance to Loki. The Vikings sail to war, along with David, Christopher, Jalil and April, against the Aztecs and their heart-eating god Huitzilopoctli. The Vikings inform them that Loki will release their God, Odin One-Eye, the ransom being Huitzilopoctli's head. They intend to kill him using Thor's hammer Mjolnir.

The book ends at the beginning of the battle, where David, Christopher, Jalil and the Viking men appear to be winning against the Aztecs. It ends with the appearance of Huitzilopoctli, who has arrived to join the battle.

== See also ==
- Everworld
