= Nick Davis (visual effects supervisor) =

American visual effects supervisor

- Occupation: Visual effects supervisor
- Years active: 1992-present

Nick Davis is an American visual effects supervisor who has worked in visual effects since the early 1990s. He was nominated at the 81st Academy Awards for The Dark Knight, which he shared with Chris Corbould, Paul Franklin and Tim Webber. Davis was also nominated at the 93rd Academy Awards for The One and Only Ivan, which he shared with Greg Fisher, Ben Jones and Santiago Colomo Martinez.

== Filmography ==
Davis worked on the following films as visual effects supervisor:

- Batman Forever (1995)
- Harry Potter and the Philosopher's Stone (2001)
- Harry Potter and the Chamber of Secrets (2002)
- Troy (2004)
- Charlie and the Chocolate Factory (2005)
- The Dark Knight (2008)
- Clash of the Titans (2010)
- Wrath of the Titans (2012)
- Edge of Tomorrow (2014)
