= The One and Only Ivan (film) =

2020 American fantasy film

- Official release poster
- Directed by: Thea Sharrock
- Screenplay by: Mike White
- Based on: The One and Only Ivan by Katherine Applegate
- Produced by: Angelina Jolie; Allison Shearmur; Brigham Taylor
- Starring: Sam Rockwell; Angelina Jolie; Danny DeVito; Helen Mirren; Brooklynn Prince; Ramón Rodríguez; Ariana Greenblatt; Chaka Khan; Ron Funches; Phillipa Soo; Mike White; Bryan Cranston
- Cinematography: Florian Ballhaus
- Edited by: Barney Pilling
- Music by: Craig Armstrong
- Production companies: Walt Disney Pictures; Jolie Pas Productions
- Distributed by: Walt Disney Studios Motion Pictures
- Release date: August 21, 2020 (United States)
- Running time: 95 minutes
- Country: United States
- Language: English

The One and Only Ivan is a 2020 American fantasy comedy-drama film directed by Thea Sharrock and written by Mike White based on the 2012 children's book by Katherine Applegate. Inspired by the true story of Ivan the gorilla, the film stars the voices of Sam Rockwell as Ivan alongside Angelina Jolie (who helped Allison Shearmur and Brigham Taylor to produce the film), Danny DeVito, Helen Mirren, Brooklynn Prince, Chaka Khan, Ron Funches, Phillipa Soo, and White, with the human characters portrayed by Ramón Rodríguez, Ariana Greenblatt, and Bryan Cranston.

The project was first announced in 2014, and went into production two years later. The cast was assembled between October 2017 and May 2018, with filming taking place in Florida in summer 2018. Originally intended to have a theatrical release, The One and Only Ivan was made available to stream on Disney+ from August 21, 2020, and received mixed reviews from critics. The film received nominations from both BAFTA and the Academy Awards for its visual effects, but lost both to Tenet.

The film was dedicated in memory of Allison Shearmur who died of lung cancer on January 19, 2018.

The film was removed from Disney+ on May 26, 2023, amidst a Disney+ and Hulu content purge as part of a broader cost cutting initiative under Disney CEO Bob Iger. It was, however, re-released on multiple video-on-demand platforms on September 26, 2023.

== Plot ==
For 20 years, Ivan the gorilla has been the star attraction at the Big Top Mall and Video Arcade, a circus inside a Central Florida shopping mall run by ringmaster Mack. Living in captivity with his fellow animal performers — wise elephant Stella, spoiled poodle Snickers, spunky baseball-playing chicken Henrietta, toy fire truck-riding rabbit Murphy, anxious sea lion Frankie, and loquacious parrot Thelma — Ivan befriends a stray mutt who lives in his enclosure. The animals' caretaker George often brings his daughter Julia who bonds with Ivan. Giving Ivan her old crayons, she is able to decipher his drawings and names the stray dog Bob.

Losing business at the mall, Mack acquires a baby elephant named Ruby from a bankrupt circus. She draws in crowds and becomes the new headliner, but a jealous Ivan is hesitant to accept her. When Stella becomes weaker and unable to perform, Ivan encourages a nervous Ruby to embrace the crowd on her own. He later explains how Mack and his wife Helen adopted him as a baby. As Ivan got bigger, his animalistic behavior drove Helen away, and Mack eventually purchased the mall and turned it into a circus. Asking Ivan to ensure Ruby has a free life, Stella dies.

As Mack trains Ruby for the circus, Ivan decides to free her. Julia shows Ivan's drawings to Mack, who publicizes them as the next big act, but despite the new crowd gathered to see him draw, Ivan refuses to cooperate. That night, Ivan and Bob trick the security guard Castello and free the animals, though Snickers prefers to stay. The others escape across the highway at the cost of Murphy's fire truck, but discover the nearby "forest" is an intersection surrounded by more city.

After being called by Castello, who mentioned that he was locked inside Ivan's cage and that none of the animals were in the mall, Mack finds the animals back and takes them back to the mall after mentioning to Ivan that Ruby would be at risk outside. He later tells George to keep their escape a secret while mentioning that he fired Castello. Ivan tells Ruby about life in the jungle with other gorillas where he loved to draw with mud and play with his sister Tag until poachers killed his father and captured Ivan.

Mack and George prepare for the day's entertainment, Murphy gains a new yellow fire truck off camera and complains to Henrietta that "no one drives a yellow fire truck" while Frankie apologizes to his ball for leaving him. With finger paint from Julia, Ivan paints a mural in his enclosure. TV reporter Candace Taylor arrives to question Mack about the rumored escape. He dismisses it, noting that the animals are currently inside the building and persuades her to film the show, where he and the audience are astonished by Ivan's mural of his jungle home. Julia believes that Ivan wants to be free. With Candace's help, she rallies public support. Protestors arrive, demanding the animals' release, and Mack agrees to shut down the circus.

As Henrietta, Murphy, Thelma, and Frankie are taken away, Mack says goodbye to Ivan, thanking him for their time together. Dr. Maya Wilson relocates Ivan to an expansive gorilla habitat at Zoo Atlanta, where he is reunited with other gorillas. He discovers that he is situated right next to the elephant enclosure where Ruby now lives with her kind. Ivan assures Stella's spirit that Ruby is free.

During the credits, photos and footage of the real Ivan are shown with a summary of his life. As the credits continue rolling, Ivan is greeted by Bob, now adopted by Julia and George, who have come with Mack to visit the animals.

== Cast ==
- Bryan Cranston as Mack, the owner and ringmaster of the Big Top Mall.
- Ramón Rodríguez as George, the janitor and animal caregiver at the Big Top Mall.
- Ariana Greenblatt as Julia, George's daughter who encourages Ivan to draw.
- Owain Arthur as Castello, a security guard at the Big Top Mall who Mack often orders to keep Bob out.
- Hannah Bourne as Helen, Mack's ex-wife who left when Ivan got older.
- Eleanor Matsuura as Candace Taylor, a news reporter who covers Ivan's finger-painting.
- Indira Varma as Dr. Maya Wilson, a zoologist at Zoo Atlanta.

Mike White cameos as a passing driver who witnesses the animals escaping into the intersection.

=== Voices ===
- Sam Rockwell as Ivan, a western lowland gorilla who was rescued at a young age by Mack and takes up drawing.
- Angelina Jolie as Stella, a wise African bush elephant and Ivan's friend.
- Danny DeVito as Bob, a stray dog and Ivan's best friend who often sneaks into the Big Top Mall, much to the annoyance of Mack.
- Helen Mirren as Snickers, a spoiled white poodle owned by Mack who often performs with Stella.
- Brooklynn Prince as Ruby, a baby African bush elephant who Mack obtains from a bankrupt circus.
- Chaka Khan as Henrietta, a spunky Polish chicken who plays baseball. Henrietta is exclusive to the film.
- Ron Funches as Murphy, a white European rabbit who wears a red bow tie and drives a toy fire truck. Murphy is exclusive to the film.
- Phillipa Soo as Thelma, a loquacious blue-and-yellow macaw who mostly quotes "It's all under control".
- Mike White as Frankie, a paranoid California sea lion who balances a ball. Frankie is exclusive to the film.

== Production ==
On April 9, 2014, it was announced that Walt Disney Pictures was set to adapt the book with Allison Shearmur producing. On May 6, 2016, it was announced that Mike Newell would direct, with a screenplay by Mike White. On March 24, 2017, Thea Sharrock entered negotiations to direct the film after Newell left the project. On October 16, 2017, it was reported that Jolie had joined the film as both a producer and the voice of an elephant named Stella. On November 15, 2017, Prince was cast to voice Ruby, the baby elephant.

On January 9, 2018, Ariana Greenblatt joined the cast in a live action role. Producer Shearmur died on January 19, 2018. She retains her producer credit on the film. On February 23, 2018, Rockwell was cast to voice the titular Ivan, Cranston was set to play a circus owner, and Brigham Taylor joined as a producer. On March 13, 2018, Rodriguez signed on to another live action role, that of the father of Greenblatt's character. On May 1, 2018, it was announced that DeVito and Mirren would voice characters in the film, while Indira Varma and Eleanor Matsuura were added in live action roles.

Principal photography began on May 1, 2018, in Lakeland, Florida, with locations for the film including the Southgate Shopping Center and Resurrection Catholic Church. Filming also took place in other parts of Polk County the following month, spending $134,365 in the city.

The visual effects for the film were done by Moving Picture Company (MPC) and Method Studios.

== Release ==
The film was originally scheduled for a theatrical release on August 14, 2020, by Walt Disney Studios Motion Pictures. However, due to the impact of the COVID-19 pandemic on cinema, the film's theatrical release was cancelled and it was exclusively released on Disney+ on August 21, 2020.

The film was removed from Disney+ on May 26, 2023, as part of The Walt Disney Company's purging of select content titles from Disney+ and Hulu. In response to backlash surrounding this, it was re-released digitally on multiple platforms including Amazon Prime Video, Vudu and Google Play on September 26, 2023.

== Reception ==
=== Audience viewership ===
According to ScreenEngine/ASI, The One and Only Ivan was the 27th-most watched straight-to-streaming title of 2020, as of November 2020.

=== Critical response ===
On review aggregator Rotten Tomatoes, the film holds an approval rating of 71% based on 117 reviews with an average rating of 6.2/10. The website's critics consensus reads, "An uncertain approach to the story's darker themes undermines its emotional stakes, but The One and Only Ivan offers heartwarming entertainment for younger viewers." On Metacritic, the film has a weighted average score of 58 out of 100, based on reviews from 25 critics, indicating "mixed or average reviews".

Petrana Radulovic of Polygon found the movie strongly emotional across the different relationships between the characters, praised the film for its realistic take on captivity, claiming it does not engage with clichés, and called the visual effects realistic. Owen Gleiberman of Variety found the visual effects of the movie very impressive and praised the performances of the voice actors, and stated that the story manages to be emotional and sincere despite not providing surprising twists. Ben Kenigsberg of The New York Times applauded the performances of the voice actors and complimented the visual effects, claimed that the film engages with lessons dealing with the suffering experienced from loss, while saying that the story line remains generic.

Richard Roeper of the Chicago Sun-Times rated the film 3 out of 4 stars, stating, "The One and Only Ivan has its share of snappy (and sometimes sappy) animal banter that might have the grown-ups rolling their eyes while their little ones lap it up, but this is a sweet and lovely story with seamless blending of CGI and live action, fantastically funny and warm voice work from an all-star cast and a cool epilogue." Sandie Angulo Chen of Common Sense Media rated the movie 4 out of 5 stars, praised the educational value of the film related to the difficulties encountered by gorillas in their natural habitat, and applauded the presence of positive messages and role models, writing, "The story promotes getting circus animals out of cages and into more natural habitats at zoos and preserves. It also has themes of loyalty, teamwork, empathy, and perseverance."

Shikha Desai of The Times of India rated the film 3 out of 5 stars, praised the visual effects and the performances of the voice actors, and found it emotional. Kate Erbland of IndieWire gave the movie a "B" rating, applauded the performances of the voice actors and the visual effects, and found the movie emotional, stating, "While the film was originally bound for a theatrical release (and likely would have looked spectacular on the big screen), it's a smart fit for Disney's own streaming service, guaranteed to inspire heady questions (and necessary movie-watching pauses) from its most curious viewers."

=== Accolades ===
Year	Award	Category	Recipient(s)	Result	Ref.
2020	Hollywood Post Alliance Awards	Outstanding Visual Effects - Feature Film	Nick Davis, Greg Fisher, Ben Aghdami, Ben Jones, Santiago Colomo	Won	
2021	Academy Awards	Best Visual Effects	Nick Davis, Greg Fisher, Ben Jones and Santiago Colomo Martínez	Nominated	
2021	British Academy Film Awards	Best Special Visual Effects	Santiago Colomo Martinez, Nick Davis, Greg Fisher	Nominated	
2021	Hollywood Music in Media Awards	Best Original Song in an Animated Film	"Free" – Diane Warren	Nominated	
2021	Visual Effects Society Awards	Outstanding Animated Character in a Photoreal Feature	Valentina Rosselli, Thomas Huizer, Andrea De Martis, William Bell (for Ivan)	Won	
