= Remnants (novel series) =

Science fiction book series by K. A. Applegate

- The cover of the first book in the series, The Mayflower Project.
- Author: K. A. Applegate
- Country: United States
- Language: English
- Genre: Science fiction, post-apocalyptic
- Published: 2001–2003
- Media type: Print: paperback
- No. of books: 14

Remnants is a series of 14 young adult science fiction books co-authored by Katherine Applegate and her husband Michael Grant, writing together under the name K. A. Applegate, published between July 2001 and September 2003. The series centres around a group of humans launched into space in a desperate attempt to survive following an asteroid collision with the Earth.

== Plot summary ==
In book one, a 76-mile (122 km)-long asteroid is on a collision course with Earth, which will kill the vast majority of all living things. Eighty people – mostly top scientists and their families – have been chosen to make a desperate escape in the Mayflower, a converted space ship which will use solar sails and experimental suspended animation. A chunk of the asteroid breaks off and destroys San Francisco. Some people who were not chosen to leave Earth kill some of the chosen crew so they can take their places on board the Mayflower. Others are stowaways. Most people on board are put into suspended animation, and the ship barely leaves in time, before the asteroid strikes.

In book two, most of the passengers on the Mayflower wake up and find the ship is somehow within a building. Something went wrong with the suspended animation, causing about twenty people, mostly adults, to die. The survivors, many of them now orphaned teenagers, call themselves Remnants. They discover alien races / species in the building, along with deadly parasitic worms. They must fight to learn what is going on and to survive. Eventually, Jobs realizes they are inside a colossal space craft.

In book three, the Remnants learn the space craft has an artificial intelligence called Mother, that Mother is confused, and the confusion is causing problems with the indoor environment. The Remnants must learn to communicate with and hopefully get along with the various alien races / species, in order to fix Mother.

== Characters ==
=== Main characters ===
- Jobs: He and his parents and brother are on the Mayflower: only Jobs and his brother survive. Jobs's poetic sense and technical knowledge combined are often useful in understanding Mother, a sentient machine. It is Jobs who discovers the remains of Earth. He chose to use the name Jobs because unlike Bill Gates or Michael Dell, Steven Jobs created a miniature revolution "...in his garage." Jobs's birth name is Sebastian Andreeson. He was the son of a prominent scientist, Jennifer Andreeson, head of astrophysics at Stanford, and Tony Andreeson, a software technician with the "kind of job where nobody expects you to show up on time, or at all," and was recruited to go on the Mayflower Project. He was joined by his long-time best friend Mo'Steel. He was briefly romantically involved with a girl named Cordelia before he went aboard the Mayflower project, and the first book of Remnants deals with his longing for her to accompany him on the ship. Cordelia instead comes to an infamous death when her video link reveals to the world a chunk of The Rock obliterating San Francisco and its inhabitants, with the resulting shockwave shattering the building from which Cordelia witnesses the destruction.
- Mo'Steel: Jobs's best friend, Mo'Steel is named for either "Man of Steel" or "More Steel" (Mo cannot remember which), since he has broken 5 of his bones. 4 of them so were broken so badly, they had been replaced with titanium composites. Mo'Steel has a love for adventure and is proud of all his broken bones and scars. Mo marries Noyze in the series' epilogue, and has 1 son Boyd, and Noyze is pregnant with another. Mo'Steel's birth name is Romeo Gonzalez. Mo'Steel is possibly an idiot-savant; however, evidence can only be found in the second book when he converts an insane number of minutes into years.
- 2Face: Named after the comic book villain, Two-Face. She is one of 2 players battling for total control of the Remnants. 2Face seems to show feelings for Billy, but upon being stranded on Earth, she becomes paranoid to the point that she is sure Billy orchestrated the entire event. She attempts to kill Billy to stop the re-greening ritual, and Billy is forced to kill her to protect himself, but not before he gives her a vision of her dead mother so that she may die peacefully. It is hinted several times through the series that 2Face herself caused the fire that scarred her, but this is not confirmed.
- Yago: The son of the first African-American, and first female President of the United States (Janice Castleman), Yago is 2Face's competition for control. He is highly arrogant and is assured he will eventually rise to power, caring for his own safety above all else. About halfway through the series, Yago is connected to Mother and is "killed" (actually, a projection of his mind is killed). The ordeal leaves Yago believing himself to be "The One": A being of purity, destined to lead the Chosen (the non-mutant Remnants) and to destroy the Freaks (2Face and the mutated Remnants). Yago's twisted religion turns many Blue Meanies with his newly discovered mutation "The Touch", a sort of laying-on-hands that several Meanies crave (although it is not known exactly what The Touch really does - only that it does not work on humans). Near the end of his life Yago becomes much more likeable and not arrogant. Yago dies when his mind, inside of Tate, fades away. Yago's birth name is Robert Castleman.
- Violet Blake: Violet is a "Jane" (named for Jane Austen), who for the first half of the series, prefers to be called Miss Blake. As a Jane, Violet has a distaste for technology, and a love for all forms of art and literature. Violet suffers an attack of "worms" in the second book, and eventually they become her mutation, enabling her to become a mass of worms that can revive the dead (to an extent). Violet and Jobs have a semi-romantic relationship, but her disgust over her mutation, and Jobs's obsession with Earth, drive them apart. She marries the Marauder Sanchez in the end of the book. Violet's birth name is Dallas, the place of her birth.
- Billy Weir: Billy is a true enigma. Originally a Chechen orphan, Billy was adopted by a Texan family. He was born Russian, but his father, Billy Weir Senior, aka, Big Bill, changed his name to Billy. At times it seems that Billy has infinite power, and has a strong connection with Mother. Early in the series he was carried around the computer generated world by Jobs thereby fusing friendship with Jobs that is persistent throughout the series. Long before the Mayflower, Billy dreamt of events that would unfold over five centuries later. While in hibernation, Billy did not sleep, and was awake for the five-hundred-year journey. The ordeal twisted his mind, giving him telekinesis, the power to levitate, and many other strange abilities. In the fourth book, he moves Wylson Lefkowitz-Blake's dead body like an oversized marionette, freaking Mo'Steel out big-time. These abilities make Billy a match for Mother, to the point where they assimilate to become one. Billy dies in the re-greening ritual: it is possible he may have survived, but 2Face's attack and the subsequent energy Billy spends to drain her life force may have contributed to his death. He is dubbed "Billy Weird" by many of his enemies (which amounts to anyone seeking control of the ship).
- Tate: Tate is one of the teenage survivors of the Mayflower. She is a relatively unimportant character until the seventh book, and most of the thirteenth book is about her. Tate developed a mutation called "the mouth", which causes her head to grow to a monstrous size when she feels threatened, and accidentally eats Yago, Charlie, and Amelia, who continue to live inside Tate until she dies or they die a natural death. In the earlier books Tate shows feelings for Mo'Steel and tells him that he's holding the Remnants together.
- Tamara Hoyle: A Marine who was not intended to board the Mayflower shuttle, she was trapped on board when the ship launched, and she was given the berth of a passenger who had been killed before boarding the ship. Tamara was pregnant when she was placed in her berth, and is rejuvenated with the Baby Te at her side. For the first part of the series she is mind-controlled by Te. After Te is defeated, Tamara takes a keen interest in the defense of the Remnants. She is killed by Blue Meanies on the trip back to Earth.
- The Troika: Amelia, Duncan Choate, and Charlie Langlow, are a trio of humans living in what is called "The Basement", a dark area that is very much what it sounds: an area below Mother's main deck. All of them "ascend" to become slime-like shapeshifters. Amelia and Charlie are assimilated into Tate, and Duncan is killed.
- D-Caf: D-Caf wasn't supposed to be on the Mayflower. But he and his brother, Mark, stowed away on board the ship. Mark attacked Tamara and was killed by her. Jobs, who wasn't in his hibernation booth yet, heard the commotion and subdued D-Caf, but not before D-Caf shot one of the two pilots. Ultimately, D-Caf was given the spot. When the surviving Remnants woke up, D-Caf ended up hanging out with Yago because no one else liked him. He spends the majority of the series following Yago and Anamull. When the Blue Meanies attacked, D-Caf was killed and given Violet's worm mutation. Along with the remaining Remnants, except Tate, he was abandoned by Yago. Although he's not mentioned in the epilogue, D-Caf survived and lived to see the new Earth.
- Kubrick: The fifteen-year-old son of one of the Mayflower's engineers, Kubrick was skinned by Mother to look more like her creators. He is introduced in the fifth book, where he and his father find Billy and Mo'Steel in the "basement". In the series, he shows definite feelings for 2Face. He is killed in the ninth book by Charlie saving 2Face's life.
- Echo: An Alpha colony inhabitant, Echo is not genetically pure, and this shows in her blind baby. She is forced to flee the Alpha colony and seek refuge with the Marauders. Her child, Lumina, becomes one of 3 elements in the re-greening of Earth.
- Sanchez: Sanchez is the Marauder who was granted visions by the Source, which is later revealed to be Mother. After the Remnants and Marauders win against the Savagers, Sanchez receives a call from Mother telling the humans to come to the source. Through Billy, Sanchez saw what elements were needed to perform the ritual that would restore Earth.
- Noyze: Born Jessica Polk, Noyze, the daughter of a novelist and an orthopedic surgeon, was mostly deaf until age 12, then received surgery that restored her hearing to its full capacity. Noyze and Dr Cohen were abandoned on the ship by the other Remnants and kidnapped by Blue Meanies. Noyze is the only Remnant who can communicate with the Blue Meanies.
- Newton: Hawk's brother, the former leader of the Marauders after he's killed by Mo'Steel. Right from the start, Newton plotted to kill Mo'Steel and become leader himself. He tried to have D-Caf poisoned by Balder and Olga to be killed by Rattler, both of which fail. Then his attempt to kill Mo'Steel was foiled by Edward. After Newton failed to steal Lumina, Newton fled; his ultimate fate is never revealed.
- Te: Initially called "The Baby", Te appears first as the young child of Tamara Hoyle, who was born on the 500-year journey. After some time, however, it becomes clear that the Baby is not human, and is furthermore controlling Tamara's mind. After absorbing the energy of several Blue Meanies, Te transforms into a Shipwright and attempts to seize control of Mother. However, Billy defeats him by joining with Mother. Te is notably the only Shipwright to appear.
- Mother: Both a computer and a ship, Mother is so highly advanced that she is self-aware, or at least is able to give the impression that she is, and experiences loneliness after her creators, the Shipwrights, abandoned her and left her alone for a six hundred years. The long years alone in space have damaged her system: she must have maintenance every 200 cycles, and has been alone for 600 (although it is not specified exactly how long a cycle is). The long years of no new input drove Mother mad, and when the Mayflower is found, she eagerly awakes the Remnants to absorb new information. Mother eventually merges with Billy. When Billy and she are disconnected, she suffers a computer virus from the Troika, and is degraded into Daughter, a simplified form of herself. Mother the Ship crashes on Earth, and becomes known as the Source to the Marauders.

=== Other characters ===
- Mark Melman: Mark was D-Caf's older brother and foster father. The two of them weren't supposed to be on the Mayflower, but they stowed away in some space suits. Mark attacked and wounded Tamara but was killed by her before she lost consciousness.
- Jasper Willett: Colonel Jasper Willett was the Mayflower commander. When one of the Mayflower's solar sail's is damaged, Willett talks Jobs and Mo'Steel how to fix it. But shortly afterward, he used the gun D-Caf had used earlier to kill himself, presumably because he couldn't live without his family. When Jobs, Mo'Steel and 2Face woke up on Mother, they found Willett's skeleton.
- Connie Huerta: Doctor Connie Huerta was one of the Mayflower passengers who survived hibernation. Before departing, Connie offered to let Tamara take her place on the Mayflower to give her baby a chance at life; Tamara was pregnant at the time. Shortly after waking up, Jobs found Tamara with her baby, and the umbilical cord still attached. Connie died when the baby attacked her in her attempt to cut the cord.
- Errol Smith: Errol was one of the Mayflower passengers who survived hibernation. He was one of the rocket scientists who put the Mayflower together. He was one of the first of the Remnants to suggest that they'd somehow been captured as there were no signs of reentry damage. But shortly afterward, the Remnants were attacked by the Riders, who challenged Errol to a duel and killed him.
- William "Big Bill" Weir: Big Bill was Billy's adopted father. He woke up from his berth with T.R.; Big Bill being infested with worms at the time. When Jobs, Violet and Mo'Steel tried to save him, one of the worms escaped and got into Violet's finger, prompting Jobs and Mo'Steel to cut off her finger. Ultimately Billy killed Big Bill to save him from a slow death. Big Bill reappears as projection to the Remnants as a projection by Billy while he spoke with Mother.
- Shy Hwang: Shy Hwang was 2Face's father. Before the Rock hit, Shy was an ABC producer in Miami who blackmailed the Mayflower Project to get his family places on board and a chance at life. After Shy found his wife dead, he remained depressed for the rest of his time on board Mother. Shy was finally killed by a Blue Meanie aboard the Constitution.
- Wylson Lefkowitz-Blake: Wylson was the CEO of Microsoft who survived hibernation aboard the Mayflower. Yago appointed her leader of the Remnants; he intended to usurp her later. When Tamara demanded a sacrifice for the baby, 2Face arranged with Yago for Wylson to be fed. Wylson was saved when the node was destroyed and their current environment replaced to its default setting. During the battle on the Constitution, a massive wave threw her overboard. Mo'Steel had jumped into the water to save her and Billy, who had been thrown into the water by Tamara. Mo'Steel managed to reach Billy but was too late to help Wylson.
- Alberto DiSalvo: Alberto was one of the scientists who designed the Mayflower's solar sails. He and his son, Kubrick, woke up earlier and fell back asleep. Alberto would wake up to find his son mutated by Mother. The two met up with Mo'Steel and Billy and found one of the chairs that interfaced with Mother. Alberto sat in the chair and got his brain scrambled. Shortly afterward, Mother would kill Alberto in the Blue Meanies base.
- T.R.: Tathagata "T.R." Rajagopalchari was one of the survivors aboard the Mayflower. He woke along with a worm-infested Big Bill. T.R. was silent for the majority of his part with the Remnants. When Billy enforced the Big Compromise, T.R. had him make a helicopter for him. T.R. was killed by Blue Meanies who were searching for Yago. Their fire missed Edward and hit him. T.R. was the first of the Remnants to be honored with a proper burial.
- Angelique Cohen: Doctor Cohen was one of survivors on board the Mayflower. She was kidnapped by the Blue Meanies along with Noyze. Throughout her part in the series, Doctor Cohen was obsessed with finding her husband, Alan Carrington. When Noyze set off to negotiate with the Blue Meanies, they attacked them and placed a device on Doctor Cohen that looked into her memories and drove her insane. Doctor Cohen was later killed by the Blue Meanies in the attack that followed.
- Daniel Burroway: Burroway was one of the survivors on board the Mayflower who lost his entire family. He constantly fought among the other Remnants and respected no one except Wylson. Burroway was the Remnants' first casualty when they landed on Earth. He was killed by a pillar of flame.
- Anamull: Anamull was one of the younger survivors on board the Mayflower. Yago recruited Anamull as his bodyguard; Anamull spent most of the series following Yago though he secretly thought he was nuts. Yago would abandon Anamull along with the other remaining Remnants on Earth with the Riders and Blue Meanies. Anamull provoked a fight and killed two of the Meanies. He then isolated himself from the others and was able to make a fire. But he was ultimately accidentally devoured by D-Caf, who was just trying to scare him, in his worm form.
- Rodger Dodger: Rodger Dodger was one of the younger survivors aboard the Mayflower. He wasn't very important until he accompanied Tate and D-Caf on several Rider boards. He grew very bored of living quietly with Tate and Tamara when Billy enforced the Big Compromise. He snuck into the Violet's house and killed himself while playing with a Rider Boomerang. Violet brought him back to life in using her concealed mutation.
- Olga: Mo'Steel's mother, who tries to keep Mo'Steel from danger without much success, though she's used to his dangerous antics. Olga made it her business to take care of the Remnants whenever one of them was injured. She befriended the Marauder, Aga, and the two lived together in the new Earth for a time before Aga died.
- Edward: Jobs's six-year-old brother who gains the power to blend into his surrounding environment until he's practically invisible. When Wylson abandons Violet, Jobs asks 2Face to look after Edward. Edward's power proves very useful when he stops Newton from killing Mo'Steel. Edward was one of the few to survive to see the new Earth.

=== List of humans ===
During the escape from earth, eighty humans were on board the Mayflower. However, some diverged into other species. Of the Eighty that set out, only eight survived. 22 died on board the Mayflower, one was killed before the Mayflower set off, the two "pilots" were killed before the hibernation happened, and 27 died of other causes.

Name	Age	Occupation and hometown	Gender	Status
Jasper Willett		Mayflower captain	Male	Deceased; suicide. Couldn't live without his family.
Tony Andreeson	43	Software aestheticist, Monterey	Male	Deceased; died on board the Mayflower
Jennifer Andreeson	40	Astrophysics professor, Monterey	Female	Deceased; died on board the Mayflower
Sebastian "Jobs" Andreeson	14	Student, Monterey	Male	Alive
Edward Andreeson	6	Student, Monterey	Male	Alive
Mr. Gonzalez	39	Monterey	Male	Deceased; died on board the Mayflower
Olga Gonzalez	30	Biologist, Monterey	Female	Alive
Romeo "Mo'Steel" Gonzalez	14	Student, Monterey	Male	Alive
Shy Hwang	42	Producer for ABC, Miami	Male	Deceased; killed aboard the Constitution by Blue Meanies in battle
Dawn Schultz-Hwang	40	Miami	Female	Deceased; one of the missing five who was absorbed by Billy.
Essence "2Face" Hwang	15	Student, Miami	Female	Deceased; killed by Billy because she attempted to kill him
William "Big Bill" Weir	56	CEO, Austin	Male	Deceased; killed by Billy when Bill was infected with worm-like parasites
Jessica Weir	37		Female	Deceased; died on board the Mayflower
Ruslan "Billy" Weir	14	Student, Austin	Male	Deceased; killed indirectly by 2Face, she weakened him, making him unable to survive the regreening ritual
Mr. Blake	40	Monterey	Male	Deceased; died on board the Mayflower via worms
Wylson Lefkowitz-Blake	38	CEO of Wyllco Inc., Monterey	Female	Deceased; drowned
Dallas "Violet" Blake	14	Student, Monterey	Female	Alive
Mr. Huerta			Male	Deceased; died on board the Mayflower
Connie Huerta		Obstetrician	Female	Deceased; killed by Tamara and the Baby when she cut the connection between the baby and the mother
Robert "Yago" Castleman	15	Student (President's son), Washington, D.C.	Male	Deceased; Tate firstly ate him and then he died inside her out of old age
Daniel Burroway		Astrophysicist	Male	Deceased; burned in flame pillar on earth
Mrs. Burroway			Female	Deceased; died on board the Mayflower
Ms. Burroway		Student	Female	Deceased; died on board the Mayflower
Mr. Burroway		Student	Male	Deceased; died on board the Mayflower
Errol Smith		Rocket scientist	Male	Deceased; killed by a Rider in battle
Mrs. Smith			Female	Deceased; died on board the Mayflower
Ms. Smith		Student	Female	Deceased; died on board the Mayflower
Alberto DiSalvo	38	Engineer	Male	Deceased; driven insane and eventually killed by Mother
Mrs. DiSalvo	41		Female	Deceased; died on board the Mayflower
Kubrick DiSalvo	15	Student	Male	Deceased; killed by porcupine-Charlie while saving 2Face (and Billy)
Mr. Dodger			Male	Deceased; died on board the Mayflower
Mrs. Dodger			Female	Deceased; died on board the Mayflower
Roger Dodger	10	Student	Male	Alive
Tate's Father		L.A.	Male	Deceased; died on board the Mayflower
Tate's Mother		L.A.	Female	Deceased; died on board the Mayflower
Tate	14	Student, L.A.	Female	Deceased; crashed Mother on earth
Anamull's father			Male	Deceased; died on board the Mayflower
Anamull's mother			Female	Deceased; died on board the Mayflower
Anamull	16	Student	Male	Deceased; killed by wormy D-Caf on earth. D-Caf was just trying to scare him.
Tathagata "T.R." Rajagopalachari		Psychiatrist	Male	Deceased; killed in battle by Blue Meanies who were searching for Yago.
Mrs. Rajagopalachari			Female	Deceased; died on board the Mayflower
Alan Carrington		Immunologist	Male	Deceased; died on board the Mayflower
Angelique Cohen		Immunologist	Female	Deceased; killed by Riders in battle
Mr. Polk		Orthopedic surgeon	Male	Deceased; died on board the Mayflower
Mrs. Polk		Novelist	Female	Deceased; died on board the Mayflower
Jessica "Noyze" Polk	14	Student	Female	Alive
Amelia		Chicago	Female	Deceased; killed by Tate's suicide mission
Charles "Charlie" Langlow		Reporter	Male	Deceased; driven insane and killed by Tate, Yago, and Amelia
Duncan Choate		Bio-engineering student	Male	Deceased; released into the vacuum of space by Tate with Daughter's help
Tom			Male	Deceased; accidentally shot by D-Caf on the Mayflower
Mark Melman	25		Male	Deceased; shot while hiding on the Mayflower
Harlin "D-Caf" Melman	15	Student	Male	Alive.
Tamara Hoyle	22	Marine, Tennessee	Female	Deceased; killed by Blue Meanies while returning to Earth
Te Hoyle		None (baby)	Male	Deceased; defeated by Billy

List of Marauders

Name	Age	Gender	Status
Hawk		Male	Deceased; killed by Mo'Steel
Rexer		Male	Deceased
Newton		Male	Unknown; presumably dead
Claw		Male	Alive
Snipe		Male	Alive
Balder		Male	Alive
Berg	40	Male	Deceased; died due to a lack of food
Aga	35	Female	Deceased; died in the "new world" on Earth
Eel		Male	Alive
Curia		Female	Alive
Tackie	2	Female	Deceased; killed by Slizzers
Nesia		Female	Alive
Walbert	5	Male	Alive
Micron	5	Male	Alive
Sanchez		Male	Alive
Rattler		Male	Deceased; killed by Mo'Steel in an attempt to kill Olga
Cocker		Male	Alive
Badger		Male	Alive
Croce	10	Male	Alive
Grost		Female	Alive
Yorka		Female	Alive
Prota	7	Female	Alive

=== List of alphas ===
There are 40 alphas; this list is incomplete.

Name	Age	Occupation	Gender	Status
Woody		Leader	Male	Deceased
Borlaug		Elder	Male	deceased
Trinny		Elder	Female	Unknown
Shipper		Elder	Male	Unknown
Ali Kosh		Elder	Male	Unknown
Westie		Elder	Female	Unknown
Nile		Elder	Female	Unknown
Deena		Elder	Female	Unknown
Echo	16		Female	Alive
Lumina		Echo's daughter	Female	Alive
Mattock			Male	Alive
Lyric			Female	Alive
Marina			Female	Unknown
India	3		Female	Unknown
Frank			Male	Deceased
Rainer	67		Male	Deceased
Park			Male	Unknown
Hidge			Male	Unknown

== List of books ==
The following books are in the series:

1. The Mayflower Project (July 2001)
2. Destination Unknown (September 2001)
3. Them (November 2001)
4. Nowhere Land (January 2002)
5. Mutation (March 2002)
6. Breakdown (May 2002)
7. Isolation (July 2002)
8. Mother, May I? (September 2002)
9. No Place Like Home (November 2002)
10. Lost and Found (January 2003)
11. Dream Storm (March 2003)
12. Aftermath (May 2003)
13. Survival (July 2003)
14. Begin Again (September 2003)

== Plots ==
- The Mayflower Project: At the start of the first book, Jobs learns of a seventy-six mile long asteroid on a collision course with Earth. His parents then tell him of a project of eighty people being shipped off into a shuttle with solar sails and hibernation booths. Jobs, along with his best friend Mo'Steel, attempt to give a place to Jobs's crush Cordelia, but learn from her father that she's away in San Francisco. Cordelia later dies when a small piece of the asteroid breaks off and destroys San Francisco. Jobs, Mo'Steel and their parents all get shipped off to the Mayflower along with the rest of the eighty, who are being pursued by a mob who wants to destroy the Mayflower, as well a pair of brothers named Mark and Harlin "D-Caf" Melman, the former of which intends to kill the Mayflower's crew to give him and his brother places on the Mayflower. Shortly before boarding the Mayflower, a gunman kills one of the eighty and the Mayflower takes off with Mark and D-Caf, who have stowed away in spaces suits, and unbeknownst to anyone, a pregnant marine sergeant, Tamara Hoyle. Mark attacks Tamara, but is ultimately killed by her. Jobs hears the commotion and subdues D-Caf, but not before D-Caf accidentally shoots one of the pilots. The Mayflower commander, Colonel Willett realizes that a solar sail has been damaged. While he places Tamara and D-Caf into hibernation booths, Jobs revives Mo'Steel, and the pair of them repair the sail moments before the asteroid hits Earth. The book ends with Jobs and Mo'Steel returning to their berths, but Colonel Willett takes Mark's gun and shoots himself, and everyone falls asleep, all except for an orphan boy named Billy Weir.
- Destination Unknown: Jobs wakes up from hibernation, along with Mo'Steel and a girl named 2Face, and the three of them discover that not everyone has survived, including both Jobs's parents, Mo'Steel's dad and 2Face's mom. Slowly but surely other members of the eighty wake up, including Billy, a girl named Violet Blake and her mother Wylson, the president's son Yago, Mo'Steel's mother, 2Face's dad Shy Hwang, Jobs's brother Edward and others. They soon realize that there's no sign of reentry damage, their environment looks like two famous paintings and two of the "wakers" are killed; Connie Huerta by Tamara's baby and Errol Smith at the hands of a hover-board-riding alien later named Riders. Other members of the eighty emerge, including, D-Caf, a boy named Rodger Dodger, a boy named Anamull, a girl named Tate a man named Burroway. Two others include T.R. and Big Bill Weir, Billy's adopted father. The Remnants learn that Big Bill is infested with worms. When Violet attempts to save him, one worm gets in her finger, prompting Jobs to cut off her finger and Wylson to abandon her; Big Bill is also killed by Billy, who then blacks out. Jobs, Mo'Steel and his mother, Olga stay with Violet and witness another group of aliens entering the environment, which Jobs now realizes is a colossal ship.
- Them: While Jobs's group stays with Violet, the main group of Remnants have found a replica of the Tower of Babel and are attacked by a group of Riders. Tamara battles one of the Riders and strangely manages to kill it. When Wylson remarks on it, Tamara replies, "Everything dies, human." Meanwhile, Jobs and the others get frequently attacked by strange demons that Violet identifies as Bosch's Final Judgement. Along the way, they encounter one of the aliens they saw entering the ship; Mo'Steel had called them Blue Meanies. They attempt to communicate with the Meanie with difficulty, but with help from Billy, they manage to get out of him that his name is Four Sacred Streams and that Mother is confused, which Jobs assumes is the Ship, and that a node must be destroyed, which is creating the environments. Back with the others, 2Face attempts to leave with Edward, having been discriminated by Yago as a freak. She returns to the others and gets attacked by the other Remnants, who decided to feed 2Face to Tamara's baby in order for Tamara to protect them from the Riders, so 2Face bribes Yago so that Wylson will be sacrificed. But the baby doesn't get to eat anyone when Four Sacred Streams destroys the node at the cost of his own life, saving the lives of Jobs's group, but trapping the other Remnants in Mother's default setting, the Riders' home territory.
- Nowhere Land: Jobs and his group reunite with their fellow Remnants, who have barely escaped an attack from the Riders. They find a large creature, that they call a Blimp, swimming through the new environment, a copper colored sea with small islands dotted around it. Using a Rider boomerang provided by D-Caf, Mo'Steel manages to get a hold on the Blimp and help the other Remnants onto the Blimp. Wylson then berates Yago in his attempt to sacrifice her to Tamara's baby and attempts to replace him with Jobs as her new representative for the younger Remnants. 2Face intervenes, claiming that survival is more important. The following day, they're attacked by the Riders again. Billy tries to keep the Blimp moving and several of the Remnants are lucky enough to kill some of the Riders, but they just keep coming. The Remnants hide inside the Blimp itself and escape the Riders but shortly after they leave, the Blimp dies. They swim to one of the islands and spot another one of Mother's replicas, the U.S.S. Constitution, which they commandeer. Later on, they spot a statue infested with Blue Meanies, who are battling squid-like creatures. Having heard of Four Sacred Streams from Jobs, the Remnants attempt to make the Meanies their allies by firing the Constitution's cannons at the statue. Instead, the Blue Meanies angrily return fire on the Remnants, killing Shy Hwang. In the confusion as the Remnants go below decks, Billy is thrown overboard by Tamara and Wylson is also thrown off by a massive wave. Mo'Steel notices the commotion and attempts to save them. Billy manages to take them to safety, but Wylson has drowned. The other Remnants meanwhile are now surrounded by Blue Meanies, completely defenseless.
- Mutation: Mo'Steel and Billy encounter two of the Remnants that they accidentally left behind when they encountered the worms, Alberto Disalvo and his son Kurbick, who has had his skin and nerves surgically removed by Mother. They group together and find a chair linked to Mother, which Alberto sits in, resulting with his mind being scrambled. Meanwhile, the Blue Meanies, who had surrounded the Remnants in the previous book, retreat when Mother creates three ships to attack them and end up attacking the U.S.S. Constitution. The Remnants are saved when Mo'Steel is made a giant by Billy and destroys the ships. Billy then decides to sit the chair and the Remnants find themselves in a new environment, Billy's thoughts. Mo'Steel, Alberto and Kubrick meet up with the rest of the Remnants in a McDonald's, where they are attacked by an army of female warriors, presumably from a comic book Billy read as a kid. They barely manage to escape when they're attacked by Riders and Squids in a replica of Billy's old school. They escape again when the environment changes to Edward Hopper's "Nighthawks". Here they meet an image of Big Bill, created by Billy to communicate with the other Remnants while he interfaces with Mother, who is experiencing sadness from being abandoned by her creators, the Shipwrights; Mother had mutated Kubrick to look more like the Shipwrights.
- Breakdown: Two other Remnants, Noyze and Doctor Cohen have been captured from the Blue Meanies, who are deciding what to do about the humans. Unbeknownst to them, Noyze, who had been deaf for part of her life, understands the sign language of the Meanies. Meanwhile, Mother offers the other Remnants to help her destroy the Blue Meanies, to which Yago willingly volunteers for. He then ends up in one of the chairs and the environment changes to an alternate version of the White House, where Mother provides Yago with a computer generated army from the Civil War. While Jobs, Violet and 2Face follow Yago to the Blue Meanie base, Mo'Steel and Kubrick meet up with Billy and find Yago in one of the chairs linked to Mother. Meanwhile, Yago's strike force is decimated by the Blue Meanies and Jobs notices Tamara's baby absorb one of the Blue Meanies. Kubrick is then able to remove Yago from the chair and place his father into it, but Mother kills him and Billy sends himself, Mo'Steel and Kubrick to the battlefield. With the battle over, 2Face accuses Tamara's baby of being a Shipwright and divides the Remnants into factions to either follow her or the baby. Jobs, Mo'Steel, Violet, Kubrick, Noyze, Olga and Doctor Cohen join 2Face while the rest join the baby. The two groups depart, each with the same destination in mind, the bridge of Mother.
- Isolation: 2Face's group is heading for the bridge of Mother, but Tamara is taking a different course. Tamara meets with the Riders and participates in the Rule of Nine, where she must duel nine Riders to the death at once. Tamara kills the first eight and kills the last one with some slight intervention by Tate. Tamara gains control of the Riders to destroy the Blue Meanies in the baby's name and gain control of Mother. Tate returns to the others and reports her findings to the other Remnants; Tate had come with Yago's group only to protect Tamara, realizing that the baby was controlling her. She then decides to alert Jobs and 2Face of the danger. Along with Rodger Dodger and D-Caf, who decided he wanted a break from Yago, they steal some Rider hover-boards and alert the other Remnants, who have just avoided an attack from Squids, which Billy had indicated were automatons. Tamara arrives with the Riders and attack the Blue Meanies, who have gathered at the bridge. During the battle, the baby absorbs several dead Blue Meanies and takes on the true form of a Shipwright and ascends to the bridge with Tamara, closely followed by Billy, Jobs, Mo'Steel, and Tate. Billy duels the Shipwright while at the same time uses his mind to have Mo'Steel duel Tamara. Ultimately, Billy destroys the Shipwright when Mother intervenes in his favor, freeing Tamara in the process. He then leaves the bridge with Jobs and Mo'Steel (Tate decided to stay with Tamara) and forcefully ends the battle, angering Yago, who vows to destroy Billy.
- Mother, May I?: Billy has enforced the Big Compromise, the aliens are to not attack the Remnants and in exchange the Remnants won't alter Mother's course. Three months later, while exploring Mother's lab, Jobs finds what he believes may be what's left of Earth. Knowing it will break the Big Compromise, he consults Billy, who says he can make Mother return to Earth if the Remnants so choose, and asks Jobs to search Mother's "basement", because Billy can't sense anything in there. While Jobs takes Mo'Steel, Kubrick, Tate, Anamull, Yago, and Tamara to the basement with him, some Blue Meanies attack Violet in her Greek villa and interrogate her about Yago's whereabouts, claiming that he'd been given a custom Blue Meanie weapon and deviating their fellows into turning against them, which attracts 2Face, Edward, and T.R. A small fight commences in which one of the Blue Meanies kills T.R. in an attempt to kill Edward. Violet, infuriated by this senseless act, changes her mind on her opposition of returning to Earth. Meanwhile, Jobs's and his group are attacked by other Blue Meanies searching for Yago. Some are killed by Yago's new weapon but the last one is absorbed by Amelia, one of the missing eighty that vanished from their berths on the Mayflower. She instructs Jobs to tell Billy not to alter Mother's course. However, Billy alters Mother's course before he and the others can deliver the message.
- No Place Like Home: The Remnants are preparing for an inevitable battle with the Blue Meanies, and possibly the Riders. To protect them, Billy constructs a massive wall that only the Remnants can open from the inside. Noyze proposes attempting to negotiate with the aliens but 2Face argues against it. Yago meanwhile, is recruiting Blue Meanies who tell him that their brethren are preparing for a raid to test the Remnants' defenses. But late one night, Noyze and Doctor Cohen sneak out to attempt to negotiate with the aliens. They encounter a Blue Meanie that knocks them out and places a device onto Doctor Cohen that allows it to see into her memories and gather all the information it needs for its fellows to attack the Remnants; the device also badly damages Doctor Cohen's mind. Meanwhile, a man named Charlie is spotted and brought into the Remnants' territory. Olga and Violet restore him to health and Noyze returns with Doctor Cohen. The next day, the Remnants hold their own against a Rider attack but their defenses are decimated by the Blue Meanies. In the battle, it's revealed that Charlie is one of Amelia's two partners sent to kill Billy. He ends up attacking 2Face instead, causing an infuriated Kubrick to attack him. D-Caf is also killed in battle but Violet uses her newly revealed mutation to bring him back to life; she had the power to turn into a swarm of worms ever since waking up and had used it earlier to bring Rodger Dodger back to life after he accidentally killed himself playing with a Rider boomerang. When asked if she's still human, she replies, "Are any of us?"
- Lost and Found: Kubrick and Doctor Cohen are listed as dead at the start of this book and Charlie has returned to Amelia and his other partner, Duncan. Grieved by Kubrick's death, 2Face decides she wants Violet's mutation so she can help her fellow Remnants. When Violet refuses, 2Face deliberately kills herself so Violet will give her the mutation; Violet refused because she had failed to save Tamara after she'd been killed by the Blue Meanies. Tate discovers she has a mutation as well when she spots Yago breaking curfew and her mouth grows big and bites him; Yago is saved only by intervention from Jobs. They arrive on Earth and find that it's nothing but a wasteland with no water and pillars of flames, one of which kills Burroway. Yago meets with the Troika (the name Billy gave Amelia's group) and makes a deal with them to abandon Billy on Earth and leave on Mother with him. He then sends his last Blue Meanie to spy on Jobs. The next morning, Jobs finds his newly planted tomato seed sprouting. As all the Remnants and Billy all gather around it, Yago takes off on Mother with the Troika, and unintentionally, Tate. The Remnants are left on the barren Earth along with four Blue Meanies and a pair of Riders. And unbeknownst to anyone, a girl named Echo has observed everything from an unnoticed view deck.
- Dream Storm: Having been abandoned on Earth by Yago and the Troika, Anamull starts a fight with the Blue Meanies and Riders, killing two of the Meanies and prompting the other aliens to retreat. Billy, now disconnected from Mother, falls into a coma. Echo is now formally introduced as being an Alpha, part of a human colony who survived the Rock, who strongly believe in genetic perfection and decided to allow the Remnants to die. Another group, known as the Marauders, live out in the wild and their leader, Hawk, kills the Alpha leader, Woody, and forcefully takes more than the Marauders' fair share of food. Meanwhile, Jobs and Mo'Steel take the suits from the dead Blue Meanies to explore the area. While they're away, D-Caf accidentally eats Anamull when he loses control of the worms in his body. Jobs and Mo'Steel also get caught in a violent storm that makes them see things that can't possibly be real; Jobs sees San Francisco and Mo'Steel sees his grandmother making bread. They return to the others and Edward reports that he'd seen some people nearby, who are some of the Marauders. Edward leads the Remnants to where he spotted them, and they stumble into the Alphas' home where Hawk and some of the Marauders attack them. Mo'Steel kills Hawk with a Rider boomerang he and the other Remnants are taken to separate rooms. Mo'Steel wakes up and a Marauder woman named Aga says he is the new leader of the Marauders. When Mo'Steel asks to see the others, he finds that Billy is missing from the group.
- Aftermath: Mo'Steel must now prove himself worthy of being leader of the Marauders by killing a Beast. He, along with the Remnants and Marauders, depart from the Alpha colony. Hawk's brother, Newton, is angry that Mo'Steel become leader as he had intended to become leader himself; he then plots the best ways to usurp Mo'Steel. During the journey, Mo'Steel learns that some of the Marauders are mutated humans rejected by the Alphas. Some of them, like Badger and Cocker, are decent people, and Olga befriends Aga. The Marauders also have a shaman among them named Sanchez, to whom Violet is attracted to. If any person created by the Alphas had any sort of disability, they were rejected and sent to live with the Marauders. They soon arrive in the "Twilight Zone" of Earth and the Marauders warn the Remnants of the Slizzers, which turn out to be mutated cockroaches, one of which steals and devours the child Tackie. Newton makes several attempts to take revenge on Mo'Steel. First he has Rattler attack Olga, but is killed by Mo'Steel. 2Face also sees the Marauders passing around a bag full of pellets and warns the others not to eat them. But when Mo'Steel refuses to marry Grost, Newton has Balder attempt to poison D-Caf, but Aga helps him recover. They now arrive at the lair of the Beasts, where Mo'Steel learns are mutated rats. Mo'Steel kills the leader as instructed and Newton attempts to kill him but is foiled by Edward. No sooner does Mo'Steel berate Newton, then they're all attacked by Savagers, a group of Marauders who turned against their fellows, and have allied themselves with the two Riders.
- Survival: While the rest of the Remnants are trapped on Earth, Tate is trapped on Mother with Yago and the Troika. After gathering all the Blue Meanies and Riders for the Troika to devour, Yago attempts to feed Tate to the Troika. But Tate's new mutation, the Mouth, overcomes her and she eats Yago, whose consciousness is still alive in Tate's mind. Tate then falls asleep and sees a vision of the earth green again and even saw someone she knew to be Jobs's daughter. She then wakes up and finds one of the chairs interfaced with Mother and sits in it. She learns that Mother is feeling terrible pain because Billy is no longer with her and displays feelings to Tate by taking memories out of Tate's own mind. The Troika now emerge from cocoons and Amelia deliberately gets eaten by Tate while Duncan plants a virus into Mother, reducing her to a simple computer called Daughter. Tate also eats Charlie and has dreams of Billy merging with Mother on Earth people living on a green Earth. She along with Yago, Amelia and Charlie take control of Daughter and use her to launch Duncan into the vacuum of space. Charlie later takes over Tate's body but is killed when Tate, Yago and Amelia drive him insane and causes him to fade away. Tate, Yago and Amelia spend sixty years of peace traveling the stars trying to find new forms of life. When Yago requests to Tate that they return to Earth, Tate refuses, unwilling to return to what's left of Earth. Tate wakes up the next day and learns from Amelia that Yago has died of old age. Feeling responsible for Yago, Tate and Amelia come up with a plan to undo the damage of the Rock. Traveling through time and space Tate orders a rehabilitated Mother to crash into Asia where the Remnants originally landed, killing her and Amelia on impact.
- Begin Again: The Remnants and Marauders emerge victorious against the Savagers, killing the two Riders and sustaining no casualties of their own. After the battle, Sanchez informs them that he can hear the Source calling to them. Mo'Steel sends Cocker to the Alpha colony but they refuse to come. Echo, who had volunteered some of DNA to make a new human is found out to be blind, and so the Alphas imprison Echo and her baby intending to leave them to die. Lyric, Mattock and Echo's mentor, Westie help Echo and her baby escape but Westie chooses to stay in the colony and instructs the others to leave her. They meet Cocker who takes them to the source with the others. The source is none other than Mother. Jobs, Mo'Steel, Violet, 2Face, Mattock, Newton and Sanchez enter Mother and find Tate's skeleton and a recording she took before crashing on Earth telling the Remnants that all they need is love and to listen to Billy, who has merged with Mother. Sanchez then has a vision of a green Earth. They return from Mother and inform the others. Newton doesn't believe that this green world is possible and intends to keep it from coming to pass. Sanchez stays inside Mother and learns from Billy that three elements are needed for a ritual to make Earth green, Mother, the Five, who were the other missing five besides the Troika, and Echo's child, who Jobs had named Lumina. Newton attempts to steal Lumina, but is foiled by the Remnants, prompting him to flee. 2Face, convinced that Billy is setting them up to fail attempts to kill Billy, resulting with Billy killing her but giving her a vision of her mother to die peacefully. Echo then willingly agrees to risk her baby's life and gives her to Billy. In the epilogue, the ritual has succeeded but 2Face's attack made Billy unable to survive the regreening. Jobs has married Echo and have named their next daughter after Tate, Mo'steel has married Noyze, who have one child and another on the way, Mattock and Lyric have married and Violet marries Sanchez. They have searched for the Alphas with no luck and there's no sign of Newton. At last, the survivors have peace.

== Notes ==
- Although there are numerous references to "The Ancient Enemy", it is never specified what The Ancient Enemy is: a being, a place, or something else. Several points of evidence (including Te identifying him as such) point to Billy as being The Ancient Enemy. However, at one point the Troika chant "We are The Ancient Enemy". Furthermore, it is not known who or what The Ancient Enemy is the enemy of.
- The sources of the various mutations are not known. Most are described as being a result of exposure to radiation; however, even some of the characters note that this is not an adequate explanation: some are subtle, while some are extreme (compare the Troika to a lesser mutation like Edward's chameleon-like power to change the color of his skin). Some only become apparent after a time: Tate's mutation "The Mouth" is only discovered over halfway through the series. Certain characters seem to have unusual traits unrelated to the others. Examples include Kubrick, whose see-through skin is caused by Mother, and Billy, whose strange abilities (also unexplained) existed before the main events of the stories.
- The bodies of all the corpses of the Mayflower passengers vanish without explanation. Eight "Missings" are unaccounted for. Three become the Troika, and the others, called "The Missing Five" are later revealed to be, somehow, alive within Billy.
- Although the Moon, or any of the three parts it breaks into never impact Earth (Jobs and Mo watch the devastation unfold from orbit after manually releasing the Mayflower's solar sails), the Earth that the Remnants return to has the Moon embedded in its side.
- The book series has a few references to The Beatles, with one book being called Nowhere Land, a reference to The Beatles' song "Nowhere Man", and the villains of The Beatles film Yellow Submarine are called Blue Meanies.
- There is an explicit reference to the Grateful Dead in the series. In the book Begin Again, after Mo'Steel hears Tate's audio log, he remarks to Jobs, "What a long strange trip it's been," which is a famous line from the Dead's song "Truckin'".
- In the summary for Nowhere Land, the Remnants are described finding a power node, a green cone buzzing with electricity, when in fact this does not happen in the book.
- Although it is hinted at in No Place Like Home, the origin of the fire that burned 2Face is never revealed.
- In Lost and Found, both Rodger Dodger and D-Caf tell of having strange nightmares while being dead, but neither of their nightmares are ever revealed.
- In The Mayflower Project, it is described that those who enter the hibernation bays must swallow the end of a long tube that goes down their throat and put a plastic mask over their faces in order for the hibernation technology to function. These apparatuses are not mentioned, however, when the survivors are waking up in Destination Unknown.

== See also ==
- Simulated reality
