= Santiago Colomo Martínez =

Spanish animator and visual effects artist

- Born: Navalcarnero, Spain
- Occupation(s): Animator, visual effects artist

Santiago Colomo Martínez is a Spanish animator and visual effects artist. He was nominated for an Academy Award in the category Best Visual Effects for the film The One and Only Ivan.

== Selected filmography ==
- The One and Only Ivan (2020; co-nominated with Nick Davis, Greg Fisher and Ben Jones)
