= Ivan (gorilla) =

Gorilla (1962–2012)

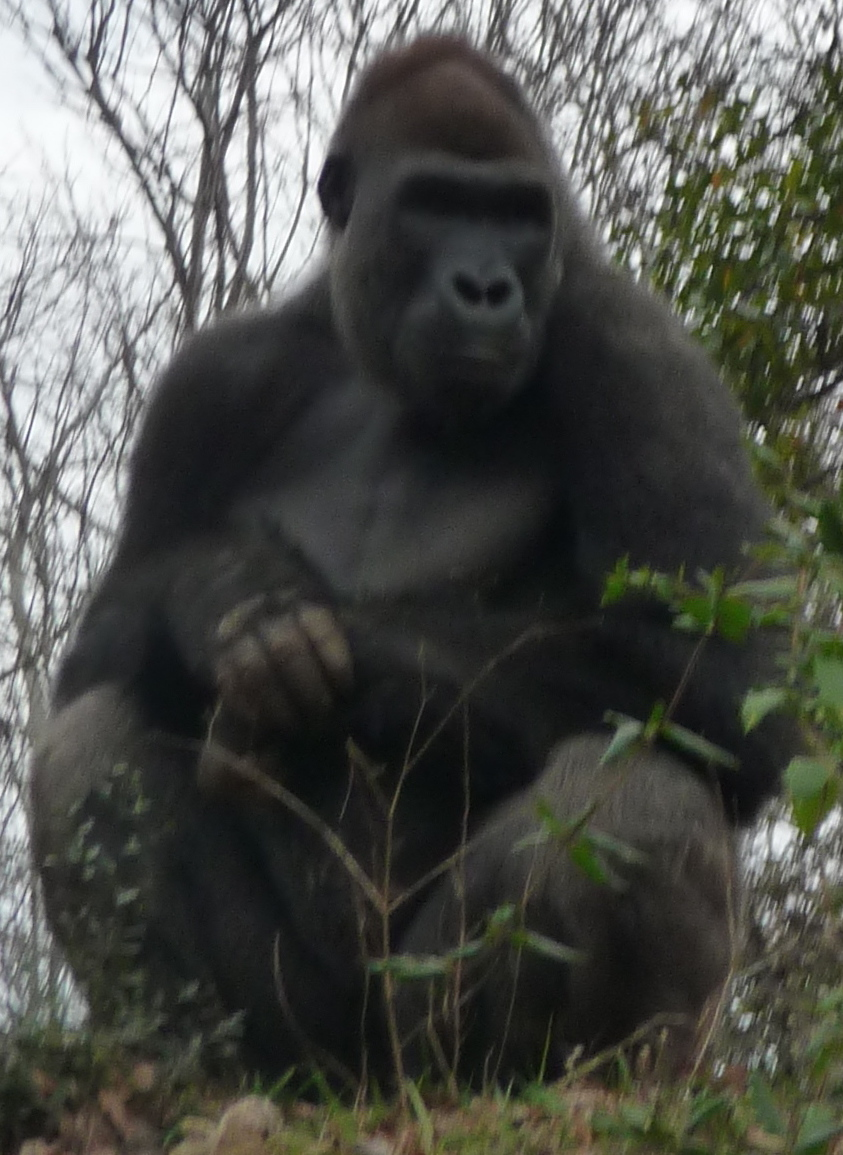
- Ivan in 2009
- Species: Western lowland gorilla
- Sex: Male
- Born: 1962; Democratic Republic of Congo
- Died: August 21, 2012 (aged 49–50); Atlanta, Georgia, U.S.
- ivanthegorilla.org

Ivan (1962 – August 21, 2012) was a western lowland gorilla born in 1962 in what is now the Democratic Republic of the Congo. He was captured from the wild as a baby and brought to live with humans. For the first few years of his life he lived with his owners, but he soon grew too big for a human house and they moved him to a 14' x 14' concrete enclosure on display to the public at the B&I shopping center in Tacoma, Washington, where he spent the next 27 years of his life.

After local animal welfare organizations successfully campaigned for his release to a facility that could care for Ivan properly, in 1994, he was placed at Woodland Park Zoo in Seattle. Shortly after this, he was placed on permanent loan to Zoo Atlanta in Atlanta, Georgia. He spent his remaining years at Zoo Atlanta and died from complications during a medical procedure in August 2012.

Ivan's story was fictionalized in the 2012 book The One and Only Ivan by Katherine Applegate, which was adapted into a 2020 film of the same name.

== Animal welfare controversy ==
In 1987, the animal rights group Progressive Animal Welfare Society (PAWS), upset at the conditions in which Ivan lived, began a campaign on his behalf. PAWS encouraged the community of Tacoma and other nearby cities to protest and to boycott the B&I shopping center. The community collected signatures, raised and donated money to PAWS, took out newspaper ads, and raised $30,000 to buy Ivan from the B&I shopping center to be re-homed within Seattle's Woodland Park Zoo.

In 1991, National Geographic Explorer aired a documentary entitled The Urban Gorilla. The film featured Ivan in his small enclosure and another gorilla, Willie B., who had previously been living in similar circumstances but had since been released in a large zoo habitat and was re-learning naturalistic gorilla behavior. The contrast between the two gorillas was so pronounced that Ivan became a national animal welfare concern. His story was covered in several publications, including People and The New Yorker.

In 1994, due largely to the successful campaign work by PAWS and the national public outcry, the B&I relinquished their rights to Ivan. The gorilla was gifted to Woodland Park Zoo, who registered him in the Species Survival Plan for gorillas.

== Life at Zoo Atlanta ==
Later in 1994, Ivan was placed on permanent loan to Zoo Atlanta. Though he was in a new, more appropriate habitat, he struggled with elements of his life as an outdoor gorilla. Ivan had not been outside his enclosure at the B&I for over 27 years, and until his transfer to Atlanta, had never socialized with other gorillas.

At first he would not interact with the other gorillas at the zoo and preferred the company of humans. Given time and training, he was able to readjust and accept his role as silverback in the troop. Ivan was rarely observed breeding with the female gorillas in his troop, and he did not sire offspring.

== Death and legacy ==
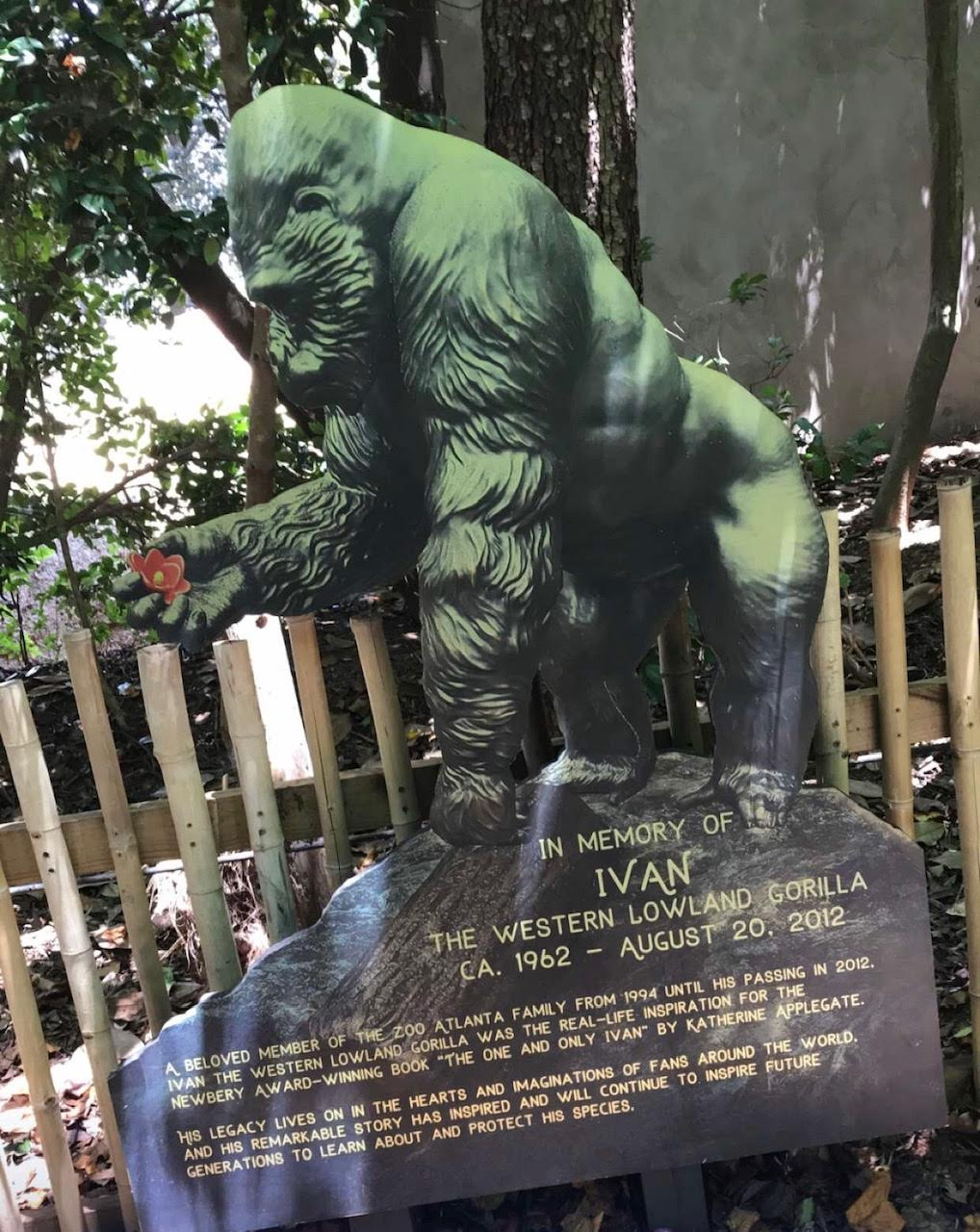
A placard at the Point Defiance Zoo in memory of Ivan

On Tuesday, August 21, 2012, 50-year-old Ivan died while anesthetized during a medical exam. His health had been in decline and the necropsy revealed a large tumor in his chest. Ivan was one of the oldest gorillas in captivity when he died.

Zoo Atlanta honored the request made by Ivan's original owners to have his remains cremated and returned to Tacoma, Washington. People sent birthday and holiday cards to Ivan throughout his life at Zoo Atlanta, and also sent flowers and condolence cards after his death.

A 600-pound (270 kg) bronze statue of Ivan was unveiled outside the Point Defiance Zoo's main entrance on October 26, 2016.

American children’s author K. A. Applegate wrote the children’s book titled The One and Only Ivan, which was inspired by the life of Ivan. It is largely a work of fiction, though the outline of the plot is very similar to Ivan's life events. In 2013, the novel was the recipient of the Newbery Medal.

On April 9, 2014, it was announced that Disney was set to adapt the book with Allison Shearmur producing. Thea Sharrock directed, with a script from Mike White. The film The One and Only Ivan was released on the streaming service Disney+ on August 21, 2020, the eighth anniversary of Ivan's death.

== See also ==
- List of individual apes
- The One and Only Ivan
- The One and Only Ivan (film)
