= Everworld =

Fantasy novel series by K. A. Applegate

The cover of the first book in the series, Search for Senna.

Everworld is a fantasy novel series co-authored by Katherine Applegate and her husband Michael Grant, writing together under the name K. A. Applegate, and published by Scholastic between 1999 and 2001. It consists of twelve books and a companion music CD titled The Everworld Experience.

== The Plot ==
The series features five protagonists: David, April, Christopher, Senna and Jalil. When Senna is kidnapped by the wolf Fenrir, the remaining protagonists in an attempt to save her are catapulted into an alternative fantasy world, called Everworld. The protagonists live in both worlds, Everworld and the normal world. Every time they fall asleep, they can see what they are doing in the normal world; where they continue to lead their lives as usual. In Everworld, however; often accompanied by the god Loki, they will have to face powerful enemies and visit places that they thought existed only in fairy tales and myths, trying to survive, to prevent evil creatures from opening a passage to the normal world and to understand the why and how of their comings and goings.

== Main characters ==
- David Levin: The self-appointed leader of the protagonists. David takes on all the burdens of the group, and has been troubled by his past in which he was cowardly; he must prove himself to be a man. Before being sucked into Everworld, he was involved in a romantic relationship with Senna Wales. As such, he is most susceptible to the influence of Senna's powers. He shows his courage and bravery before Zeus, other gods, and Vikings. David fights with the Sword of Galahad, after witnessing Sir Galahad's death. At the end of the series, he opts to stay in Everworld to help protect it, as well as to escape his mother's smoking and depression problems. David narrates #1: Search for Senna, #5: Discover the Destroyer, and #10: Understand the Unknown.
- Christopher Hitchcock: The reluctant clown of the group, Christopher often makes jokes specifically targeted towards the other members of the group (April (sexism), Jalil (racism), and David (antisemitism)). He does this to keep the others at a distance, so they won't get to know him. Christopher is, in his own words, on the road to becoming an alcoholic like his parents. However, he can be a jerk one minute, and a kind, caring person the next. Christopher gave up the offer to become an immortal because he failed to save the life of Ganymede, Zeus' male lover; blaming his failure on latent homophobia causes Christopher to fall into an alcoholic depression and is the turning point for his character. Christopher also decreases in his prejudice jokes when Keith, who is part of a group of racists and anti-Semitics that plan to overthrow the government, tries to recruit him. At the end of the series, he opts to stay in Everworld to avoid his parents' alcoholic nature, escape his younger brother's ridicule and abuse, and stay off the road to a possible alcoholic future. Christopher narrates #2: Land of Loss, #6: Fear the Fantastic, and #11: Mystify the Magician.
- April O'Brien: The heroine of the group, April is Senna's half-sister; their personalities, however, are directly opposite, and the two hate each other with a passion. April is a devout Catholic, somewhat feminist, and very beautiful with red hair and green eyes. She is in the drama club at her real world school, and she is often singing songs from Rent. She is also said to be very popular at the main characters' high school. April carries her own burdens in the group, and is often the voice of reason next to Jalil. She is a vegetarian. She has the most reason to want to return to the Old World at the end of the series, due to how much she could possibly leave behind. Ultimately, however, she opts to remain in Everworld due to her unbearable guilt and inability to face her father over her murder of Senna, knowing that it would never be acceptable in their home world, no matter how necessary it had been in Everworld. April narrates #3: Enter the Enchanted, #7: Gateway to the Gods, and #12: Entertain the End.
- Jalil Sherman: The scientist and sole African-American of the group, he wants to find the "software" on which Everworld runs and control it. In the real world, Jalil is obsessive-compulsive, but in Everworld, he is unaffected. His disorder is a secret to the rest of the group for a majority of the series. Senna, however, knows of his condition and was able to temporarily cure it while the two were in the Old World, on the condition he would swear to serve her. He refused. Jalil always tries hard to search for a logical explanation for the many illogical phenomena in Everworld. He and April often butt heads when it comes to religion since he's an atheist and naturalist, but the two often fall on the same side in arguments within the group. At the end of the series, he opts to stay in Everworld rather than return home to the Old World because he does not have to live with his disorder. His name ironically means "godlike." Jalil narrates #4: Realm of the Reaper and #8: Brave the Betrayal.
- Senna Wales: The witch who intertwines all the characters. Senna is David's girlfriend, Christopher's ex-girlfriend, and April's half-sister (they have the same father and different mothers) and has blond hair and gray eyes. Senna is the only main character with real magical power, and at times, uses the others for her own ends, whether through emotional manipulation or magic. Her magical power is much stronger in Everworld than in the Old World. Her name was originally Senda (meaning "gateway" in Spanish), but after her mother left her she began to refer to herself based on her father's mispronunciation. Senna sometimes uses her powers on others for her own benefit, whether for protection or distraction, though usually in an effort to further her own plans. Senna's ultimate goal is to overthrow the powers of Everworld and rule over it for her own. She is ultimately foiled in her plan, however, when she is killed by April in the penultimate book. Senna only narrates #9: Inside the Illusion.

== Recurring characters ==
- Loki: The Norse god of destruction who brought David, Senna, Christopher, Jalil, and April into Everworld. Loki wants to use Senna as a gateway to the Old World to escape Ka Anor. Loki escaped from his prison when he was brought to Everworld centuries ago and at some point in the recent past overthrew and imprisoned Odin. He is also the father of Hel, Fenrir, and the Midgard Serpent.
- Ka Anor: The god-eating deity of the Hetwans who wants to devour all the gods in Everworld before they escape to the Old World. It also is trying to capture Senna, most likely to prevent the other gods from using her to escape.
- Thorolf: A Viking, in whose farm David, Christopher, Jalil, and April spend the night in Everworld #1: Search for Senna. Died and "ascended" to Valhalla in Everworld #8: Brave The Betrayal.
- Olaf Ironfoot: A Viking king with an iron foot, Olaf fought alongside David, Christopher, and Jalil against the Aztecs. He engaged Huitzilopoctli in personal combat wielding Mjolnir, before being sliced in half by the god. He is of African descent, likely due to the Vikings' tendency to intermarry with other peoples.
- Sven Swordeater: A young Viking who was stabbed through the cheeks, causing a speech impediment. Sven was also killed by Huitzilopoctli.
- Monsieur Jean-Claude LeMieux: A Frenchman who is brought to Everworld thanks to a nuclear explosion. He lives in and is the mayor of the Greek version of Atlantis.
- Etain: An Irish woman, the half-elf daughter of the Queen of the Elves, whom Christopher falls in love with. Etain seems to have feelings for him too; however, the series ends with the implication that she probably married the dwarf-king Baldwin in exchange for his assistance in the war to save Everworld.
- Keith: A violent and suicidal Neo-Nazi who worked with Christopher at an independent copy store for a short amount of time.
- Anica: A Wiccan who fled the Old World when Loki and other forces desiring a gateway began to search for her, taking refuge with the Egyption Pantheon of Everworld. Before leaving she left her illegitimate daughter with the girl's father and his family, the O'Briens. Anica fears Senna's wrath above all else, but at the same time, seeks her forgiveness. She is last seen pleading for it, but it is unknown as to whether or not she receives it from Senna.
- Merlin: The famous wizard who, along with Ka Anor and Loki, is trying to capture Senna, though in his case it is merely to keep anyone from using her, and likely to prevent her takeover of Everworld. Senna fears him the most, and refers to him as the most powerful being in Everworld, because while he lacks the power of the average god, his cleverness and imagination give him an edge. His ultimate goal is to bring all the deities and people of Everworld together to stop Ka Anor, a goal that is finally coming to fruition by the end of the series.

== People ==
=== Old-Worlders ===
The Old-Worlders are people who do not live in Everworld and who live in the old world (Earth).

=== Gods ===
Many gods were in the Everworld series. Nearly all the gods shared similar characteristics such as shape shifting, physical perfection, superhuman strength and immortality. They could only be killed by the weapon of another god such as Thor's hammer Mjolnir or through severe injury. Even then, there is a chance they could heal. Real world weapons however do seem to harm gods. When the Sennites arrived with automatic weapons, they apparently killed Fenrir. Many of the gods had special powers related to their field and some were radically more powerful than others. Nearly all of them were portrayed as being cold and cruel in their attitude toward humans if not outright insane due to their power and long lives and would rather carry on their petty squabbles from ancient times. Most are slow to change or act unless they feel immediately threatened allowing the threat of the Hetwan to grow. The gods in Everworld included:

- Greek
  - Zeus
  - Athena
  - Apollo
  - Artemis
  - Ares
  - Dionysus
  - Heracles
  - Hera
  - Hermes (not specifically named, but seen)
  - Aphrodite
  - Eros
  - Ganymede (Eaten by Ka Anor)
  - Poseidon
- Norse
  - Odin
  - Loki
  - Baldur
  - Thor
  - Hel
  - Midgard Serpent
  - Fenrir (Apparently killed by the Sennites)
  - Valkyries
- Egyptian
  - Amun-Ra
  - Sobek
  - Osiris
  - Isis
  - Khnum (not specifically named, but seen)
- Roman
  - Jupiter
  - Neptune
  - Venus
- Aztec
  - Huitzilopoctli
  - Quetzalcoatl
- Celtic
  - Daghda (Eaten by Ka Anor)
  - Brigid
  - Donn
- Yoruba
  - Eshu
- Mesopotamia
  - Ereshkigal
- Persian
  - Ahriman
- Hetwan
  - Ka Anor
- Coo-Hatch
  - Goddess of the Ore
  - God of Fire

This list is not complete

=== Vikings ===
The Vikings are very similar to their real world counterparts, but in many ways are easier to relate to than other groups of people. A mixture of farmers, craftsmen and warriors that glorify battle, but are trustworthy allies. Among the peoples of Everworld they are easy to get along with and motivate into needed action instead of bickering amongst themselves. They are also the most cosmopolitan of Everworld humans, as they readily accept people of other races into their ranks (African, Asian, etc.) They worshiped Loki for an unknown period of time when he overthrew Odin and other major gods such as Thor and Balder disappeared.

=== Aztecs ===
The Aztecs, in their Everworld incarnation, are portrayed as an utterly savage and barbaric society of cannibals. They are first encountered at the end of the first book, Search for Senna. The Aztecs are known by many names in Everworld, including "The Blood-Drinkers," "The Mexica," and "The Heart Eaters." Some groups worship Huitzilopoctli, while others worship Quetzalcoatl.

=== Coo-Hatch ===
The Coo-Hatch are strange creatures from an alien world who abandoned their gods after their God of the Flame and Goddess of the Ore brought them to Everworld against their will. A majority of the Coo-Hatch seem to be disillusioned by their deities and Everworld and want to go back to their realm. They often ally themselves with whomever they believe can achieve this goal. They have large red eyes with blue pupils, two main arms as well as two smaller arms that have more dexterity and are on the sides of their faces. Their mouths are long and tapered. Juvenile Coo-Hatch are small and flighted with needle-like mouths. The juveniles are very fast fliers, covering a space of 20 feet in the length of a human blink.

The Coo-Hatch are also master metal forgers and can create blades sharp enough to cut through any known material; they use this skill to make small, accurate throwing blades and metal tools. In exchange of April's chemistry book, the Coo-Hatch improve Jalil's pocket knife to their quality of metal, giving them a small blade that can cut through anything, the group dubbing it "Excalibur". The Coo-Hatch had no knowledge of guns or explosives prior to the exchange. The Coo-Hatch used the textbook to develop primitive cannons. The Coo-Hatch then aided the Hetwans in almost taking over Mt. Olympus. Later, some of the tribes of the Coo-Hatch team up with the protagonists and develop cannons to use in an assault on the Hetwans (which supposedly takes place after the series end).

Their one true desire is to go back to their forges on their home world, which they cannot do without a gateway like Senna or her mother. Though this plot was not built upon later in the series, Senna's mother was sought out to send them back to their world.

=== Hetwan ===
The Hetwan are large, sentient insectoid aliens that seem to exist as a collective hive rather than as a group of individuals. Male Hetwan consist of two arms, a pair of wings, fly-like eyes, and three constantly moving claws near their mouths. The claws are used to grasp a tube that is then used to project the Hetwan's acidic saliva. They continue moving at a slower pace after death. Female Hetwan are flying translucent sacks of organs. They travel in packs, where, upon encountering male Hetwan, they are savagely torn apart, thus birthing perhaps a dozen Hetwan on the waist of the male.

The Hetwan worship Ka Anor, the dread god of terror, and serve his will to devour all the gods in Everworld. Though aliens, the Hetwan have no high-tech weaponry. They do, however, wield devices similar to long straws (nicknamed "Super-Soakers" by the main characters), out of which they shoot a burning, venomous acid. The Hetwan themselves seem to feel no fear of death or anything. As repeatedly stated by them they exist merely to serve Ka Anor and are absolutely loyal to him.

The Hetwan live in a great city that resembles a giant needle sticking out of a pit (referred to by Chris as "Junkie Dreamland"), with an assortment of strange creatures from their home world.

The main characters often fight against the Hetwan. Because Ka Anor intends to eventually kill and consume all of Everworld's gods, most of the peoples of Everworld would be considered enemies of the Hetwan, although they generally seek to appease them out of fear of destruction.

Little is known about the Hetwans' life before Everworld, but like all alien species (those not from human mythology), they were brought there from another world (not "our" world) by their particular deity, the dread-god Ka Anor. They then began to conquer everything they came across, while collecting gods for their deity to consume. The Hetwan kingdom in Everworld alternates between perfectly hemispherical hills and gullies, giving a scooped-out appearance. The alien trees make strange musical sounds. The Hetwan capital, where Ka Anor resides, is a massive tower (dubbed "Junkie Dream Mountain" for its needle-like appearance) in the middle of a lava and glass filled crater. The only transportation across this gulf is by means of the "Red Wings", giant insects that can carry passengers.

=== Knights ===
The knights are classic men of chivalry. Self-described as "creatures of myth and legend", their main pastimes seem to be slaying dragons, rescuing young girls, and feasting. Despite witnessing April taking out several trolls, the knights still believe that women should act "womanly"—no fighting, allowing themselves to be looked over and pampered. They are very brave and value honor highly. The knights met in the series were all surviving members of the Knights of the Round Table such as Galahad. While they had not aged since entering Everworld they lack the immortality of many other beings. Merlin is often allied with these beings.

=== Eunuchs ===
The eunuchs in Everworld are male warriors with big, muscular bodies but with high-pitched voices; this is because they were castrated before they reached puberty.

The symbol on their breastplates is a bloody dagger with two red diamonds. They always say "jewels" when referring to testicles. The eunuchs guard the City of Hel (known only as "Her City"), kidnapping men to inhabit it as Hel's personal harem. (Why Hel's harem requires eunuchs is never explained, but perhaps indicates that her powers over or interest in castrated males is reduced or nonexistent.)

=== Fairies ===
The fairies share some characteristics with the wood nymphs. Like nymphs, they are about four feet tall and rather thin. Fairies can move quickly when necessary, though not as quickly as nymphs can. Unlike the fairies commonly portrayed, they do not have wings. Their typical attire is a leather tunic and a tight helmet, and their main weapons are arrows and swords. Different colored tunics signify different jobs within Fairy Land; for example, a fairy wearing a dark blue tunic is part of the fairy version of the IRS and goes around making notes on the various stands within the city, while a fairy in a black tunic is part of the police force.

Fairies in Everworld, also called "leprechauns", are known for their cupidity---Fairy Land, which is very pristine and clean compared to other parts of Everworld, serves as a kind of economic center for the entire world. It has a King and Queen; though it is unclear who has official power, the Queen is portrayed as the brains of the two.

=== Greeks ===
In the books, the Greeks are battling the Hetwan to keep Ka Anor from conquering Mount Olympus. They live in the land surrounding the Everworld equivalent of Mt. Olympus. They worship Zeus along with the other Olympian gods such as, Ares, Hera, and Athena. Among the gods of Everworld, Olympus is implied to be one of the most powerful places due to the large number of gods living there. Athena is one of the few gods who not only acts in a sane manner, but also aides the protagonists in their quest.

=== Egyptians ===
The Egyptians are a reactionary race living along the Nile. Due to centuries of ritual and inbreeding the Egyptian culture became weak. The Amazons, led by Pretty Little Flower used this to their advantage and proceeded to subjugate and loot Egypt. This ended when the crocodile god Sobek freed the capital and killed Pretty Little Flower, becoming Lord of all Egypt. The rest of the Egyptian gods had become living statues due to their long lives and dedication to ritual.

=== Dwarves ===
Dwarves are a mountain dwelling race. Dwarves stand about four feet tall with extremely stocky builds. Most dwarves have long hair and beards. They are generally seen with chainmail and some sort of weapon. While most dwarves seen are men, often women are mistaken for men, due to their masculine appearance. They are skilled in both mining and blacksmithing.

The dwarves are led by King Baldwin, who resides in his capital of Daggermouth. Beneath Daggermouth is a mining complex known as the Five Hills, each of which produce a different kind of metal. They are known to have close relations to the Vikings, as is evidenced by their metalwork in Viking ships, as well as their reverence for Thor and Baldur.

=== Mermaids ===
Mermaids are ruled by Neptune. In the book, there are mermen, as well. The mermen act as guards and are part of Neptune's army. The mermaids swim around topless, and much to Christopher's delight, their hair rarely manages to cover their nudity. They live underwater in the Roman version of Atlantis.

=== Atlanteans ===
A technologically advanced race living under Everworld's ocean. They are led by Jean-Claude LeMieux, who serves as mayor of the city. There is a Roman and a Greek version of the city.

=== Irish ===
In the books, the Irish have embraced technology faster than any other people; in one of their cities, they have electricity and cable cars. This is believed to come to some degree from the telegraph that the main characters brought to Everworld, but also from the goddess Brigid. Their knowledge also may have come from the Druids, who are ordered by colors; the "yellow" druids being those in the study of electricity and technology. The lands of the Irish are protected by the Fiannans, a special order of knights. They are ruled by a number of kings who are ruled by a high king. Merlin is closely allied with them and they attribute his wisdom to maintaining peace in their land for over two hundred years.

=== Sennites ===
The Sennites are a group of white supremacists Senna brought over from the Old World. With modern weapons, they are a force to be reckoned with. At the beginning of the final book, Entertain the End, with Senna dead, David and the others wonder if the Sennites might forge an alliance with Ka Anor and the Hetwan. This forces the four to make a deal with the gods in order to stem the threat.

== List of books ==
- Everworld #1: Search for Senna
- Everworld #2: Land of Loss
- Everworld #3: Enter the Enchanted
- Everworld #4: Realm of the Reaper
- Everworld #5: Discover the Destroyer
- Everworld #6: Fear the Fantastic
- Everworld #7: Gateway to the Gods
- Everworld #8: Brave the Betrayal
- Everworld #9: Inside the Illusion
- Everworld #10: Understand the Unknown
- Everworld #11: Mystify the Magician
- Everworld #12: Entertain the End

== See also ==
- Michael Grant
- David B. Mattingly
