= Slimeballs =

Children's book series

- Author: Catherine Clark (as U. B. Gross)
- Country: United States
- Language: English
- Genre: Parody; Horror
- Published: 1995
- Media type: Print (hardcover and paperback)

Slimeballs is a short-lived middle-grade series of books by U. B. Gross, the pseudonym of Catherine Clark. They are generally humorous, in a similar vein to Grossology, Barf-O-Rama, and the Gooflumps parodies.

== Book list ==
- Fun Gus and Polly Pus

When Gus gets athlete's foot, he bites off his fingernails to distract himself from itching. Soon green fungus and white puffballs are exploding all around him. At the doctor's office, he meets Polly, who is covered in green goo from scratching her pus-filled poison ivy.

- Fun Gus Slimes the Bus

Nurse Gillette crashed and burned as school nurse, but now she is back as the gas-guzzling, bug juice slurping school bus driver. Gillette hijacks Gus's class for a joyride to Crudd Caverns, where the fungus named Rot rules.

- The Slithers Buy a Boa

Slithers family is facing with a problem when rodents are having lunch on food scraps in their filthy den. They realize they need an exterminator, which comes in the form of Bucky, a boa constrictor with a big appetite, but digesting mouse-sized meals slows the snake down, so for a while, Bucky becomes a real "couch potato" in his terrarium.
