= Barf-O-Rama =

Children's book series

Barf-O-Rama is a series of children's novellas by Pat Pollari, the pseudonym of children's author Katherine Applegate. The stories are humorous, with a strong emphasis on toilet humor and gross-out themes. The humor contained in the series is similar to that of Sylvia Branzei's Grossology series or the Slimeballs trilogy, by U.B. Gross. Because of the limited availability of many of the books in the series and their relative obscurity, most of them are out of print and difficult to obtain.

== Book list ==
1. The Great Puke-Off
2. The Legend of Big Fart
3. Mucus Mansion
4. Garbage Time
5. Dog Doo Afternoon
6. To Wee or Not to Wee
7. Scab Pie
8. Party Pooper
9. Pig Breath
10. My Runny Valenslime
11. The Splat in the Hat
12. Jurassic Fart
13. Shoe Chew
14. Forest Dump
15. Hambooger and French Flies
16. Fungus Among Us
17. Spoiled Rotten

== Sources ==
- The Great Puke-Off on MetroActive
