= Girl Talk (books) =

Series of books by L.E. Blair

- See list of books
- Author: L.E. Blair (Katherine Applegate and others)
- Country: United States
- Language: English
- Genre: Young Adult
- Publisher: Western Pub Co
- Published: 1990-1992
- Media type: Print (Paperback)

Girl Talk is a series of books for teenage girls by Katherine Applegate and other writers, writing under the pseudonym L.E. Blair, telling school adventures of four American teenagers in junior high school: Sabrina, Allison, Randy, and Katie. The series takes place in the fictional small town of Acorn Falls, Minnesota. The books were published by Golden Books.

The series, consisting of 45 books, was published in the 1990s. There were spin off products, like board games, and special edition books about fun things to do when bored, and a book filled with advice from Allison. Each book featured an introduction to each girl on the first page, a phone conversation between two or more girls, a poll on the readers opinions about the books, and the earlier ones featured all the books with a quick summary. Later books featured a list of the books with no summaries.

The books were also accompanied by tabletop games and other merchandise. The Oxford English Dictionary credits the works of L.E. Blair with having the earliest recorded instance of the term "Captain Obvious".

== Characters ==
Rowena "Randy" Zak is a new student from New York City with dark brown eyes and spiked black hair; she has a punk, wild style. She moved to Acorn Falls with her divorced mother, Olivia, an artist, who grew up there. She is an only child. Randy is very creative and is also a musician and loves to play the guitar and the drums.

Allison Cloud is a native American Indian with long black hair, who does well in school. She lives with her parents, grandmother, seven-year-old brother, Charlie, and baby sister, Barrett. Her favorite subject in school is English, and Mrs. Staats is her favorite teacher. She loves to read. Her family also has two gray tabby cats. She may also have a crush on Billy Dixon.

Sabrina "Sabs" Wells has curly red hair, likes to dress preppy and casual, and loves fashion and magazines. Her ultimate goal is to become an actress in Hollywood. She is the youngest of five, and the only girl. She lives with her parents and her brothers Luke (who is in high school), Mark (who is in eighth grade), and Sam (her twin, who is four minutes older than she is and teases her about it). Her oldest brother, Matthew, is away at college. Her family also has a cocker spaniel named Cinnamon, and Sabs often claims to be on a diet.

Katherine "Katie" Campbell has straight honey-blond hair and color-coordinated clothes, excels in school, figure skates and plays ice hockey. She has a sixteen-year-old sister named Emily, whom she calls "Princess Emily." Her father, who played semi-pro hockey, died when she was ten years old. Her mother marries a French Canadian man partway through the series, and she gains a stepbrother named Michael, who is her age, and whom Sabrina likes. Katie likes Scottie Silver. Katie thinks everyone expects her to be perfect, and to be like her sister.

Stacy Hansen is the spoiled daughter of the school principal, and Sabrina's rival. Stacy has long blond hair. Her best friends are Eva, Laurel, and B.Z. (short for Bethany Zoe), who also do not get along with Sabrina and her friends, but in Peer Pressure, Laurel and Katie form a friendship, which was never mentioned again in any other books. This is similar to Allison's relationship with a girl in her swimming class, who was also not mentioned again.

Laurel "Ice Queen" Spencer is Stacy's best friend and in book nine she has a brief friendship with Katie. She has long brown hair and brown eyes. She has an older sister, Lara who is "perfect" Lara may be the reason Laurel is so frosty.

While the girls were all friends, it seems that they each had one best friend. Katie had Sabrina, and Randy had Allison.

== List of books ==
(complete)

1. Welcome To Junior High - The three girls meet Randy and they slowly become best friends as they experience their first few weeks in junior high.
2. Face-Off! - Katie tries out for the boys' hockey team and deals with discrimination because she is a girl.
3. The New You - Alison wins a modeling contest.
4. Rebel, Rebel - Randy deals with her homesickness over her move from New York to Acorn Falls when a friend from New York visits.
5. It's All in the Stars - Sabrina's brother plays a trick on her when she becomes obsessed with horoscopes.
6. The Ghost of Eagle Mountain - The girls go camping on a ski hill rumored to be haunted by a ghost.
7. Odd Couple - When a health class project pairs Randy up with a boy she believes is a goody-two shoes, she realizes they may have something in common.
8. Stealing The Show - Sabrina tries out for the school play, hoping to star in Grease as Sandy, but is chosen for Frenchie instead.
9. Peer Pressure - Katie is chosen for a school skating team, along with Stacy and her friend Laurel. Katie has to deal with her friends' criticism when she befriends Laurel.
10. Falling in Like - Alison tutors a rather sullen student who is bright, yet seems to be struggling in school.
11. Mixed Feelings - Sabrina and Katie both have crushes on a Canadian boy on Katie's hockey team. He later becomes Katie's stepbrother.
12. Drummer Girl - Randy joins a band to compete in a battle of the bands contest and deals with sexism when the male lead singer doesn't like his new drummer.
13. The Winning Team - Sabrina runs for class president.
14. Earth Alert! - Alison is chosen as chairwoman of the Earth Alert fair, but Stacy tries to ruin it.
15. On The Air - Randy works at a radio station, and influences students to try new things, such as skateboarding.
16. Here Comes The Bride - Katie's mother gets married.
17. Star Quality - Auditions are held in the girls' hometown for Sabrina's favorite game show.
18. Keeping The Beat - Randy's band is chosen to play at Stacy's party.
19. Family Affair - Katie adjusts to her new family.
20. Rockin' Class Trip - the girls find out they will be staying in the same hotel as their favorite rock musician.
21. Baby Talk - Alison's mother has a baby.
22. Problem Dad - Randy's father visits but seems more concerned about a commercial he is filming.
23. House Party - While Katie's parents are out of town, her stepbrother convinces her to have a party.
24. Cousins - Sabrina is excited to meet her cousin who lives in France until she finds out she's overweight and not the elegant model she expected.
25. Horse Fever - Randy struggles to overcome her fear of horses due to an early childhood accident.
26. Beauty Queens - To help promote a recycling program at school Allison and Sabrina enter themselves in a beauty pageant.
27. Perfect Match - The girls create a dating computer program in class and they are all matched up with different classmates, including the teacher.
28. Center Stage - Sabrina is chosen to direct the school play, The Wizard of Oz, and she wants to act in it and work on scenery. She quickly realizes she cannot do it all.
29. Family Rules - Randy's mother, who is usually very lenient and progressive, starts making rules Randy hates, after reading a book about raising teens and worrying about city-raised Randy being out late in tiny, conservative Acorn Falls with its much darker, isolated streets. When Randy's friend visits, he appears to agree with Randy's mother, until she tells his parents about the book.
30. The Bookshop Mystery - The girls solve a mystery.
31. It's a Scream! - Sabrina is convinced the new science teacher is trying to take control of all the students minds.
32. Katie's Close Call - Katie has to have her appendix out.
33. Randy and the Perfect Boy - An exchange student stays with Randy, and she develops a crush on him.
34. Allison, Shape Up! - Allison joins a swimming team after failing the school's athletic challenge.
35. Katie and Sabrina's Big Competition - Katie enters herself and Sabrina in an athletic competition, but finds Sabrina is not all that interested.
36. Sabrina and the Calf-Raising Disaster - Sabrina enters herself into a 4-H fair.
37. Randy's Big Dream - Randy starts a radio station because she never hears the music she wants to on the radio, but finds out how hard it is to run a radio station.
38. Allison to the Rescue - Alison volunteers at an animal shelter, and tries to get the pets adopted to good families.
39. Katie and the Impossible Cousins - Katie's rich cousins visit the family.
40. Sabrina Wins Big! - Sabrina wins a contest.
41. Randy and the Great Canoe Race - Randy enters a canoe race after a group of boys upset her with sexist remarks.
42. Allison's Baby-Sitting Adventure - Allison baby-sits for a child who is sick with a terminal illness.
43. Katie's Beverly Hills Friend - Katie's friend visits
44. Randy's Big Chance - Randy enters a competition with her horse.
45. Sabrina and Too Many Boys! - Sabrina sets up dates with two boys.
