= Katherine Applegate =

American fiction writer (born 1956)

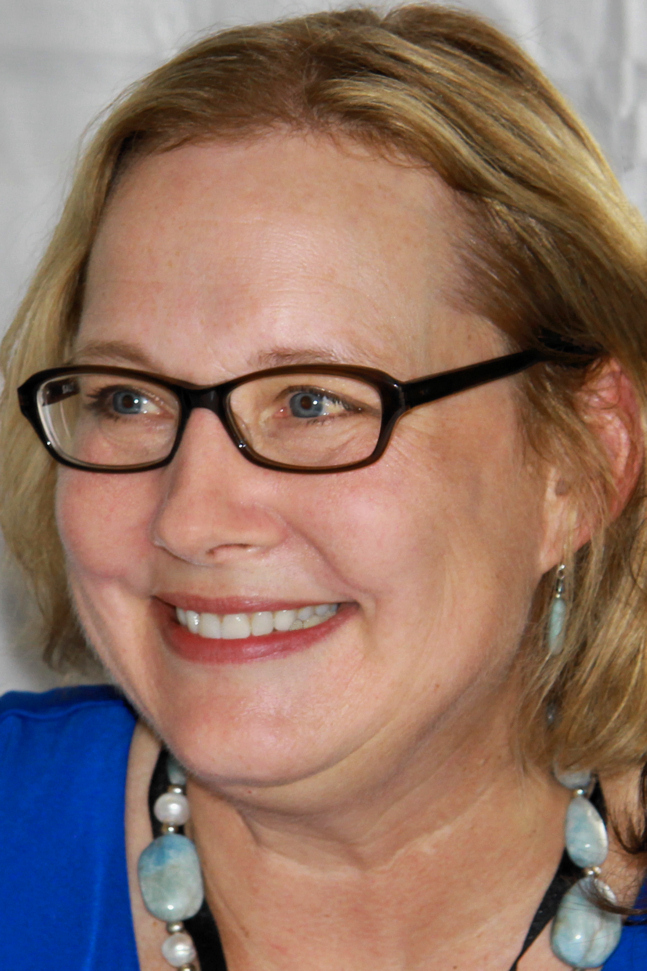
- Applegate at the 2013 Texas Book Festival
- Born: October 9, 1956 (age 70); Ann Arbor, Michigan, U.S.
- Occupation: Writer
- Spouse: Michael Grant
- Children: 2
- Writing career
- Period: 1991–2012, 2019–present
- Genres: Children's fantasy, science fiction, adventure novels
- Notable works: The One and Only Ivan, Animorphs
- Notable awards: Newbery Medal; 2013

Katherine Alice Applegate (born October 9, 1956), sometimes publishing as K. A. Applegate, is an American young adult and children's fiction writer, best known as the author of the Animorphs, Remnants, and Everworld book series. She won the 2013 Newbery Medal for her 2012 children's novel The One and Only Ivan. Applegate's most popular books are science fiction, fantasy, and adventure novels. She won the Publishers Weekly Best New Children's Book Series Award in 1997. Her book Home of the Brave has won several awards.

== Early life ==
Applegate was born on October 9, 1956, in Ann Arbor, Michigan. She studied at the University of Texas at Austin. She has lived in Texas, Florida, California, Illinois, and North Carolina. After living in Pelago, Italy for a year, she moved back to Irvine, California.

== Career ==
Applegate got her start as a ghostwriter for Sweet Valley Twins. She wrote the book series Animorphs, Everworld and Remnants with her husband Michael Grant.

Following the end of Remnants, Applegate took three years off. Upon returning to writing, she wrote a picture book, Buffalo Storm, a middle reader novel, Home of the Brave, and an early chapters series, Roscoe Riley Rules, with HarperCollins. Home of the Brave won the SCBWI 2008 Golden Kite Award for Best Fiction, the Bank Street 2008 Josette Frank Award, and is a Judy Lopez Memorial Award honor book.

Applegate won the 2013 Newbery Medal for The One and Only Ivan, drawn by Patricia Castelao and published by HarperCollins. The annual award, granted by the American Library Association, recognizes the previous year's "most distinguished contribution to American literature for children." The story, based on the real-life Ivan the gorilla, is written from Ivan's viewpoint as he lives in a glass cage in a shopping mall. According to the award committee: "Applegate gives readers a unique and unforgettable gorilla's-eye-view of the world that challenges the way we look at animals and at ourselves." The book was adapted into a film, which was released in 2020. The book was followed by sequels The One and Only Bob in 2020, The One and Only Ruby in 2023 and The One and Only Family in 2024.

== Personal life ==
Applegate married Michael Grant in 1979. Applegate has co-authored with Grant on several projects, including Animorphs and Everworld. They often use the name "K.A. Applegate" for their co-authored works. In 1997, Applegate and Grant had their first child, who came out as a transgender woman in 2016. In 2003, they adopted a daughter, Julia, from China.

Applegate is supportive of LGBTQ and transgender rights. In a 2022 Instagram post, she criticized Texas governor Greg Abbott for his directive to investigate gender-affirming medical treatments as child abuse. She also revealed she had an abortion in 1979, and criticized the 2022 murder charge against Texas resident Lizelle Herrera for a "self-induced abortion".

== Selected works ==
=== Stand alone books ===
==== Picture books ====
- Jack Rabbit and the Beanstalk (1998)
- The Buffalo Storm (2007)
- Sometimes You Fly (2018)
- Ivan: A Gorilla's True Story (2020)

==== Other books ====
- The Story of Two American Generals: Benjamin O. Davis Jr. and Colin L. Powell (1991; nonfiction)
- Please Don't Go (1992)
- My Sister's Boyfriend (1992)
- The World's Best Jinx McGee (1992)
- The Unbelieveable Truth (1992)
- Disney's The Little Mermaid prequels (1994): King Triton, Beware!; The Haunted Palace; The Boyfriend Mix-Up
- Disney's Christmas With All the Trimmings: Original Stories and Crafts from Mickey Mouse and Friends (1994)
- Sharing Sam (1995)
- Tales from Agrabah: Seven Original Stories of Aladdin and Jasmine (1995)
- Listen to My Heart (1996)
- Off Limits (2001)
- Home of the Brave (2007)
- Eve & Adam (with Michael Grant) (2012)
- Crenshaw (2015)
- Wishtree (2017)
- Willodeen (2021)
- Odder (2022)
- Pocket Bear (2025)
- Wombat Waiting (2026)

==== Published under pseudonyms ====
- L.E. Blair: Girl Talk novels
- Katherine Kendall (with Michael Grant): Harlequin romance novels
- Beth Kincaid: Silver Creek Riders series
- A.R. Plumb, and later, as Katherine Applegate: Disney's Aladdin series
- Pat Pollari: Barf-O-Rama series
- Nicholas Stephens: Disney's Enter If You Dare: Scary Tales from the Haunted Mansion (1995); Disney's Climb Aboard If You Dare: Stories from the Pirates of the Caribbean (1996)

=== Ocean City / Making Waves series (1993 - 1995) ===
Originally published as Ocean City and republished as Making Waves, this series is unrelated to the Summer / Making Waves series below.

1. Making Waves (1993)
2. Tease (1993)
3. Sweet (1993)
4. Thrill (1993)
5. Heat (1994)
6. Heat Wave (1994)
7. Bonfire (1994)
8. Swept Away (1995)
9. Shipwrecked (1995)
10. Beach Party (1995)
11. Forever (1995)

=== Making Out series (1994 - 1998) ===
First edition publication dates are based upon the original publication when the series was titled Boyfriends/Girlfriends. Only the first eight books were written by Applegate. Books 9–28 were ghostwritten. The 28 books in this series are:

1. Zoey Fools Around (1994)
2. Jake Finds Out (1994)
3. Nina Won't Tell (1994)
4. Slater's In Love (1994)
5. Claire Gets Caught (1994)
6. What Zoey Saw (1994)
7. Lucas Gets Hurt (1994)
8. Aisha Goes Wild (1994)
9. Zoey Plays Games (1996)
10. Nina Shapes Up (1996)
11. Ben Takes a Chance (1996)
12. Claire Can't Lose (1996)
13. Don't Tell Zoey (1996)
14. Aaron Lets Go (1996)
15. Who Loves Kate? (1996)
16. Lara Gets Even (1996)
17. Two-Timing Aisha (1996)
18. Zoey Speaks Out (1996)
19. Kate Finds Love (1997)
20. Never Trust Lara (1997)
21. Trouble with Aaron (1997)
22. Always Loving Zoey (1997)
23. Lara Gets Lucky (1997)
24. Now Zoey's Alone (1997)
25. Don't Forget Lara (1998)
26. Zoey's Broken Heart (1998)
27. Falling for Claire (1998)
28. Zoey Comes Home (1998)

=== Summer series (1995 - 1996) ===
This series was originally published as Making Waves in the UK.

1. June Dreams (1995)
2. July's Promise (1995)
3. August Magic (1995)
4. Beaches, Boys, and Betrayal (1996)
5. Sand, Surf, and Secrets (1996)
6. Rays, Romance, and Rivalry (1996)
7. Christmas Special Edition (1996)
8. Spring Break Reunion (1996)

=== Animorphs series (1996 - 2001) ===
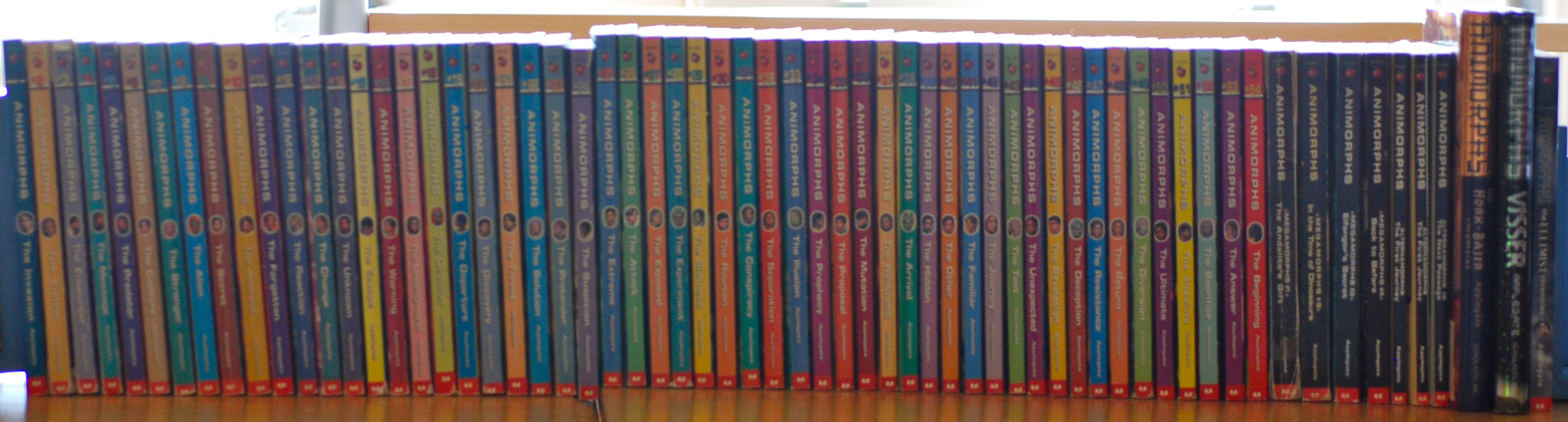
Collection of Animorphs books

There are greater than fifty books in this series, there is a difference between their publication and chronological order, and some have been adapted to graphic novels and television episodes. See the main articles about the franchise, Animorphs and List of Animorphs books.

=== Everworld series (1999 - 2001) ===
1. Search for Senna (1999)
2. Land of Loss (1999)
3. Enter the Enchanted (1999)
4. Realm of the Reaper (2000)
5. Discover the Destroyer (2000)
6. Fear the Fantastic (2000)
7. Gateway to the Gods (2000)
8. Brave the Betrayal (2000)
9. Inside the Illusion (2000)
10. Understand the Unknown (2000) (ghostwritten by Elise Smith)
11. Mystify the Magician (2001)
12. Entertain the End (2001) (ghostwritten by Elise Smith)

=== Remnants series (2001 - 2003) ===
Only the first four books were written entirely by Applegate. Books 5–14 were ghostwritten by Elise Smith and Emily Costello. Applegate wrote the outlines for books 5, 6, 8, half of book 9, and 10, while Jeff Sampson wrote the outlines for book 7 and the other half of book 9. Beginning with book 11, Smith and Costello also prepared the outlines for the books they ghostwrote. The 14 books in this series are:

1. The Mayflower Project (2001)
2. Destination Unknown (2001)
3. Them (2001)
4. Nowhere Land (2001)
5. Mutation (2002) (ghostwritten by Emily Costello)
6. Breakdown (2002) (ghostwritten by Elise Smith)
7. Isolation (2002) (ghostwritten by Emily Costello)
8. Mother, May I? (2002) (ghostwritten by Elise Smith)
9. No Place Like Home (2002) (ghostwritten by Emily Costello)
10. Lost and Found (2002) (ghostwritten by Elise Smith)
11. Dream Storm (2003) (ghostwritten by Emily Costello)
12. Aftermath (2003) (ghostwritten by Elise Smith)
13. Survival (2003) (ghostwritten by Emily Costello)
14. Begin Again (2003) (ghostwritten by Elise Smith)

=== Roscoe Riley Rules series (2008 - 2009) ===
1. Never Glue Your Friends to Chairs (2008)
2. Never Swipe a Bully's Bear (2008)
3. Don't Swap Your Sweater for a Dog (2008)
4. Never Swim in Applesauce (2008)
5. Don't Tap-Dance on Your Teacher (2009)
6. Never Walk in Shoes That Talk (2009)
7. Never Race a Runaway Pumpkin (2009)

=== One and Only series (2012 - 2024) ===
1. The One and Only Ivan (2012)
2. The One and Only Bob (2020)
3. The One and Only Ruby (2023)
4. The One and Only Family (2024)

=== Endling series (2018 - 2021) ===
1. Endling #1: The Last (2018)
2. Endling #2: The First (2019)
3. Endling #3: The Only (2021)

=== Doggo and Pupper series (2021 - 2023) ===
1. Doggo and Pupper (2021)
2. Doggo and Pupper Save the World (2022)
3. Doggo and Pupper Search for Cozy (2023)
