= The One and Only Bob =

2020 book by Katherine Applegate

- Author: Katherine Applegate
- Illustrator: Patricia Castelao
- Language: English
- Genre: Children's literature
- Publisher: HarperCollins
- Publication date: May 5, 2020
- ISBN: 9780063041196
- Preceded by: The One and Only Ivan
- Followed by: The One and Only Ruby
- Website: www.theoneandonlyivan.com

The One and Only Bob is a 2020 children's book by Katherine Applegate and illustrated by Patricia Castelao. It is a sequel to the 2012 book The One and Only Ivan.

== Synopsis ==
The book follows Bob, an abused stray dog who befriends a gorilla named Ivan and an elephant named Ruby. After being adopted by kind human girl named Julia, Bob attempts to relearn how to trust humans. After a hurricane wrecks his town, Bob runs away from home to find his long-lost sister, who was once presumed dead.

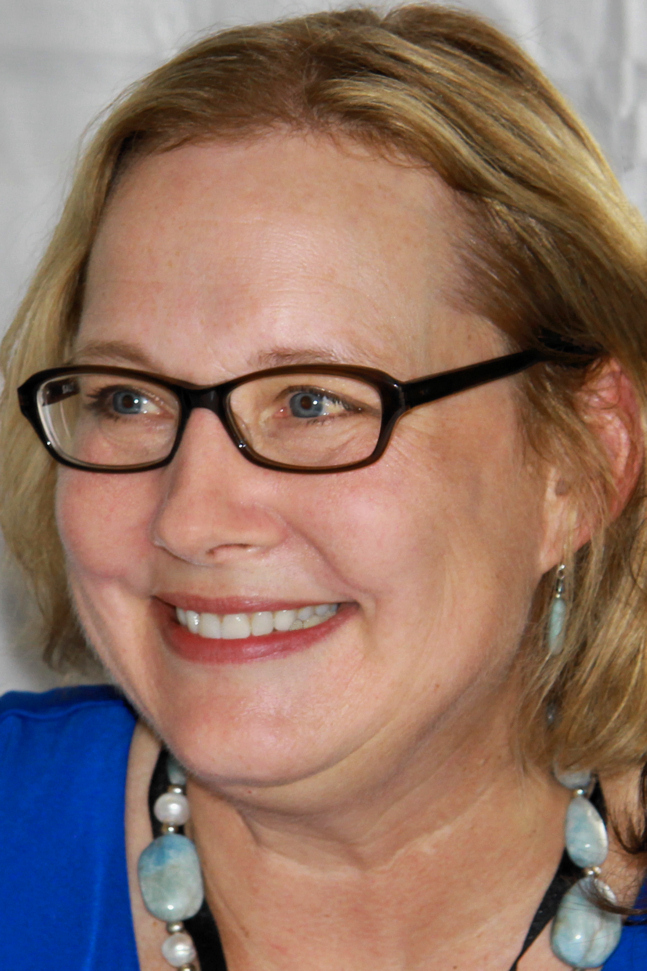
The book was written by Katherine Applegate

== Reception ==
Julie Jesernik, writing for School Library Journal, gave the book a starred review and wrote that "Bob’s story is delightfully heartfelt and adventurous. Castelao’s illustrations add additional beauty to the story." Mary Eisenhart of Common Sense Media gave the book 5 out of 5 stars, calling it a "compelling, ultimately uplifting tale, told by a snarky, formerly abused dog who's still confused about it all". Kirkus Reviews gave the book a starred review, praising the "wry doggy observations and attitude" of the main character.

Leonard S. Marcus of The New York Times wrote that "Applegate’s sure grasp of the essence of dog nimbly guides the early chapters even as the balance of Bob’s inner concerns shifts decisively from canine to human with talk of guilt, cowardice, forgiveness." However, Marcus criticized the hurricane sequence as being bland and unnecessarily long.

== Sequels ==
The book was followed by The One and Only Ruby in 2023, and by The One and Only Family in 2024.
