= Grossology (book series) =

Series of non-fictional children's books written by Sylvia Branzei

Grossology (ISBN 0-201-40964-X) is a non-fiction children's book written by Sylvia Branzei and published by Price Stern Sloan in 1992. It is a frank, thorough, yet light-hearted examination of various unappealing bodily functions and medical conditions. The topics are organized into three categories: "Slimy Mushy Oozy Gross Things" (vomit, diarrhea, urine, acne, blisters, etc.); "Crusty Scaly Gross Things" (dandruff, tooth decay, etc.); and "Stinky Smelly Gross Things" (halitosis, flatulence, etc.). The text is also accompanied by many humorous illustrations, which were provided by Jack Keely.

Grossology spawned several sequels, most notably Animal Grossology (ISBN 0-201-95994-1) and Grossology Begins at Home (ISBN 0-201-95993-3), both written and illustrated by Branzei and Keely. Animal Grossology, published in 1996, is an exploration of various organisms that either produce or consume unappealing substances. It is divided into four sections: "Vomit Munchers" (flies, starfish, etc.); "Blood Slurpers" (leeches, ticks, etc.); "Slime Makers" (hagfish, slime mold, sea cucumbers, etc.); and "Dookie Lovers" (tapeworms, dung beetles, etc.). Grossology Begins at Home, published in 1997, focuses on the hidden germs and unseen pests that thrive in a typical house. One of the highlights of this book is a chapter on Defect Action Levels, the acceptable amounts of animal contaminants and insect parts that can be found in foods. The book also teaches children how to grow their own bacteria.

Grossology has also inspired two CD-ROMs (Grossology: The Science of Really Gross Things (1997) and Virtual Grossology (1998)), a highly popular traveling exhibition, and a children's television series.

== See also ==
- Barf-O-Rama
- Slimeballs
