= Grossology (TV series) =

Canadian animated television series

- Title card
- Genre: Action; Adventure; Comedy; Science fantasy
- Based on: Grossology by Sylvia Branzei
- Developed by: Simon Racioppa; Richard Elliott
- Directed by: Matt Ferguson (S1); Kevin Micallef (S2)
- Voices of: Krystal Meadows; Michael Cohen; M. Christian Heywood; Paul O'Sullivan
- Composer: Paul Intson
- Country of origin: Canada
- No. of seasons: 2
- No. of episodes: 52

Production
- Executive producers: Scott Dyer; Doug Murphy; Michael Yanover; Sandra Itkoff
- Producer: Micheal Decsi (S2)
- Running time: 24 minutes
- Production companies: Nelvana Limited; Flypaper Press

Original release
- Network: YTV
- Release: September 29, 2006 – October 24, 2009

Related
- Spliced

Grossology (also known as Glurp Attack in Quebec) is a Canadian animated action-adventure television series produced by Nelvana and based loosely on the non-fictional children's book series of the same name by Sylvia Branzei.

The show first premiered on YTV in Canada on September 29, 2006. The original run ended on October 24, 2009. 52 episodes were produced.

== Premise ==
Ty and Abby are a teenage brother-and-sister crime-fighting team who report to the Bureau of Grossology, a secret government agency whose job is to investigate gross criminals and phenomena. Each episode of the series follows the pair on adventures based on real scientific facts. Aided by their friend Lab Rat (a tech specialist and a lab researcher), their boss, the Director, and their police liaison, The Detective, Ty and Abby work to keep the city safe, all while keeping their identities hidden.

== Episodes ==
- Airdates are from original Canadian broadcasts on YTV.

Season	Episodes	Originally released	
Season	Episodes	First released	Last released
1	26	September 29, 2006	July 28, 2007
2	26	September 6, 2008	October 24, 2009

=== Season 1 (2006–07) ===
No. overall	No. in season	Title	Directed by	Written by	Original release date
1	1	"Queen for a Day"	Matt Ferguson	Alice Prodanou	September 29, 2006
Ty and Abby must foil Insectiva's plot to use giant, mutated termites to destroy the city. Meanwhile, Abby and Paige fight over who should decorate the gym for the dance. Villain(s): Insectiva
2	2	"The Slim Slime Man"	Matt Ferguson	Hugh Duffy	October 1, 2006
A bitter sewer worker merges with a slime mould and turns into a monster who attempts to smother the surface dwellers in slime. Meanwhile, Ty tries to get more people to eat at the cafeteria. Villain(s): The Slim Slime Man
3	3	"Fartzilla"	Matt Ferguson	Sean Cullen	October 8, 2006
The villain, Fartor, wreaks havoc and seeks revenge on his cruel brother by causing a fart epidemic in order to fuel a giant robot called Fartzilla. Villain(s): Fartor
4	4	"The Perfect Stink"	Matt Ferguson	Simon Racioppa, Richard Elliott	October 15, 2006
Sloppy Joe, the world's dirtiest bad-guy, takes all the worst smells in the world and makes a giant stink bomb. Meanwhile, Ty asks Naomi out on a date. Villain(s): Sloppy Joe
5	5	"The Scab Fairy" "This Scab's For You"	Matt Ferguson	Ben Joseph	October 22, 2006
A former beauty queen, calling herself the "Scab Fairy", invents a weapon that allows her to steal people's scabs so that she can inflict them on others. Villain(s): Scab Fairy
6	6	"When Ya Gotta Go"	Matt Ferguson	Robin J. Stein	October 29, 2006
Lance Boil builds an infrasound ray gun that causes instant diarrhea, thereby severely hindering any police investigation. Villain(s): Lance Boil
7	7	"Club Parasites"	Matt Ferguson	Robert Tinkler	November 5, 2006
Insectiva has created a strain of giant mind-controlling head lice that grow on all the kids' heads at Ringworm High, converting them to zombies. Villain(s): Insectiva
8	8	"Go Fish"	Matt Ferguson	Richard Clark	November 12, 2006
Mutant hagfish attack the town. Ty and Abby follow their slimy trail of destruction. Meanwhile Ty and Abby get a pet kitten named Hairball. Villain(s): Hagfish
9	9	"It's Gotta Be the Shoes"	Matt Ferguson	Ben Joseph	November 19, 2006
A crazed basketball player creates a plague-like Athlete's Foot epidemic using his new brand of popular running shoes. Villain(s): Keith Van Kobbler
10	10	"Owl Most Foul"	Matt Ferguson	Dave Dias	December 31, 2006
A giant Owl terrorizes the people of town and especially its pigeons. Meanwhile, Lab Rat refuses to come out of the Gag Lab because of his fear of the outside world. Villain(s): Mr. Fowler
11	11	"Yack Attack"	Matt Ferguson	Alice Prodanou	January 14, 2007
A mysterious plague of uncontrollable vomiting has struck the city, even affecting Abby...which may mean the end of her career as a Grossologist. Villain(s): Sloppy Joe
12	12	"The Greatest Race Ever Crawled"	Matt Ferguson	Richard Clark	January 21, 2007
When the GRS-1 is damaged, Ty and Lab Rat design and build the TYMOBILE, a kicking set of wheels that can crawl, leap, or otherwise get around just like a Feline. Ty is then goaded into a race by Insectiva and her cadre of giant bugs, which is really just a cover for her deeper, evil plan. Villain(s): Insectiva
13	13	"Kid Rot"	Matt Ferguson	Robin J. Stein	January 28, 2007
There is a new kid in school, who kind of smells. This repels most kids but attracts Ty and Abby. A science lab mishap has caused him to have a "rotting touch," and everything organic thing he touches rots instantly. Villain(s): Kid Rot
14	14	"The Insider"	Matt Ferguson	Jeremy Winkels	February 4, 2007
In a plot similar to Fantastic Voyage, Lance Boil has perfected his shrink ray, and invaded Ty's body. Lance hopes to decrease Ty's I.Q. to zero, and heads for the brain. It's up to Abby to go in, and beat him singlehandedly. Villain(s): Lance Boil
15	15	"All Together Now"	Matt Ferguson	Ben Joseph	February 25, 2007
Instectiva, Lance Boil and Sloppy Joe join forces to shut down the Bureau of Grossology by afflicting the members simultaneously with villain-sized doses of horseflies, halitosis and acne. Villain(s): Instectiva, Lance Boil and Sloppy Joe
16	16	"Oldie But a Goodie"	Matt Ferguson	Richard Clark	March 4, 2007
When Abby defuses a mysterious device Lance Boil planted in the middle of town, she gets bathed in green pus that instantly starts her aging at many times the normal rate. Villain(s): Lance Boil
17	17	"Survival of the Grossest"	Matt Ferguson	Simon Racioppa, Richard Elliott	March 18, 2007
Competing in the school Science Fair, Ty's main rival is Patrick and his cool robot. Deciding to jazz up his fruit-fly project with a little mutagenic kickstart, things go wrong almost immediately. Villain(s): Mutant Fruit-Flies.
18	18	"School's Grossed Out for Summer"	Matt Ferguson	Ben Joseph	April 1, 2007
Ty, Abby, Paige and Naomi are locked in the school by a mad proctologist, Dr. Cornelius Colon. He then captures Paige and Naomi, hoping to use them as "nutrients" for a giant intestine he developed. Villain(s): Dr. Cornelius Colon
19	19	"Vein Drain"	Matt Ferguson	John Mein	April 28, 2007
When people start showing up with bite marks on their necks, Ty and Abby suspect vampires. But when they dig a little deeper, they discover that it's another kind of bloodsucker that's causing trouble – leeches! Worse, Abby is deathly afraid of these hungry invertebrates. Villain(s): Emily
20	20	"Silent But Deadly, Part 1"	Matt Ferguson	Simon Racioppa, Richard Elliott	May 12, 2007
Gassy super villain Fartor returns with a scheme to fart-up the entire planet! But with a plan this big he needs help, and he's got his sights set on Ty. Villain(s): Fartor and Far-Ty
21	21	"Silent But Deadly, Part 2"	Matt Ferguson	Simon Racioppa, Richard Elliott	May 19, 2007
Fartor and his new apprentice, Far-Ty join forces to drill into the planet core and turn the earth into one big gas planet. It is up to Abby to stop the gassy bad-guy and re-convert Ty back to an oxygen-breathing Grossologist. Villain(s): Fartor and Far-Ty
22	22	"The King of Rottingham Forest"	Matt Ferguson	Robin J. Stein	June 2, 2007
Kid Rot returns and his powers are out of control. The forest is rotting, and Kid Rot is behind the destruction! Will Abby and Ty stop his rotting tide of evil before he destroys the planet? Villain(s): Kid Rot
23	23	"Lights Out"	Matt Ferguson	Jeremy Winkels	June 23, 2007
A new nocturnal villain, Darko Crevasse, plunges the city into darkness with the help of his army of creatures of the night. Ty scrambles to shed some light on the problem before it's lights out for everyone. Villain(s): Darko Crevasse
24	24	"Boogerman" "FrankenBooger"	Matt Ferguson	Dave Dias	July 12, 2007
Sloppy Joe, the world's filthiest villain, has created a monster made of stolen snot. It's up to Ty and Abby...with some surprising help from both The Director and Sloppy Joe himself...to stop Frankenbooger before its too late. Villain(s): Sloppy Joe and Frankenbooger
25	25	"A New Leaf"	Matt Ferguson	Simon Racioppa, Richard Elliott	July 21, 2007
Abby learns what teamwork is all about when she's kidnapped and imprisoned in a hothouse full of giant, man-eating plants, and her only hope for survival is Insectiva! Villain(s): Insectiva and Sarah Senia
26	26	"Heave It or Leave It" "You Heave, You Leave"	Matt Ferguson	Robin J. Stein	July 28, 2007
Abby and Ty are jazzed to be contestants on the hottest game show on the planet where their gross skills and iron stomachs could make them stars. Only trouble is, The Director forbids them to go on. However they disobey him and go on anyway only to discover the show is an elaborate trap set up by Lance Boil. Villain(s): Lance Boil

=== Season 2 (2008–09) ===
Although Season 2 never aired on Discovery Kids or its successor, Hub Network, in the United States, this season aired years later on Qubo. Most episodes can be found on YouTube. The last 2 episodes did not air until 2017. "Pucker Up" and "Let Them Eat Fruitcake" both have not aired in Canada until years later, although they have aired in Australia before.

No. overall	No. in season	Title	Directed by	Written by	Original release date
27	1	"Sinister Rivalry"	Kevin Micallef	Richard Clark	September 6, 2008
When downtown turns into the site of the bug-battle of the century (insects vs. arachnids), it's up to Ty and Abby to take down Insectiva and her hated twin sister, Arachnidia (after all, arachnids eat insects).
28	2	"Flushed Away"	Kevin Micallef	Matt Sheppo	September 7, 2008
When alligators start showing up in people's toilets, doing your business becomes risky business. Meanwhile, inventor T.P. Skinner starts selling the Gator-Guard 5000, a gator-in-the-toilet trapping system, so Abby considers him a prime suspect...or is he?
29	3	"Vertigo a Go-Go"	Kevin Micallef	Robert Pincombe, Shelley Hoffmann	September 20, 2008
Lance Boil has planted a nanodevice in Abby's ear, and those of many other students, causing serious vertigo, as well as complete control of their every move. Ty's refusal to clean his own ears has led to a buildup of ear wax, making him the only one immune to Boil's weapon.
30	4	"Sloppy Joe to Go"	Kevin Micallef	Robert Pincombe, Shelley Hoffmann	September 27, 2008
Apparently renouncing his life of crime, Sloppy Joe has found an honest business venture, a fast food joint. But his overly-generous portions are actually part of a rather distasteful plot.
31	5	"Hairless Whispers"	Kevin Micallef	Jeremy Winkels	October 4, 2008
Frederick Follicle, a disgruntled former hair stylist with super-powered body hair, launches a hair-removal laser satellite into space, and Abby is among his first victims.
32	6	"Stinko"	Kevin Micallef	Richard Clark	October 11, 2008
There's a heatwave on . . . and there can't be anything worse in a heat wave than Sloppy Joe. How about Sloppy Joe, no water (thanks to Joe clogging the city reservoir drains with a giant load of his armpit hair) and no deodorant (thanks to Joe stealing all of it)? More? How about everyone slathering on Sloppy Joe B.O.-laced deodorant sticks thinking they're regular deodorant sticks? Even more? It's up to the germ & stink-terrified Lab Rat to save the day! Okay, that’s worse!
33	7	"Mold Monster"	Kevin Micallef	Robert Pincombe, Shelley Hoffmann	November 1, 2008
What's a little gross-crime in the name of the truth? Roger Pink-Eye steps up his attempts to solve the mystery behind Ty's and Abby's extra-curricular activities by creating a Mold Monster (by infesting cheese with black mold) to out our heroes as Grossologists! Will Ty and Abby get the double smackdown, defeated by a moldy monster and so long secret identity?
34	8	"When Allergies Attack"	Kevin Micallef	Matt Sheppo	November 8, 2008
With Lance Boil's new super allergy-causing spray-gun wreaking havoc with Ty's love life and almost splitting up our dynamic duo (Lab Rat and Hermes that is, when Lab Rat develops a mysterious allergy to the little guy), it doesn't look like things could get worse. Until Boil decides to drop a giant Allergy Bomb on this year's Carnival crowd.
35	9	"Pussed Off"	Kevin Micallef	Jeremy Winkels	November 15, 2008
When Ringworm High students mysteriously come down with a major case of pimple-itis (zits here, there and everywhere), Ty and Abby turn to an imprisoned Lance Boil for help solving the crime. Never short on plans of his own, Lance sends the Grossologists on a wild goose chase, giving him the perfect opportunity for a pus-villain team up. and a final old Fashioned confrontation at the school and both Ty and Abby are captured by Lance thanks to his inescapable loogie lasso, so it's up to Ty's best friend Andy to stop lance and save Ty and Abby from a pussy fate, and quickly!
36	10	"Ask the Dust Mites"	Kevin Micallef	Doug Molitor	November 22, 2008
Lab Rat invents a shrink ray...but in the process accidentally creates giant dust mites, who fall to the control of Arachnidia. Attempting to correct his mistake, he only makes things worse by accidentally shrinking Paige.
37	11	"Turd Wars"	Kevin Micallef	Dan Pilditch	November 29, 2008
An army of giant dung beetles has stolen all the manure from nearby farmland (with Sloppy Joe along for the ride), as part of Insectiva's evil plan. Meanwhile, Abby is forced to serve as the school's Hall Monitor, and help keep it clean...but Paige is determined to make her task impossible.
38	12	"Spa Insectiva"	Kevin Micallef	Dennise Fordham	January 21, 2009
When an ultra-exclusive spa opens, everyone goes gaga for its new line of bug-based creams, gels, and oils, created by Insectiva. Petunia Archer is given a free demonstration, but Abby suspects a hidden motive.
39	13	"Ain't Over Till the Fat Man Sings"	Kevin Micallef	Brian Hartigan	January 22, 2009
When a disgraced opera star returns to the stage, he's only singing one note: revenge! But his new opera stylings aren't music to anyone's ears, unless super-powerful and destructive burps are your thing.
40	14	"Candy Isn't Dandy"	Kevin Micallef	Terry Saltsman	February 6, 2009
When Gary Gumdrop, the ultimate candy man, hits town with his new treat, Gary's Gooey Gobbles, Ty's in heaven. This candy's delicious and good for your teeth...or is it?
41	15	"Swamp Gas"	Kevin Micallef	Doug Molitor	February 13, 2009
As floating balls of light cause power outages across town, everyone fears aliens are among us, except for the Grossologists, who are certain it is merely swamp gas. But when a giant one-eyed mechanical monster attacks them in the swamp, it might be time for a second opinion.
42	16	"Squirm"	Kevin Micallef	Matt Sheppo	February 20, 2009
It's time for an Archer Family daughter/son and father/mother adventure while Ty and Abby take on extreme sports together with their friends Daphne, Chris, Emma, Zack and Dana, Petunia and Harvey take on a Motocross Championship
43	17	"Let Them Eat Fruitcake"	Kevin Micallef	Richard Clark	2009
It's Christmas time, and everyone but Abby is feeling the Christmas spirit, especially Sloppy Joe. But while Abby is suspicious of Joe's good intentions, Lance Boil attempts to ruin Christmas with his pus-filled, bacteria-ridden fruitcakes.
44	18	"New Recruits"	Kevin Micallef	Richard Clark	February 27, 2009
Ty complains of boredom, and considers resigning from the Bureau of Grossology, when yet another mission to foil Lance Boil is deemed "too easy." Shocked by this attitude, Abby relates how they had become Grossologists in the first place...and they find out that their latest "success" isn't what it seems.
45	19	"Pinkeye & the Brain"	Kevin Micallef	Jeremy Winkels	March 6, 2009
Lance Boil's been kidnapped, and there is a long list of suspects! Could it be Insectiva? Sloppy Joe? No, it's Roger Pink-Eye! That's right, Roger's got Lance and he wants to know all of Abby's and Ty's Grossology secrets. And if the Grossologists don't find him fast, Lance just might spill the beans.
46	20	"Pinkeye's Revenge (Part I)"	Kevin Micallef	Jeremy Winkels	March 13, 2009
Lance Boil and Roger Pink-Eye have teamed up, and they've got a plan. They're going to make Roger's dream come true; he's going to become a Grossologist. All it's going to take is an army of rats and an evil clone of Abby! Too bad Roger's not watching out for the Lance Boil double cross!
47	21	"Pinkeye's Revenge (Part II)"	Kevin Micallef	Dan Pilditch	March 23, 2009
With Abby as a prisoner, her evil clone working an inside job at the Bureau of Grossology, and Ty and Lab Rat off the team, Lance Boil looks unstoppable! Now there's only one person left who can stop him, Roger Pink-Eye!
48	22	"Fangs a Lot"	Kevin Micallef	Dennise Fordham	June 15, 2009
When Professor Skinner's newest creation, Slitherbuddies (cute, genetically modified little snakes) hit the stores, everyone goes crazy for them. So crazy, in fact, that they ignore an emergency recall, until their slitherbuddies molt and become giant and deadly genetically modified mutant snakes. Then they can't get rid of them fast enough. Except for Abby, who just can't seem to let go of her deadly new pet!
49	23	"Hirsute Yourself"	Kevin Micallef	Steve Sullivan	June 26, 2009
When a hairy epidemic hits, you know Frederick Follicle's back in town. But this time, he's not just controlling his own hair, he's controlling everyone else's!
50	24	"Pucker Up"	Kevin Micallef	Dennise Fordham	2009
Insectiva and Sloppy Joe are out to ruin Valentine's Day and it's up to the Grossolgists to stop them!
51	25	"The Fart Side of the Moon"	Kevin Micallef	Matt Sheppo	May 13, 2009
He's back and more explosive than ever, it's Fartor! And this time his flatulent plan is on an epic scale. He's planning to send the universe's gassiest moon, Flatulen 4 on a collision course with Earth. But before he turns our atmosphere into one big fart, he has to overcome Ty, Abby, and Lab Rat in space! Lab Rat in space?! This is possible after an exact spacecraft clone of the Gag Lab is introduced. Will the Grossologists stop Fartor before the Earth becomes a gas planet (literally)?
52	26	"Night of the Living Roadkill"	Kevin Micallef	Brian Hartigan	October 24, 2009
Darko Crevasse returns with an eye to ruin Halloween using an army of zombie roadkill animals!

== Telecast and home media ==
The series premiered on the YTV network in Canada on September 29, 2006, with the final episode airing on October 24, 2009. The show was also aired on Discovery Kids / The Hub in the U.S. from January 13, 2007, until June 27, 2011. It also aired on Jetix on June 2, 2007, and Kix (later Pop Max) from September 15, 2008, in the United Kingdom, and on ABC in Australia in December 2007. The show aired with repeats on Qubo from 2016 through 2020. The show was formerly aired on Nickelodeon Canada, and later with repeats aired on Disney XD Canada. The show is now streaming on the premium Amazon Prime Video and Pluto TV.

The first official DVD release for this series was issued in Australia in July 2008. Two volumes are available so far:

- Grossology – Vol. 1: The Perfect Stink (Region 4 – Australia, PAL)
  - Released: 9 July 2008
  - Price: A$17.97
  - Label: Magna Pacific
  - Specs: Widescreen (16:9 Enhanced), Stereo (Dolby Digital 2.0)
  - Running Time: 132 minutes
  - Special Features: N/A
  - Episodes Included: "Queen For A Day", "The Slim Slime Man", "Fartzilla", "The Perfect Stink", "This Scab's for You", "When You Gotta Go"
- Grossology – Vol. 2: Yack Attack (Region 4 – Australia, PAL)
  - Released: 9 July 2008
  - Price: A$17.97
  - Label: Magna Pacific
  - Specs: Widescreen (16:9 Enhanced), Stereo (Dolby Digital 2.0)
  - Running Time: 110 minutes
  - Special Features: N/A
  - Episodes Included: "Club Parasites", "Go Fish", "Gotta Be The Shoes", "Owl Most Fowl", "Yack Attack",

In September 2008, they saw the first official DVD release in Canada. One volume is available so far:

- Grossology: The Perfect Stink (Region 1 – USA/Canada, NTSC)
  - Released: September 23, 2008
  - Price: CAN $15.99
  - ASIN: B001CQS7C4
  - Label: Phase 4 Films/Kaboom! Entertainment
  - Specs: Widescreen (16:9 Enhanced), Stereo (Dolby Digital 2.0)
  - Running Time: 90 minutes
  - Special Features: Bonus episode of Di-Gata Defenders
  - Episodes Included: "Queen For A Day", "The Slim Slime Man", "Fartzilla", "The Perfect Stink".

The entire series is also available on YouTube on the Keep It Weird Channel.

== Reception ==
Grossology received mixed-to-positive reviews from critics and audiences.

Emily Ashby of Common Sense Media gave the show rate three stars out of five, stating that "such topics offer ample breeding ground for jokes as well," and "nearly as entertaining [...] but rest assured that, while they're laughing, they'll be learning about science ... or at least it's yuckier side."
