= The One and Only Ivan =

2012 book by Katherine Applegate

- First edition
- Author: Katherine Applegate
- Illustrator: Patricia Castelao
- Language: English
- Genre: Children's Literature
- Publisher: HarperCollins
- Publication date: 2012
- Publication place: United States
- Media type: Print (hardcover)

The One and Only Ivan is a 2012 novel written by Katherine Applegate and illustrated by Patricia Castelao. Based on the true story of a silverback gorilla who spent 27 years living in a mall in Washington state, the novel is written from the point of view of Ivan, a silverback gorilla who lives in an enclosure at a mall. In 2013, it was named the winner of the Newbery Medal. The novel was adapted into a Disney+ film in 2020, and has been followed by three sequels: The One and Only Bob (2020), The One and Only Ruby (2023), and The One and Only Family (2024).

== Background ==
The novel is inspired by the true story of Ivan, a western lowland gorilla captured as an infant in the Democratic Republic of Congo. Ivan was brought to the United States and spent approximately 27 years living at a shopping mall in Tacoma, Washington, where he was kept in a small enclosure and used as a commercial attraction. His situation attracted growing public attention and advocacy from animal rights organizations throughout the late 1980s and early 1990s. In 1994 following a sustained campaign by activists, Ivan was transferred to Zoo Atlanta, where he lived among other gorillas for the rest of his life. He died on August 21, 2012, during a medical procedure. Katherine Applegate has described researching Ivan's real history as central to writing the book, and while the novel fictionalizes many details, the core circumstances of Ivan's captivity and transfer closely follow the real events.

== Plot ==
The story of The One and Only Ivan takes place at the Exit 8 Big Top Mall by the Video Arcade. Ivan, the Silverback Gorilla, has lived in captivity at the Big Top Mall for 9,876 days by his own tally. He lives in his enclosure, that he calls his domain, and is generally content with his life. He watches television (preferably reality television), eats bananas, and makes artwork that is sold by the owner. Along with Ivan, Stella, an elephant, and Bob, a stray dog, also live at the mall. Stella is an older elephant who has a chronic injury in one leg and regularly performs in the daily shows. Unlike Ivan, Stella has a long memory and can remember living in other places, like the circus where she was taught many of her tricks. However, Stella wanted to live in a zoo, because they have much wider spaces for their domains. Stella believes that good zoos are how humans make amends.

When Ruby, a baby elephant, is brought to the Big Top Mall to live with Stella and learn new tricks, things begin to change. Stella's old injury causes her to get sick from a infection. Just before Stella succumbs to her illness and passes away, she asks Ivan to take care of Ruby and find her a better place. Ivan promises he will take care of Ruby, even though he does not know how he will manage to do it.

After Stella's death, Ivan begins to remember his life before the Big Top Mall and what it was like to have freedom if only to have stories to tell to Ruby. While Mack, the owner of the Big Top Mall is trying to train Ruby to do tricks, Ivan witnesses first-hand the treatment to which she is subjected and begins to consider how to keep his promise to Stella.

When Julia, the custodian George's daughter, gives Ivan some finger paints, he begins to get an idea of how to help Ruby. He also changes his opinion of the Big Top Mall. He no longer thinks of his area as his domain but as a cage.

Ivan uses his art to make a large picture of the word "home". After Julia puts the letters together and discovers what Ivan is trying to convey, George and Julia help him by putting it on the billboard outside of the Big Top Mall. When people see the new signs, they begin to protest the treatment of the animals. Investigators are sent to the Big Top Mall and it gets closed down. Ivan, Ruby, and the other animals are taken away to a zoo. Ivan lives in a white box for a while, only getting occasional visits to the zoo so that he can get adjusted to being a wild gorilla. Soon after, he starts to live with his new gorilla family at the zoo. He later discovers Bob had become Julia's pet, and that he and Ruby had been both adopted by the same zoo, where they begin adapting to their new habitats and the other animals they now live with.

== Characters ==
- Ivan: A silverback gorilla who has spent most of his life in captivity and narrates the story.
- Stella: An aging elephant whose death prompts Ivan's determination to act.
- Bob: A stray dog who lives with Ivan in his domain.
- Ruby: A baby elephant who is new to the mall, and whose mistreatment drives the plot.
- Julia: The custodian's daughter whose friendship with Ivan and understanding of his art becomes the catalyst for the animals' rescue.
- Mack: The human owner of the mall and part-time circus clown, a financially struggling businessman whose treatment of the animals sets the novel's conflict in motion.

== Themes ==
The One and Only Ivan engages with themes of animal captivity, identity, and the ethics of keeping animals in human-controlled spaces. Ivan's narration positions him as a conscious and self-aware being, whose identity is shaped by the tension between the self he has constructed in captivity, and the gorilla he might have been in the wild, or the conflict between a captive identity and a natural one. The novel is an animal biography, a genre in which animals narrate their own lives in the first person to build empathy and moral awareness in readers. By telling the story through Ivan's perspective, Applegate uses animal focalization, a narrative technique in which an animal character serves as the lens through which readers experience events, encouraging identification and emotional investment. Ivan is given human language and interiority, allowing readers to access his inner life, but the novel is careful to ground his perspective in the physical realities of his captivity. Critics and scholars have noted that the novel invites young readers to reconsider the ethics of entertainment that relies on animal confinement, and to see zoo animals as individuals with histories and desires rather than objects of display.

== Reception ==
According to Kirkus Reviews, "Fittingly, Ivan narrates his tale in short, image-rich sentences and acute, sometimes humorous observations that are all the more heartbreaking for their simple delivery... Utterly believable, this bittersweet story... will inspire a new generation of advocates." Jonathan Hunt wrote in The Horn Book Magazine, "The choice to tell this story in the first person and to personify the gorilla with an entire range of human thoughts, feelings, and emotions poses important questions to the reader, not only about what it means to be human but also about what it means to be a living creature, and what kind of kinship we all share." Carolyn Phelan wrote in Booklist that "The text, written in first person from Ivan's point of view, does a good job of vividly conveying his personality, emotions, and intelligence as well as creating a sense of otherness in his point of view." Writing for School Library Journal, Elizabeth Bird said, "There's nothing twee or precious about it. Just good crisp writing, complex characters, and a story that will make animal rights activists out of the most lethargic of readers. Applegate has penned a real doozy of a book that speaks to the best and worst in all of us."

== Sequels ==
The One and Only Ivan was followed in 2020 by The One and Only Bob which was presented from the point of view of Bob.

A second sequel called The One and Only Ruby was published in 2023. The novel takes place after the events of The One and Only Bob, and is narrated by Ruby, who recounts her early memories of life in the wild to Ivan and Bob.

A third and final sequel called The One and Only Family was published in 2024. The novel depicts Ivan's life at the zoo, where he has formed a family of his own, and includes his reflections on his earlier years in Africa and the Big Top Mall.

== Film adaptation ==
On April 9, 2014, it was announced that Disney may adapt the book with Allison Shearmur to produce. On May 6, 2016, it was announced that Mike Newell would direct the film. On March 1, 2018 he was replaced by Thea Sharrock. The screenplay was written by Mike White. The cast for the film include Sam Rockwell as the voice of Ivan, Angelina Jolie as the voice of Stella, Bryan Cranston as Mack, Ariana Greenblatt as Julia, and Ramón Rodríguez as George, Brooklynn Prince as the voice of Ruby, Chaka Khan, Helen Mirren, and Mike White as the voice of additional animal characters characters. Danny DeVito was cast the voice of Bob, and Indira Varma and Eleanor Matsuura in undisclosed roles. Shearmur, who died on January 19, 2018, would still have a producing credit along with Jolie and Brigham Taylor. The movie entered production on the week of May 1, 2018. It was originally planned for a theatrical release on August 21, 2020; however, due to the theater closures impacted by the COVID-19 pandemic, it was changed into a Disney+ Original as a video on demand release.

Awards
Preceded by Dead End in Norvelt	Newbery Medal recipient 2013	Succeeded by Flora & Ulysses
Preceded by Hooper Finds a Family	Christopher Award; 2013	Succeeded by Flora & Ulysses
Preceded by Won Ton – A Cat Tale Told in Haiku	Crystal Kite Member Choice Award for California/Hawaii; 2013	Succeeded by Better Nate Than Ever
Preceded by The Pup Who Cried Wolf	Flicker Tale Children's Book Award for Intermediate Books; 2013	Succeeded by I Survived the Battle of the Gettysburg, 1863
