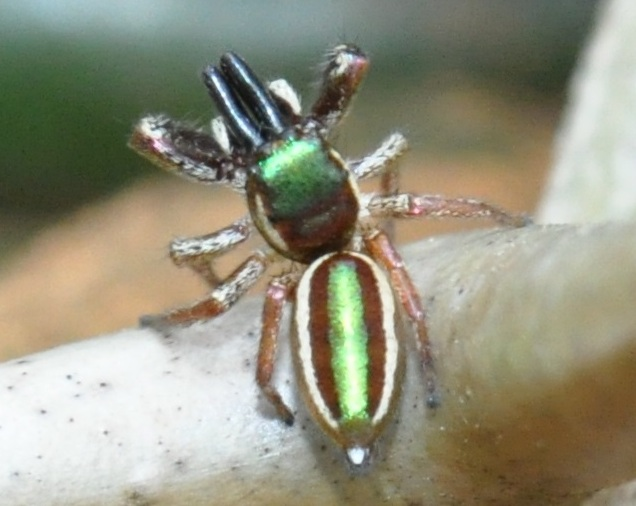

Scientific classification
- Kingdom: Animalia
- Phylum: Arthropoda
- Subphylum: Chelicerata
- Class: Arachnida
- Order: Araneae
- Infraorder: Araneomorphae
- Family: Salticidae
- Genus: Bagheera
- Species: B. kiplingi

Binomial name
- Bagheera kiplingi Peckham & Peckham, 1896

= Bagheera kiplingi =

Jumping spider from Central America

Bagheera kiplingi is a species of jumping spider found in Central America, including Mexico, Costa Rica, and Guatemala. It is the type species of the genus Bagheera, which includes three other species, including B. prosper. B. kiplingi is notable for its peculiar diet, which is mostly herbivorous. No other known species of omnivorous spider has such a markedly herbivorous diet.

== Taxonomy ==
The genus name is derived from Bagheera, the black panther from Rudyard Kipling's The Jungle Book, with the species name honoring Kipling himself. Other salticid genera with names of Kipling's characters are Akela, Messua, and Nagaina. All four were named by George and Elizabeth Peckham in 1896.

Only the male was described in 1896; the female was first described 100 years later by Wayne Maddison.

== Description ==
Bagheera kiplingi is a colorful, sexually dimorphic species. The male has amber legs, a dark cephalothorax that is greenish in the upper region near the front, and a slender reddish abdomen with green transversal lines. The female's amber front legs are sturdier than the other, slender legs, which are light yellow. It has a reddish-brown cephalothorax with the top region near the front black. The female's rather large abdomen is light brown with dark brown and greenish markings.

== Diet ==
Bagheera kiplingi inhabits Mimosoideae trees, "acacias" in the genus Vachellia in particular, where it consumes specialized protein- and fat-rich nubs called Beltian bodies. The nubs form at the leaf tips of the acacia as part of a symbiotic relationship with certain species of ants. The spiders actively avoid the ants that attempt to guard the Beltian bodies (their food source) against intruders. Although the Beltian bodies account for over 90% of B. kiplingi diet, the spiders also consume nectar and occasionally steal ant larvae from passing worker ants for food. Sometimes, they cannibalize conspecifics, especially during the dry season.

Despite their occasional acts of predation, the spiders' tissues have been found to exhibit isotopic signatures typical of herbivorous animals, implying that most of their food comes from plants. The mechanism by which they process, ingest, and metabolize the Beltian bodies is still unresearched. The vast majority of spiders liquefy their prey using digestive enzymes before sucking it in.

The degree of herbivory varies depending on environment. In Mexico, B. kiplingi inhabit more than 50% of Vachellia collinsii trees and feed almost exclusively on an herbivorous diet. In Costa Rica, the B. kiplingi population inhabit less than 5% of acacia trees and their diet is less herbivorous. Although this species is mostly territorial and forages solitarily, populations of several hundred specimens have been found on individual acacias in Mexico, with more than twice as many females as males. B. kiplingi appears to breed throughout the year. Observations of adult females guarding hatchlings and clutches suggest that the species is quasisocial.
