= Messua =

Messua may be:

- Messua (Jungle books), a fictional character in Rudyard Kipling's The Jungle Book and The Second Jungle Book
- Messua (spider), a genus of spiders
