= Adventures of Mowgli =

1967 Soviet film

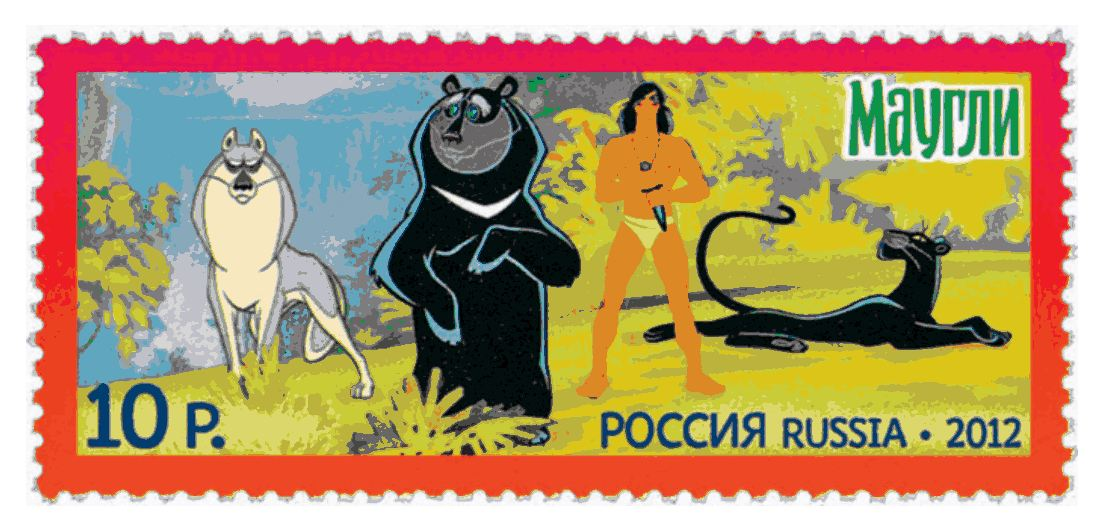
- Akela, Baloo, Mowgli and Bagheera in a scene from the movie on a Russian postage stamp.
- Directed by: Roman Davydov
- Written by: Leonid Belokurov; Rudyard Kipling (story); Ian James Corlett and Terry Klassen (English version)
- Starring: Sergei Martinson; L. Lyubetskiy; Lyusyena Ovchinnikova; Stepan Bubnov; Anatoli Papanov; Lyudmila Kasatkina; A. Nazarov; Klara Rumyanova
- Edited by: Lyubov Georgiyeva
- Music by: Sofia Gubaidulina
- Production company: Soyuzmultfilm
- Running time: 20 minutes x 5; 96 min 92 minutes (United States); 98 minutes (Japan, Taiwan, Philippines, India, Thailand); 100 minutes (Poland, Italy, Spain, Germany)
- Country: Soviet Union
- Language: Russian

Adventures of Mowgli (Russian: Маугли; also spelled Maugli) is an animated feature-length story originally released as five animated shorts of about 20 minutes each between 1967 and 1971 in the Soviet Union. It is based on Rudyard Kipling's The Jungle Book. They were directed by Roman Davydov and made by Soyuzmultfilm studio. In 1973, the five films were combined into a single 96-minute feature film. The Russian DVD release of the restored footage, distributed by "Krupnyy Plan" and "Lizard", separates the animation into the original five parts.

An English-language version made jointly by Soyuzmultfilm and Cyrillic Films was completed in 1996 and released direct-to-video on April 28, 1998 under the name Adventures of Mowgli. Charlton Heston is the narrator in the English version. Proceeds from the U.S. release were donated to The Audrey Hepburn Hollywood for Children Fund.

== Style ==
Contrasting with Disney's adaptation of the Jungle Book, Adventures of Mowgli is generally more faithful to the epic and primal content of Kipling's original work. Soyuzmultfilm's adaptation appeared more adult and in spirit is closer to Kipling's book. There are scenes of mass fights and duels, blood and death are shown, there is charged atmosphere and suspense. Subjects of life and death, debt and feelings, heroism of the warrior and human essence arise:

Two episodes end with images of death, and these images are Kaa's dance and Akela's song. Kaa is the embodiment of absolute power, unhurried and at the same time inevitable. Dying in the finale of the fourth episode, Akela is the embodiment of the archetype of a warrior who worthily meets death in battle and leaves for the fields of happy hunting ... In other words, the authors told us that childhood ends when you find out that death exists, and youth — when a person close to you dies. If you like — when you realize that you will die yourself.

— Sergey Kuznetsov, Iskusstvo Kino

=== Portrayal of characters ===
- In this version, Bagheera is female (following the Russian translation by Nina Daruzes and largely because the word panther itself in Russian is feminine, similar to the word fox and character in the local translation of The Adventures of Pinocchio). She is also less willing to spoil Mowgli, as she spanks him after he refuses to apologize for landing on Baloo, saying "Mind your manners!". This scene has inexplicably been deleted for the English-language version made by Films by Jove, though it appears uncut in the Cyrillic Films English-language adaptation. She is voiced by the famous Tamer of Tigers star, actress Lyudmila Kasatkina. She also was one of the rare installations of a strong female character in the soviet animation.
- Human characters like Messua and Buldeo are not present in this film.
- Bagheera has three cubs in this film, one black and two gold. They are only mentioned in the book while Bagheera's mate is not.
- While it is uncertain as to what bear species Baloo may be in the books, here he is an asiatic black bear.
- In this film, the king's ankus is replaced with a dagger, the Iron Tooth. This is the same departure as in Disney's later film The Jungle Book.
- Unlike most adaptations that show Tabaqui, this is loyal to the story and he is a golden jackal. In most adaptations like Jungle Book Shōnen Mowgli, The Jungle Book: Mowgli's Story and Mowgli: Legend of the Jungle, he is a hyena.
- One of Hathi's sons shows similarities to the baby elephant Junior, from the Disney adaptation.
- The ruins of the Forgotten City contain Buddha look-alike statues in Lotus position.
- White Hood, the white cobra guarding the treasures in an old cave, has also been changed into a female named Mother Cobra. She is also much more vicious than her book counterpart.
- Snake characters talk in a slow and hissy manner.
- Most instances of physical violence, brutality, and lethality are implied but not shown. The scenes of Shere Khan slaying numerous humans and animals are not portrayed, instead Bagheera is constantly accusing him of being a "Manhunter! Murderer! Baby snatcher!" and so on. Also his evil deeds are described verbally in brief by the narrator. The scene of the Kaa's hunt is ended right at the moment when Kaa is about to proceed to feast on the hypnotized Bandar-log population. Baloo is taking Mowgli away, saying that "We'd better leave now. This is something you shouldn't see". Only scenes of actual violence, which are portrayed, occur when: 1) Baloo and Bagheera are fighting the Bandar-log crowd in order to free Mowgli; 2) Mowgli, triumphant after he obtained the Iron Tooth, wields and accidentally hurts a paw of his Grey Brother wolf with the dagger, and apologizes right thereafter; 3) the Pack confronts the Red dogs; 4) the final fight.
- Shere Khan escapes the stampede and is eventually killed by the grown-up Mowgli in a bare-handed manner. The death of Shere Khan at the hands of Mowgli is implied by the next scene, which depicts Mowgli with the tiger's skin.

== Plot ==
=== Episode 1: Raksha ===
The story starts with a golden jackal named Tabaqui walking towards his master, the dreaded tiger known as Shere Khan, who stretches himself and then walks to the spot of a camp with Tabaqui guiding him. Out of cruelty and hatred, Shere Khan leaps towards the campsite. Whilst doing so, he accidentally burns his right forepaw, forcing a young child, Mowgli, to wander into a wolf cave in the jungle. At that point, Shere Khan (accompanied by his servant Tabaqui) appears at the entrance and, unable to pass through the cave's aperture with his massive body, demands that the wolves give him his prey, but the wolf mother, Raksha refuses and drives him away. He taunts them and says that the wolf pack will decide as he skulks away, angered by her defiance. Meanwhile, Tabaqui runs around the whole jungle and tells all the animals that a wolf pack has adopted a human.

A moment later, Bagheera, the melanistic Indian leopard, is minding her business when Tabaqui appears to tell her the news. Bagheera scolds him for spreading malicious falsehoods, then puts up quite a display that causes Shere Khan to walk away with hatred.

The elders of the wolf pack watch a performance of the wolf cubs and Mowgli, with the protagonist matching the cubs' every step. The elders are evenly split about whether or not they should allow him to stay until they see Mowgli pinch the nose of Tabaqui, who came up to taunt him. However, at this point, Shere Khan appears and demands that he be given his prey. Akela, also known as the "Lone Wolf" and patriarch of the pack, refuses to listen, so Raksha and Baloo (the white-chested bear who instructs the young wolf cubs) come to his defence, but Shere Khan is undeterred until Bagheera also appears and offers the wolf pack a freshly killed bull in return for keeping Mowgli alive. Shere Khan is forced to admit defeat, but he vows that he will still eat Mowgli one day.

=== Episode 2: The Kidnapping ===
Mowgli and Raksha's cubs are being taught to hunt by Baloo, who scolds Mowgli for running like a man, also teaches them the call of the jungle; "we be of one blood, thou and i" when they reached a watering hole infested with crocodiles. A bit earlier Bagheera appears and teaches Mowgli to climb and jump between trees. The Bandar-logs in the trees watch Mowgli free an Asian elephant calf from a pit trap set by hunters and decide that he is just like them but without a tail and that he could be useful.

A short while later, they kidnap him while he is sleeping and take him to their city. Baloo and Bagheera run after him but decide that they need the help of the Indian rock python Kaa. They don't know where to look until Chil the brahminy kite, flying above them, tells them that he saw him being taken to the abandoned city; Mowgli had used the call of the jungle as he was being carried away and asked him to help. Baloo and Bagheera arrive first and are both overwhelmed by the monkeys.

Once Kaa arrives, the monkeys go still and sit quietly on the city ruins around him. Kaa begins a hypnotizing dance, and every so often tells the monkeys to come one step closer. Bagheera and Baloo are nearly caught in the trap as well until they are pulled away by Mowgli, after which they leave the scene.

=== Episode 3: Akela's Last Hunt ===
Mowgli has grown and to enable him to take his rightful place in the pack, he needs to arm himself. Python Kaa helps Mowgli find an "iron tooth" - a knife, in an abandoned cave guarded by an ancient white Indian cobra. This happens just in time, because the old enemy tiger Shere Khan raises havoc in the pack, intending to kill Mowgli since Akela has missed his kill. The intervention of Mowgli saves the pack leader from Shere Khan through the use of the Red Flower along with support from Bagheera and Baloo.

=== Episode 4: The Fight ===
A terrible threat looms over the wolf tribe and all those living in the jungle. A large pack of dholes descends on the jungle, destroying everything in their path. However, Mowgli decides that he and Akela should prepare the wolf pack to battle the dhole tribes, with Baloo concurring with Akela's orders.

Tabaqui, nosy as always, reports the preparations for war to his master, Shere Khan, who muses the wolves forgot the rules of the jungle. Saying that it is every beast for themselves now, the big cat suggests heading north to wait for the battle to be over with, a suggestion his nosy majordomo agrees with.

Everyone evacuates for shelter while Bagheera relocates her three cubs (two yellow as gold and one the same color as Bagheera) to a safer spot where they remain until the war is over despite their earlier misbehavior.

At the river, Kaa suggests the aid of a huge horde of bees minding their business at the start of the waterfall. Mowgli delays the enemy horde for some time, and then, waiting for sunset, lures the dogs into the gorge by jumping from the cliff into the river. The dogs also end up in the river and are immediately attacked by bees. Some dogs are carried away by the fast current to the island, where they receive slaps from Bagheera. The main pack of dogs ends up on the river bank, where they enter into a terrible night battle with a wolf pack led by Akela. The bear Baloo and Mowgli, who climbed out onto the shore with the dogs, also take part in the battle. As a result, the young man and his friends, at the cost of huge losses, defeat the dholes, driving away the remnants of the dog pack. On the morning after the battle, Akela, who was seriously wounded in battle, dies, declaring Mowgli his successor before his death.

=== Episode 5: Return to Mankind ===
Mowgli is the head of the wolf pack. He sees people by the village, gathering some water, but he is confused about why he feels so different than the jungle folk. Finally it is time to pay Mowgli's arch-enemy, tiger Shere Khan, who broke the peace truce during a drought, but to slay him, Mowgli must devise a plan to trap him and his bumbling majordomo Tabaqui in the ravine using the buffalo herds. The plan fails when Shere Khan leaps to a high platform, with Mowgli hot on his tail. After a short brawl, Mowgli is able to finally put Shere Khan's law-breaking habits to an end by dislocating his skull. In the jungle, the time comes to upgrade and the flowering of love. Mowgli says goodbye to all his friends who say they would be happy to aid him. It is time to leave the pack and go back to the people.

== Crew ==
Note: Crew information for episodes 4 and 5 is incomplete.

	Romanized	Russian
Director	Roman Davydov	Роман Давыдов
Scenario	Leonid Belokurov	Леонид Белокуров
Art Directors	Pyotr Repkin; Aleksandr Vinokurov	Пётр Репкин; Александр Винокуров
Animators	Pyotr Korobayev (1, 2, 3); Boris Butakov (1); Aleksandr Davydov (1); Vladimir Zarubin (1, 2); Viktor Lihachyov (1, 2, 3); Viktor Arsentyev (1, 2); S. Zhutovskaya (1); Vladimir Krumin (1, 2); Valeriy Ugarov (1); Oleg Komarov (1, 2); Vyacheslav Kotyonochkin (2); Roman Davydov (2, 3); Oleg Safronov (3); Vitaliy Bobrov (3); Nikolay Fyodorov (3)	Пётр Коробаев; Борис Бутаков; Александр Давыдов; Владимир Зарубин; Виктор Лихачёв; Виктор Арсентьев; С. Жутовская; Владимир Крумин; Валерий Угаров; Олег Комаров; Вячеслав Котёночкин; Роман Давыдов; Олег Сафронов; Виталий Бобров; Николай Фёдоров
Camera Operator	Yelena Petrova	Елена Петрова
Executive Producer	A. Zorina (1, 2); Lyubov Butyrina (3)	А. Зорина; Любовь Бутырина
Composer	Sofia Gubaidulina	Софья Губайдулина
Sound Operator	Georgy Martynyuk	Георгий Мартынюк
Script Editor	Arkadiy Snesarev; Ian James Corlett (English version); Terry Klassen (English version)	Аркадий Снесарев
Editor	Lyubov Georgiyeva	Любовь Георгиева
Voice Actors	Sergei Martinson (Tabaqui — 1, 3, 5); Lev Lyubetskiy (Akela — 1, 3); Lyusyena Ovchinnikova (Mother Wolf — 1); Stepan Bubnov (Baloo); Anatoli Papanov (Shere Khan — 1, 3, 5); Lyudmila Kasatkina (Bagheera); Alexander Nazarov (Father Wolf — 1, Kaa — 5); Vladimir Ushakov (Kaa — 2, 3); Maria Vinogradova (Young Mowgli — 2, 3); V. Bubnov (Hathi — 2, 3); Yuriy Khrzhanovskiy (2, 3); Tamara Dmitriyeva (2, 3); Klara Rumyanova (2, 3); Lev Shabarin (Mowgli — 3, 4, 5); Yuri Pusyryov (Akela — 4)	Сергей Мартинсон; Лев Любецкий; Люсьена Овчинникова; Степан Бубнов; Анатолий Папанов; Людмила Касаткина; Александр Назаров; Владимир Ушаков; Мария Виноградова; В. Бубнов; Юрий Хржановский; Тамара Дмитриева; Клара Румянова; Лев Шабарин; Юрий Пузырёв
English Voice Actors	Cathy Weseluck (Young Mowgli); Ian James Corlett (Mowgli); Sam Elliott (Kaa); Dana Delany (Bagheera); Charlton Heston (Narrator); Campbell Lane (Baloo); David Kaye (Akela); Scott McNeil (Shere Khan); Alec Willows (Tabaqui); Don Brown (Chil); Pauline Newstone (White Cobra); Venus Terzo (Mother Wolf); Jim Byrnes (Father Wolf); Lalainia Lindbjerg (Gita); Harry Kalensky (Wolves); Christopher Gaze (Red Dog)	

== Technical details ==
During the 1980s the animated film was released in the USSR on VHS by Videoprogramma Goskino. In the early nineties it was released on VHS by "Krupnyy Plan". In the mid-nineties the cartoon series was also released on VHS by "Studio PRO Video" with Hi-Fi Stereo sound in PAL format. Also, the Lizard Company released the cartoon on Video CD disks.

In 2002 the film was restored and re-released on DVD by "Krupnyy Plan".

== American/Canadian version ==
The dubbed English version was completed in 1996 and released in the US on VHS on April 28, 1998, renamed as "Adventures of Mowgli". The American/Canadian adaptation made numerous changes for which it was subjected to severe criticism by those familiar with the original. Some music was completely replaced or added, and the narrator and some of the characters were dubbed to have many new lines which were not in the original film. Moreover, the film was subjected to some censorship: the scene in which Maugli chops off a tail of a wild dog was removed; during the battle with wild dogs shots in which Maugli stabs dogs were removed; during the final fight of Maugli versus Shere Khan, the blood-red final shots were cut.

== Legacy ==
According to TV Center, the old animation story is still popular in Russian-speaking countries thanks to the distinctive voice of Bagheera, voiced by Lyudmila Kasatkina. In 2016, Patrick Smith from The Telegraph also specifically praised the panther character from the "golden age of Russian animation". Smith noted: "While her voice might not fit Kipling's description of being 'as soft as wild honey dripping from a tree', she is bold and severe: in one instance, she scares off the terrifying tiger Shere Khan".

The notorious use of Kaa's phrase by Vladimir Putin, then Russian prime-minister, considering his opposition, "Come closer to me, Bandar-logs!" (Russian: Идите ко мне, бандерлоги, romanized: Idite ko mne, banderlogi) while adding, "I'm Kipling fan since childhood" (Russian: С детства люблю Киплинга, romanized: S detstva lyublyu Kiplinga), is unmistakenly associated with the adaptation because Kipling's book doesn't have the exact quote.

== See also ==
- History of Russian animation
- List of animated feature-length films
- List of Russian films
- The Cat Who Walked by Herself, a later Soviet feature film based on a Kipling story
