= Djungelboken =

Play written by Alexander Mørk-Eidem

- Written by: Alexander Mørk-Eidem

Premiere
- Date premiered: January 13, 2007

Djungelboken is a Swedish play written by Alexander Mørk-Eidem based on Kipling's The Jungle Book, with music and song lyrics by Eric Gadd. It premiered on Stockholm City Theatre in January 2007. While staying moderately true to the original with a few references to the Disney version played for laughs, the play is located in a post-apocalyptic Stockholm, specifically, a destroyed version of the square outside the theatre. The animals are portrayed not with animal costumes or make-up but rather as different social and cultural groups.

== Plot ==
In a distant and dark future, the world lies in ruins. Vast jungle covers where civilization once was and Stockholm is an overgrown ghost town inhabited by animals. The wolf Raksha, who is looking for food, finds an abandoned human baby. Tabaqui enters the stage and reveals that Shere Khan, the tiger, has killed four humans, among them the baby's parents. Raksha takes the baby to her mate Thuu and the pack-leader Akela and asks for permission to adopt the baby. Shere Khan arrives and demands the baby. Akela is offended by his demand, as the wolves consider themselves free, and calls for a council. Akela decides that if two speak for the baby, he will be part of the pack. None of the wolves are willing to, but Baloo, who has been sleeping in a dumpster, wakes up and speaks for him, as does Bagheera (who is portrayed as a transvestite) by offering the pack a buffalo he/she killed. Shere Khan is thwarted and Raksha adopts the baby, naming him Mowgli.

== The animals ==
Wolves: The wolves are portrayed as home-less/punks. Their social structure is the same as in the book. They have retractable "claws".

Tigers: Shere Khan is portrayed as a punk-rocker with a mohawk. Rather than claws he has large knives symbolizing his might.

Bears: Baloo is portrayed as a boxer, complete with boxing cloves and training clothes.

Monkeys: The monkeys are portrayed as extremely stupid Swedish upper-class, commonly referred to as fjortis. Unlike all the other animals, they seem to be unaware of the danger of the helicopters flying above the jungle. They refer to bananas as money and live in a place called "The Banana Republic".

Snakes: The snakes are portrayed as Japanese Kill Bill spoofs, to emphasize their lethality.

Vultures: The vultures are portrayed as extremely annoying paparazzi.
