= Sergey Kolosov =

- Сергей Колосов
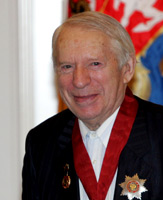
- Kolosov in 2007
- Born: Sergey Nikolayevich Kolosov; 27 December 1921; Moscow, RSFSR, Soviet Union
- Died: 11 February 2012 (aged 90); Moscow, Russia
- Occupations: Film and theater director, screenwriter, pedagogue
- Years active: 1952–2006
- Spouse: Lyudmila Kasatkina

Sergey Nikolayevich Kolosov (Russian: Сергей Николаевич Колосов; 27 December 1921 – 11 February 2012) was a Soviet and Russian film director, screenwriter, and pedagogue. People's Artist of the USSR (1988).

== Biography ==
He was born in Moscow into a family of actors Nikolai Alekseyevich Kolosov-Mayevsky and Lyubov Isidorovna Frank.

He participated in the Winter and the Great Patriotic War.

From 1948 to 1951, in parallel with his studies in GITIS, he worked as an assistant director in the Russian Army Theatre. From 1952 to 1955, he worked as the director of the Moscow Theater of Satire. In 1955, he went to work in a film studio Mosfilm and debuted in the cinema film Soldier's Heart in 1958.

In 1964, Kolosov as a director took the first Soviet television serial film Call Fire for Ourselves, in which the main role was played by his wife Lyudmila Kasatkina.

At the end of the 1970s, Kolosov became a teacher at the Faculty of Journalism of Moscow State University (Department of Television and Radio Broadcasting).

Kolosov died of a stroke on 11 February 2012 in Moscow. He was buried on 15 February at the Novodevichy Cemetery.

== Filmography ==
- Remember Your Name (1974, director and screenwriter)
- Mother Mary (1982, director and screenwriter)

== Bibliography ==
- Lyudmila Kasatkina, Sergey Kolosov. Fate on Two. Memories in Dialogues (2005)
