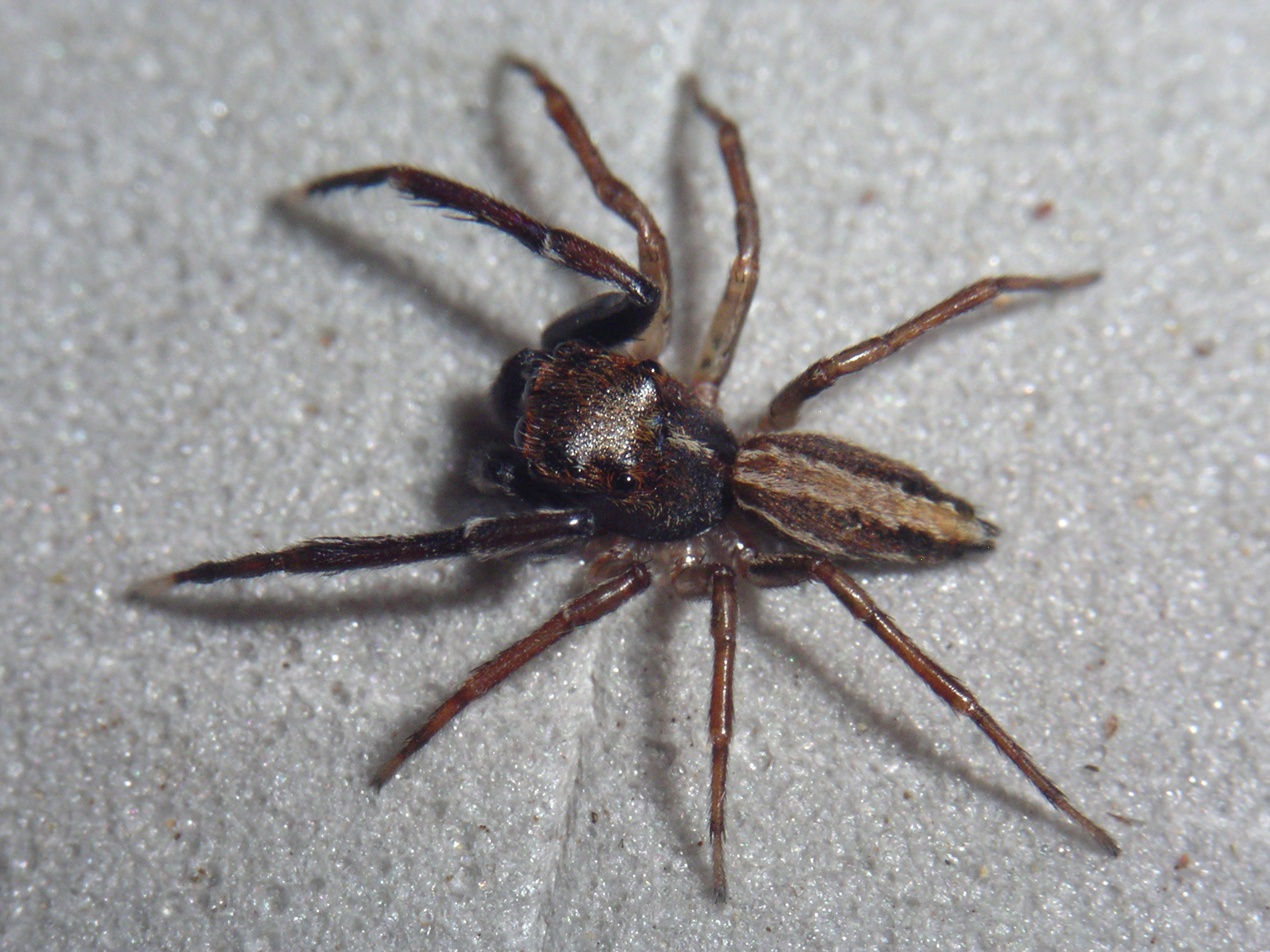
- Male Akela from Ecuador

Scientific classification
- Kingdom: Animalia
- Phylum: Arthropoda
- Subphylum: Chelicerata
- Class: Arachnida
- Order: Araneae
- Infraorder: Araneomorphae
- Family: Salticidae
- Subfamily: Salticinae
- Genus: Akela; Peckham & Peckham, 1896

Species
- See text.

= Akela (spider) =

Genus of spiders

Akela is a genus of jumping spiders (family Salticidae), consisting of three described species. Two of these occur in Central and South America and the third in Pakistan.

== Name ==
The genus name is derived from Akela, "The Lone Wolf" from Rudyard Kipling's Jungle Book. Other salticid genera with names of Kipling's characters are Bagheera, Messua and Nagaina.

== Species ==
- Akela charlottae Peckham & Peckham, 1896, found in Central America (Guatemala, Panama).
- Akela fulva Dyal, 1935, found in Pakistan.
- Akela ruricola Galiano, 1999, found in South America (Brazil, Uruguay, Argentina).
