= The Jungle Book (2016 film) =

2016 film by Jon Favreau

- Theatrical release poster
- Directed by: Jon Favreau
- Screenplay by: Justin Marks
- Based on: The Jungle Book by Rudyard Kipling
- Produced by: Jon Favreau; Brigham Taylor
- Starring: Bill Murray; Ben Kingsley; Idris Elba; Lupita Nyong'o; Scarlett Johansson; Giancarlo Esposito; Christopher Walken; Neel Sethi
- Cinematography: Bill Pope
- Edited by: Mark Livolsi
- Music by: John Debney
- Production companies: Walt Disney Pictures; Fairview Entertainment
- Distributed by: Walt Disney Studios; Motion Pictures
- Release dates: April 4, 2016 (El Capitan Theatre); April 15, 2016 (United States)
- Running time: 106 minutes
- Country: United States
- Language: English
- Budget: $175–177 million
- Box office: $967.7 million

The Jungle Book is a 2016 American fantasy adventure drama film produced by Walt Disney Pictures. It is a live-action/photorealistically animated remake of Walt Disney's animated 1967 film (itself loosely based on Rudyard Kipling's story collection of the same name) and the fourth adaptation by Disney thereof. It was directed by Jon Favreau and written by Justin Marks. Neel Sethi plays Mowgli, the orphaned human boy who, guided by his animal guardians, sets out on a journey of self-discovery while evading the threatening Shere Khan. The film includes voice and motion capture performances from Bill Murray, Ben Kingsley, Idris Elba, Lupita Nyong'o, Scarlett Johansson, Giancarlo Esposito, and Christopher Walken.

Favreau, Marks, and producer Brigham Taylor developed the film's story as a balance between Disney's animated feature film adaptation and Rudyard Kipling's original works, borrowing elements from both into the film. Principal photography commenced in 2014, with filming taking place entirely in Los Angeles. The film required extensive use of computer-generated imagery to portray the other animals and settings.

The Jungle Book premiered at El Capitan Theatre on April 4, 2016, and was theatrically released in the United States on April 15. The film was a critical and commercial success, with the Rotten Tomatoes critical consensus describing it "as lovely to behold as it is engrossing to watch", and grossed $967.7 million worldwide, making it the fifth-highest-grossing film of 2016. Amongst Disney's live-action remakes, the film is the eighth-most-expensive and fifth-highest-grossing readaptation to date. The film won accolades for achievements in visual effects at the 89th Academy Awards, 22nd Critics' Choice Awards, and 70th British Academy Film Awards.

== Plot ==
In the jungles of 1890s India, an orphaned boy named Mowgli lives among a pack of wolves led by Akela. One day, during the dry season, the jungle animals gather to drink the remaining water as part of an ancient truce. The gathering is disrupted by Shere Khan, a murderous Bengal tiger who threatens to kill Mowgli at the end of the drought. After the drought ends, the wolves debate whether or not they should keep Mowgli. Mowgli decides to leave the jungle for the safety of his family, and Bagheera, a black panther, volunteers to guide him to the nearby "man-village".

Shere Khan ambushes the pair on their way to the man-village, but Mowgli manages to escape by hiding amid a buffalo stampede caused by the tiger, and later encounters a seductive Indian python named Kaa, who hypnotizes him. While under her influence, Mowgli sees a vision of his biological father being killed by Shere Khan while trying to protect him. She also explains that there is a mysterious light called the "red flower" (fire) which brings destruction to anything it touches. Kaa attempts to devour Mowgli, but he is rescued by a bear named Baloo. (Note: While Baloo's appearance is based on a Himalayan brown bear, in dialogue he is referred to as a sloth bear.) Mowgli retrieves honey for Baloo as repayment and agrees to stay with him until the winter season arrives. Upon learning that Mowgli has left the jungle, Shere Khan kills Akela and threatens the pack to lure Mowgli out.

Bagheera eventually finds Mowgli and Baloo and is incensed that Mowgli has not joined the humans, but Baloo calms him down and persuades both of them to sleep on it. During the night, Mowgli finds the herd of Asian elephants gathered around a ditch and uses vines to save their baby. Baloo realizes that he cannot guarantee Mowgli's safety after learning that he is being targeted by Shere Khan and reluctantly agrees to push Mowgli away to get him to continue onward to the man village.

Mowgli is kidnapped by a gang of monkeys and Hoolock gibbons known as the Bandar-log, who take him to their leader, a deranged Gigantopithecus named King Louie. Assuming that all humans can make fire, Louie offers Mowgli protection from Shere Khan in exchange for it. Baloo distracts King Louie while Bagheera tries to sneak Mowgli out, but their ruse is uncovered. Louie chases Mowgli through his temple and informs Mowgli of Akela's death by Shere Khan. Louie's rampage eventually causes his temple to collapse on top of him.

Furious that his friends neglected to tell him about Akela's death, Mowgli goes to confront Shere Khan himself. He steals a torch from the man-village and heads back to the jungle, inadvertently starting a wildfire in the process. Shere Khan claims that Mowgli has made himself the enemy by causing the fire. Seeing the wolves' fear of him, Mowgli throws the torch into a river and proclaims his name to Shere Khan. Baloo, Bagheera, and the wolf pack hold off Shere Khan when he attacks, giving Mowgli enough time to flee into the burning jungle. Shere Khan overpowers all of them single-handedly and goes after Mowgli, who lures Shere Khan up a dead tree and onto a branch, before repeatedly antagonising and insulting him. Enraged, Shere Khan lunges at Mowgli, who swings to safety. The branch snaps under Shere Khan's weight, and Shere Khan falls to his death into the fire.

Mowgli then directs the elephants to divert the river and put out the fire. In the aftermath, Mowgli decides to stay in the jungle as his real home and utilize his equipment and tricks for his own use, under the guardianship of Baloo and Bagheera.

== Cast ==
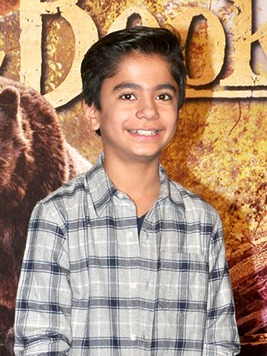
Neel Sethi, the actor who portrayed Mowgli

- Neel Sethi as Mowgli, a naive and stubborn 10-year-old human boy who was raised by the Seeonee wolf pack and wants to stay in the jungle despite the threat of Shere Khan. The search for casting Mowgli was extensive, with thousands of children auditioning from the United States, the United Kingdom, New Zealand, and Canada. Eventually, newcomer Neel Sethi was confirmed for the role, with casting director Rebecca Williams describing him as embodying "the heart, humor, and daring of the character. He's warm and accessible, yet also has an intelligence well beyond his years and impressed us all with his ability to hold his own in any situation." Sethi underwent parkour training in preparation for the role.
  - Kendrick Reyes as toddler Mowgli.
- Ritesh Rajan as Mowgli's father.

=== Voice cast ===
- Bill Murray as Baloo, a lazy and carefree bear who encounters and befriends Mowgli. Favreau had Murray in mind to voice Baloo since the beginning of the project: "He's perfect. Bill just exudes all the charm and humor that you need and expect from Baloo. He has a certain dryness and a rebellious quality." He had also always wanted to work with Murray, having been a huge fan of his work, though he was aware of how hard it is to contact him. Fortunately for Favreau, he was able to get a hold of Murray, and he agreed to come on board, with Favreau going on to comment that "once he came aboard, he was incredibly passionate. He has a very high standard." Murray said: "I just couldn't say no to playing Baloo. Jon [Favreau] is a terrific storyteller and I'm such a huge fan of the original stories. Kipling wrote a lot of amazing stuff. I read that book when I was about 22 and I've always thought that it was just extraordinary writing."
- Ben Kingsley as Bagheera, a wise and intelligent black panther who discovers Mowgli as a baby and later becomes his main protector. Favreau said that Kingsley "brought this elegance and refinement to the character, yet with great firmness. He's an interesting dude with crazy range." Kingsley said that Bagheera's "role in Mowgli's life is to educate, to protect and to guide." Kingsley said that Bagheera "is instantly recognizable by the way he talks, how he acts and what his ethical code is", and stated that "Rudyard Kipling's stories of Mowgli's adventures with these extraordinary, beautifully defined characters introduce many around the world to the Indian subcontinent and its culture" though he felt that both the film and the book's story was ultimately about Mowgli's search for a family: "There are many wonderful stories that are based on the struggle of an orphan to find a family—to create a family around him, which is a very poignant part of Jon Favreau's version of the film. It will have its beautiful, thrilling, exciting, joyous moments of celebration. But must also quite rightly have its darker moments, because we're dealing with a very isolated child who triumphs over enormous odds."
- Idris Elba as Shere Khan, a fearsome, powerfully built scarred Bengal tiger with a blinded left eye who wishes to kill Mowgli. Favreau felt that Elba's voice "wields tremendous presence in a room", and that "[Elba]'s got such gravity and brings his steely presence, a deep timbre that echoes in a larger-than-life way. He understands this scarred, imposing tiger in a way the character demands." Elba said that "Shere Khan reigns with fear. He terrorizes everyone he encounters because he comes from a place of fear." Elba was highly impressed with the film's effects, stating that "[w]hen Jon [Favreau] showed [Elba] Shere Khan's expressions and how he moves, [he] had to ask, 'Is that a real tiger?' The technology is incredible."
- Lupita Nyong'o as Raksha, a female Indian wolf who is Mowgli's adoptive mother. Favreau and Marks decided to give the character of Raksha a more predominant role in the film similar to Kipling's original tales. Favreau chose Nyong'o because he believed her voice imbued the emotion required for the role, commenting that "Lupita has tremendous depth of emotion in her performance. There's an emotional underpinning she brings, and a strength, and we wanted that for this surrogate mother. Much of that comes from her voice." Along with saying that she was a fan of the original Disney animated film, Nyong'o also commented: "I really enjoyed preparing for this and learning about wolves and how social they are, how they stick together. There's such an order—a hierarchy to a wolf pack. Mowgli tries to fit in with the other wolf pups. He has his challenges, but he is very much a part of the pack as far as Raksha is concerned."
- Scarlett Johansson as Kaa, an enormous Indian python from the jungle who attempts to eat Mowgli. Favreau decided to cast Johansson, a recurrent collaborator of Favreau's, to play Kaa, originally a male character, as he felt the original film was "a little too male-oriented". On Kaa's role in the film, Favreau said that "Mowgli is exploring different regions of the jungle—mistier, darker, more mysterious parts of the jungle. That's where Kaa lives. That's where she gets ahold of him—till Baloo rescues him and brings him back to his cave." Johansson said that "for [her], the opportunity to play Kaa as envisioned by Jon [Favreau] was so exciting", and described Kaa as "the mirror into Mowgli's past."
- Giancarlo Esposito as Akela, the leader of the Seeonee wolf pack who sends Mowgli to the Man-Village under Bagheera's guidance. Producer Brigham Taylor praised Esposito, claiming that "Giancarlo is an esteemed actor who absolutely embodies the nature of the character." Along with commenting that he's a fan of both the animated film and Kipling's books, Giancarlo described his character as "...a fierce patriarch of the wolf pack. He believes that the strength of the pack lies in what each and every wolf offers. He knows if they stick together, they can survive. He's a great leader, a wise teacher. I aspire to be like him."
- Christopher Walken as King Louie, a gigantic and deranged Gigantopithecus leader of the monkeys and Hoolock gibbons from the ruins of an ancient palace who wants to learn how to make fire. Favreau decided to change King Louie from an orangutan to an Indian Gigantopithecus (later reclassified as an Indopithecus) due to the fact that orangutans are not native to India, where the story takes place, although modern humans and Indopithecus never coincided, but he gives the animal a very similar appearance to a Bornean orangutan, contrary to evidence about Indopithecus. His character was given a slight alteration from the 1967 film and was partly inspired by Marlon Brando's character Colonel Kurtz in Apocalypse Now, as well as incorporating Walken's own physical mannerisms. In regards to Louie's changes, Favreau commented: "We created this looming figure that was trying to extract the secret of fire from Mowgli. And also this gave Mowgli the idea that if he had fire, he could have power over Shere Khan, whether it was good or bad. So there was Lord of the Rings aspect to that; the fire was almost like the ring in that was going to give someone ultimate power, but corrupt them as well as create destruction."
- Garry Shandling as Ikki, an Indian crested porcupine that collects things and is the first to notice the emergence of the Peace Rock. Ikki was not featured in the original film. This would prove to be Shandling's final role, as he died of a pulmonary embolism prior to the film's release.
- Brighton Rose as Grey Brother, an Indian wolf pup who is the youngest of Mowgli's adoptive siblings.
- Jon Favreau as Fred, a pygmy hog who is one of Baloo's neighbors. A character not featured in the original film.
- Sam Raimi as Giant Squirrel, an Indian giant squirrel who is one of Baloo's neighbors.
- Spike Jonze (uncredited) as Pangolin, an Indian Pangolin who is one of Baloo's neighbors.
- Russell Peters as Rocky, an Indian rhinoceros. This character was originally meant to appear in the 1967 film where he would've been voiced by Frank Fontaine, but Walt Disney scrapped the character.
- Madeleine Favreau as Raquel, an Indian rhinoceros who is Rocky's daughter.
- Sara Arrington as a Nilgai.

Emjay Anthony, Max Favreau, Chloe Hechter, Asher Blinkoff, Knox Gagnon, Sasha Schreiber and Kai Schreiber voice the young wolves.

Dee Bradley Baker, Artie Esposito, Sean Johnson, and Allan Trautman provide additional animal voices.

== Production ==
=== Development ===
"The idea of going out to the jungle and shooting this, it just felt like it wouldn't have the magic that the 1967 film had had. There was a dreamlike quality to it. There was a surreal quality to it. It was a high-water mark for character animation and to me, that's what I remember about it. And so I wanted to make sure we preserved that...But what [Alan] Horn said was: Look at the technology. Look at Life of Pi, Avatar. Why not use the technology to create a whole world that transports you? Let's really embrace this new technology and see what we can do if we push its limit".

— Jon Favreau on approaching the film's technical intent.

In July 2013, Walt Disney Pictures announced a live-action adaptation of Rudyard Kipling's short story collection The Jungle Book, with Justin Marks set to write the script. The film would be Disney's third live-action adaptation of Kipling's works, following the 1994 film and the 1998 direct-to-video film Mowgli's Story, and the studio's fifth overall after the 1967 animated film and its sequel. Jon Favreau was confirmed as director that November. As a child, Favreau used to watch Disney's 1967 animated film. He felt the need to strike a balance between the two films by retaining the buoyant spirit of the 1967 film, including some of its memorable songs while crafting a film with more realism and peril. He also stressed the importance of nature and realized how things have shifted during Kipling's time and now: "In Kipling's time, nature was something to be overcome. Now nature is something to be protected". He was encouraged by Walt Disney Studios chairman Alan Horn to take advantage of the film's setting and story as an opportunity to use the latest advancements in photorealistic rendering, computer-generated imagery, and motion capture technologies. The story of the film is not independently taken from Kipling's works, but also borrows cinematic inspirations from other films, including the child-mentor relationship in Shane (1953), the establishment of rules in a dangerous world from Goodfellas (1990) and the use of a shadowy jungle figure in Apocalypse Now (1979).

Pixar Animation Studios assisted in the development of the story, as well as providing suggestions for the film's end credits sequence. John Lasseter, Pixar and Walt Disney Animation Studios' then-chief creative officer, suggested to end the film with the original physical book featured in the 1967 film opening.

=== Filming and visual effects ===
Principal photography took place entirely on sound stages at Los Angeles Center Studios in downtown Los Angeles. The animal characters were created entirely in computer animation, with the assistance of footage of real animal movement, the actors recording their lines, and performance capture for reference. The production team underwent a thorough process to realistically convey the animals' speaking, while still making them perceptually believable to the audience. Favreau researched earlier films featuring anthropomorphic animals, including Walt Disney's animated features, such as Snow White and the Seven Dwarfs and Bambi, as well as more modern films such as Babe and adopted certain techniques from those films into The Jungle Book. Nearly 70 separate species of animals native to India are featured in the film, with several species being portrayed as "150% larger" than their actual counterparts.

Jim Henson's Creature Shop was brought in to provide animal puppet figures for Sethi to act against, although none appear in the finished film. The animal puppets were performed by Artie Esposito, Sean Johnson, Allan Trautman, and April Warren. Favreau utilized motion capture with certain actors, expressing a desire to avoid overusing the technology in order to prevent evoking an uncanny valley effect. For instance, Bill Murray's lifted eyebrow was incorporated into Baloo's facial gestures.

The Moving Picture Company (MPC) and Weta Digital created the film's visual effects. MPC developed new software for animating muscular structure in the animals. Around 1,000 remote jungle locations in India were photographed and used as a reference in post-production. Weta was responsible for animating the King Louie sequence, with visual effects supervisor Keith Miller adding that "it was important for Jon to see Christopher Walken in the creature. So we took some of the distinctive Walken facial features—iconic lines, wrinkles and folds—and integrated them into the animated character". Favreau expressed desire in wanting the film's 3D shots to imbue the abilities of the multiplane camera system utilized in Disney's earlier animated films. At Favreau's behest, the idea was extended into the film's version of the Walt Disney Pictures opening production logo, which was recreated as "a hand-painted, cel-animated multi-plane logo" in homage to the animated films of that era, also incorporating the word "Presents" in the same font as the 1967 film's opening credits. The film's ending also features the original physical book that opened the 1967 film.

=== Sound ===
Director Jon Favreau and composer John Debney sought to recreate the Fantasound experience Walt Disney, himself, had in mind. When mixing the soundtrack in Dolby Atmos, as Favreau said: "We isolated instruments when we could. And in the sound mix, we created a Fantasound mix. If you see the film in Atmos, you will feel that there are instruments that move around the theater". Fantasound is mentioned in the film's closing credits.

== Music ==
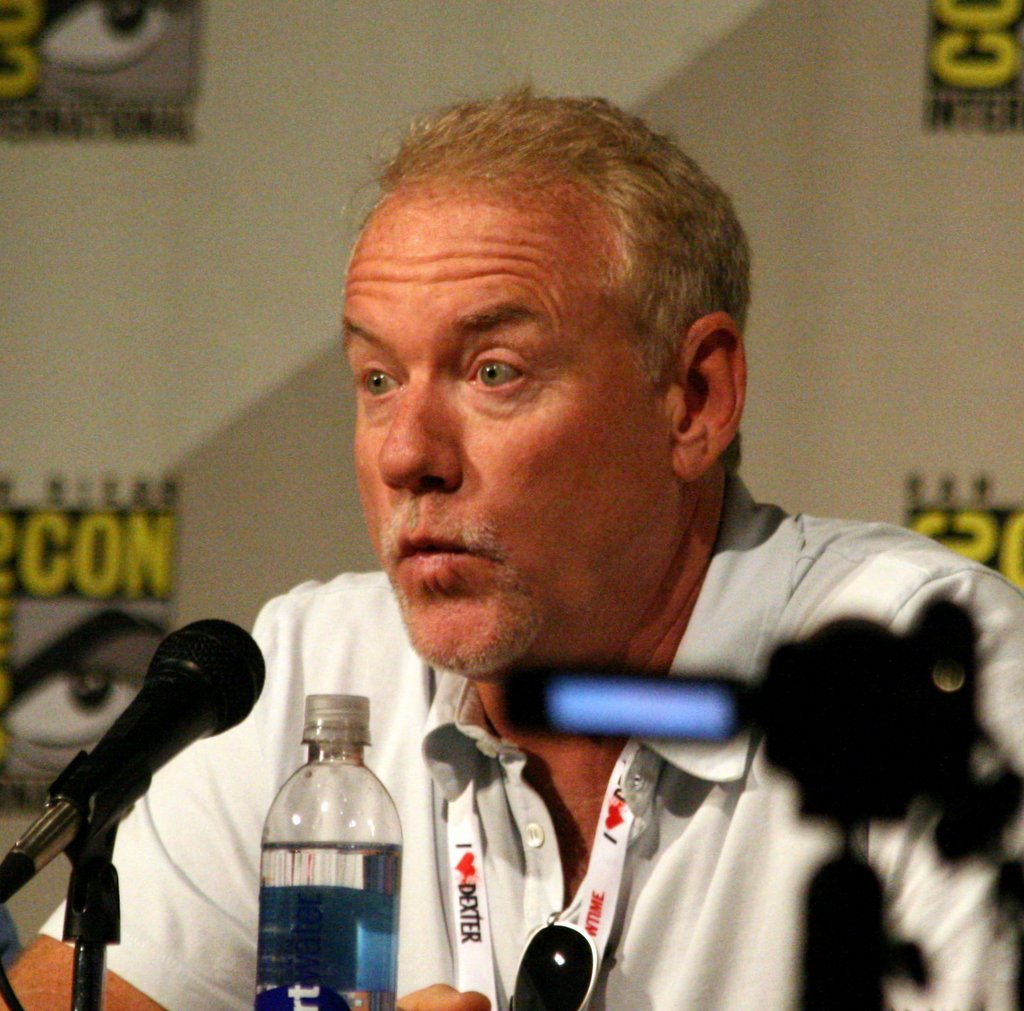
John Debney composed the film's score.

The musical score for The Jungle Book was composed and conducted by frequent Favreau collaborator John Debney, mostly drawing from George Bruns' original music. According to Debney, "Jon [Favreau] wanted a timeless sound to the score and I embraced that". Debney created a theme for Mowgli that is "not overly emotional. It has an elegance and majesty to it. He's becoming a man through this whole experience and that's what [Debney and Favreau] wanted to say with his theme". Shere Khan's theme was conformed of a three or four-note motif, while Baloo's "called for quirky strings and bass" that is "frolicking and emotional". While Bagheera does not have a theme of his own, he is represented by French horns and strings, and Kaa's music features snake-like sounds, while King Louie's features many instruments, like percussion instruments, bass marimbas, etc.

While Richard M. Sherman, who originally co-wrote songs for the 1967 film with his brother Robert, was originally reported to be writing new songs for the remake, Favreau decided not to make the film a musical. Still, he and Debney incorporated several songs from the 1967 animated film. "The Bare Necessities", written by Terry Gilkyson, is performed by Murray and Sethi, and a cover version by Dr. John is featured in the end credits. "I Wan'na Be Like You" and "Trust in Me"—written by the Sherman Brothers—are performed by Walken and Johansson, respectively; Richard M. Sherman wrote revised lyrics for Walken's version of "I Wan'na Be Like You". Johansson's rendition of "Trust in Me" was produced by Mark Ronson and appears in the end credits only. Walt Disney Records released the film's soundtrack on April 15, 2016.

== Release ==
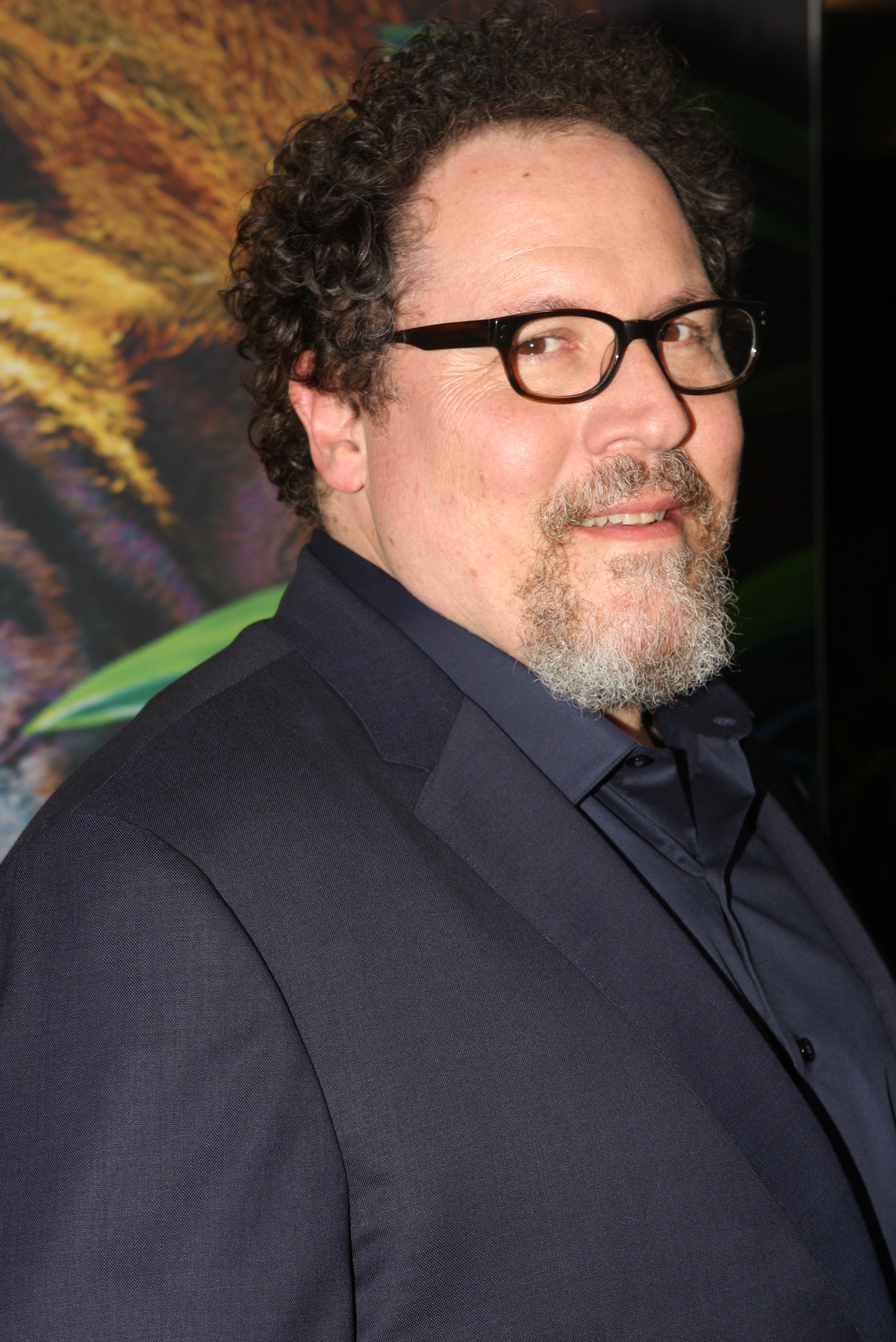
Jon Favreau at the premiere of The Jungle Book in Sydney, Australia.

The film was originally scheduled for October 9, 2015, but the film's release date was later postponed by Walt Disney Studios Motion Pictures to April 15, 2016. The film was released in the Dolby Vision format in Dolby Cinema in the United States, and is the first film to be released in Dolby Vision 3D (in a few select theaters in New York City and Chicago). The Jungle Book held its world premiere at the El Capitan Theatre on April 4, 2016.

It was released on April 8 in 15 countries, including Argentina, Australia, Russia, Malaysia, and India a week ahead of its U.S. debut on April 15. The release date in India was strategic for the film as it coincided with the Indian New Year and was a holiday in most parts of the country. The film had a special Hindi version with famous actors giving their voices to the main characters, including Irrfan Khan as Baloo, Om Puri as Bagheera, Priyanka Chopra as Kaa, Nana Patekar as Shere Khan and Shefali Shah as Raksha. As the Japanese anime series Jungle Book Shōnen Mowgli had been immensely popular in India in the 1990s, Disney India also commissioned a contemporary recording of "Jungle Jungle Baat Chali Hai" (originally used for the popular Indian version of Jungle Book Shōnen Mowgli), overseen by the original Hindi song's composers Vishal Bhardwaj and Gulzar, and released it as part of the film's promotional campaign in India.

=== Novelization ===
A tie-in novelization of the film written by Joshua Pruett and Scott Peterson was published by Disney Publishing Worldwide on March 1, 2016.

=== Home media and television ===
The film was released digitally on August 9, 2016, and on DVD and Blu-ray by Walt Disney Studios Home Entertainment on August 16 (August 22 in the UK). A 3D Blu-ray was said to be coming by the end of the year. The film topped the NPD VideoScan overall disc sales chart for two consecutive weeks. In the United States, the DVD and Blu-ray releases sold 2,027,137 units by December 2016 and have grossed $46 million as of August 2018. It is available on Disney+ as of June 19, 2020. The film had its network television premiere on TBS on May 31, 2018.

== Reception ==
=== Box office ===
The film became a huge financial success and a sleeper hit. It briefly held the record for the biggest remake of all time until the studio's own Beauty and the Beast surpassed it the following year. It grossed $364M in the United States and Canada and $603.7M in other countries for a worldwide total of $967.7M, against a budget of $175M. Worldwide, the film was released across 28,000 RealD 3D screens and had an IMAX worldwide opening of $20.4M from 901 IMAX screens, a new record for a PG film. It grossed a total of $39M in IMAX screens worldwide. On May 13, it became the second film of 2016 (after the studio's own Zootopia) to pass the $800 million mark. On June 10, it became the third film of 2016 after Zootopia and Captain America: Civil War to pass the $900M mark. Deadline Hollywood calculated the net profit of the film to be $258M, when factoring together all expenses and revenues for the film, making it the sixth-most-profitable release of 2016.

==== United States and Canada ====
Projections for its opening weekend in the United States and Canada were continuously revised upwards, starting from $60M to as high as $88M, with female and older male quadrants being the prime draw. The Jungle Book was shown across 4,028 theaters of which 3,100 theaters (75%) were in 3D, including 376 IMAX screens, 463 premium large format screens, and 145 D-Box locations. It opened on Friday, April 15, 2016, on around 9,500 screens across 4,028 theaters, and earned $32.4M, the fourth-biggest April Friday. This includes $4.2M from Thursday previews, the biggest preview number for a Disney live-adaptation film (tied with Maleficent), an almost unheard-of for a PG title which rarely attracts many ticketbuyers later in the night. In total, it earned $103.3M in its opening weekend, exceeding expectations by 40% and recorded the biggest PG-rated April opening (breaking Hop's record), the second-biggest Disney live-action adaptation opening (behind Alice in Wonderland), and the second-biggest April opening (behind Furious 7). It also performed exceptionally well in both 3D and IMAX formats, where they both generated an income of $44M and $10.4M of the film's opening-weekend gross, respectively, the later broke the record for the biggest April Disney release IMAX opening. Notably, it also became the only second PG-rated release to ever open above $100M (following Alice in Wonderland) and the third film of 2016 overall to open above $100M (following Deadpool and Batman v Superman: Dawn of Justice). It earned $130.7M in its first full week, the second-biggest for a Disney live-action adaptation, behind only Alice in Wonderland's $146.6M seven-day gross.

Buoyed by excellent word of mouth and benefiting from spring break, it fell only by 40% in its second weekend earning $61.5M, still maintaining the top position and far surpassing newcomer The Huntsman: Winter's War. That puts The Jungle Book in the top-fifteen second weekends of all time and in terms of films that opened above $100M, it scored the fourth-smallest drop behind Shrek 2 (−33%), Spider-Man (−39%), and Star Wars: The Force Awakens (−39%). Of those numbers, $5.6M came from IMAX shows for a two-weekend cumulative total of $18.4M which represents about 10% of its entire North American box office gross. It crossed $200M on its twelfth day of release and managed to hold the top spot for the third consecutive weekend with $43.7M from 4,041 theaters (an addition of 13 more theaters), a fall of only 29%, outgrossing the next six pictures combined (including the openings of three newcomers) and recorded the sixth-biggest third weekend of all time. Moreover, the 29% drop is the smallest third-weekend drop (from its second weekend) for a $100M opener ever. Disney added an additional 103 theaters for the film's fourth weekend of release which propelled its theater count to 4,144 theaters, but nevertheless, it was overtaken by Disney's own Captain America: Civil War after experiencing a 50% decline. It passed $300M on its 30th day of release, on May 14, as it continued to witness marginal declines in the wake of several new releases weekend after weekend. It made 3.53 times its opening weekend numbers, which is one of the biggest of all time for a film opening above $100M. It became one of the few surprise hits and one of the highest-grossing films of the year, alongside Finding Dory, The Secret Life of Pets, and Zootopia, centered around talking animals to dominate the year-end chart.

==== Other countries ====
The film was released in approximately 70 countries. Outside the U.S. and Canada, it opened across 15 markets and 69 IMAX screens a week ahead of its US debut, and faced notable competition from newcomer The Huntsman: Winter's War and holdover Batman v Superman: Dawn of Justice, the latter of which was entering its third weekend. The reason behind the divided release pattern was because Disney wanted to get some space before Captain America: Civil War releases in early May, as well as availing school holidays and avoiding local competitors. It eventually grossed $31.7M, debuting at first place in all markets and second overall at the international box office, behind Dawn of Justice, which was playing across 67 markets. In its second weekend, it expanded to an additional 49 countries (88% of its total marketplace) and grossed $138.6M from 64 countries, easily topping the international box office, a bulk of it came from China. Approximately 63% or $85M of that came from 3D screenings, with the largest 3D opening haul represented by China (98%), Germany (83%), Brazil (73%), Russia (60%), Mexico (47%), and the UK (39%). Ten million dollars alone came from 525 IMAX screens, a record for a PG and April release. It further continued to hold the top spot in its third weekend after adding another $98.9M from 53 territories, falling only by a marginal 32%. IMAX generated another $6.1M from 484 IMAX theaters for a three-weekend total of $20.6M. After three straight No. 1 runs, it was finally dethroned by the studio's Captain America: Civil War in its fourth weekend.

In India, it scored the second-biggest opening day for a Hollywood film, earning $1.51M (behind Avengers: Age of Ultron) from around 1,500 screens and went on to score the second-biggest Hollywood opening weekend of all time, with $8.4M from 1,600 screens, behind only Furious 7 in terms of local as well as U.S. currency, performing better than expected and its initial $5–6M opening projection. Its opening weekend in India alone surpassed the entire lifetime total of Disney's other live-fantasy adaptations—Cinderella, Maleficent, Oz the Great and Powerful, and Alice in Wonderland—in the country. It then went on to score the biggest opening and single week for a Hollywood film with $15.1M. In its second weekend, it dropped just by a mere 40% to $4.97M. In just ten days, it became the fourth-highest-grossing Hollywood film there with $21.2M. On Wednesday, April 19—its twelfth day of release—it surpassed Furious 7 to become the highest-grossing Hollywood/foreign release of all time there. By the end of its theatrical run, the film made an estimated $38.8M with half of its revenue—58%—coming from local dubbed versions, compared to Avengers: Age of Ultron, which saw 45% of its revenue from dubbed versions.

In China, where the film was locally known as Fantasy Forest, expectations were high, with projections going as high $154–200M or more. Ultimately, it was unable to hit these marks. Before the release of the film in the state, Disney had a very successful run at the box office with Zootopia the previous month, in which anthropomorphic animals were the central figure. Forbes noted that The Jungle Book was precisely the sort of film that Chinese audiences love with its 3D visuals, heartwarming story, and talking animal cast. It earned around $12M on its opening day, including $300,000 worth of previews from 65,000 screenings. Buoyed by good word of mouth and positive reception (albeit mostly from audiences with polarized reception from Chinese critics), it rose 72% on its second day to $20M. Through its opening weekend it grossed $48.5M, including $5.1M from 279 IMAX screens, a new record for April release. Its opening marked the biggest Walt Disney Pictures film opening ever, the second biggest for a family film (behind Kung Fu Panda 3), the second-biggest April debut (behind Furious 7), and the fourth-biggest Disney opening (behind Avengers: Age of Ultron, Iron Man 3, and Star Wars: The Force Awakens). It topped the daily box office through the whole opening week and went on to remain at the top of the box office for a second weekend, after dropping by a mere 20% to $29.8M, despite facing some competitions. It ended its run there with a total of $150.1M after 30 days of playing in theaters, adding $1.2M on its last day. Albeit falling just below expectations, it nevertheless emerged as a huge financial success and becoming the fourth-biggest Disney release there.

In the United Kingdom and Ireland, it had an opening weekend total of £9.9M ($14.1M) from 594 cinemas and in France with $8.1M. Elsewhere, the highest openings were recorded in Russia and the CIS ($7.4M), Germany ($5.1M), Spain ($3.9M), Australia ($2.8M), Argentina ($2.3M), and in Malaysia, where it scored the biggest opening weekend for a live-action Disney film with $2.3M. In the UK, it became the first film of 2016 to earn over £5M in three straight weekends and the first film since Jurassic World, Spectre, and Star Wars: The Force Awakens (all 2015 films) to achieve such an accomplishment, and the first film of 2016 to earn above £40M ($58M). In South Korea, it faced competition with Warcraft, but ended up debuting atop the charts with $6.2M. It has so far grossed a total of $18M there.

It opened in Japan on August 11, alongside the superhero film X-Men: Apocalypse and delivered a four-day opening of $6.2M from 676 screens ($3M in two days), debuting at second place behind The Secret Life of Pets. Although the opening figure was considered mediocre, Deadline Hollywood noted that Japan is a market that can see big multiples. It fell just 30% in its second weekend earning $2.1M for an 11-day total of $13.7M.

In total earnings, its biggest markets outside of the U.S. and Canada were China ($150.1M), the United Kingdom ($66.2M) and India ($38.8M). It was the highest-grossing film of 2016 in Europe with a total of $209M, the United Kingdom and Ireland, and in India (although it was later surpassed by Sultan, in terms of Hollywood/imported films, it is still the biggest).

=== Critical response ===
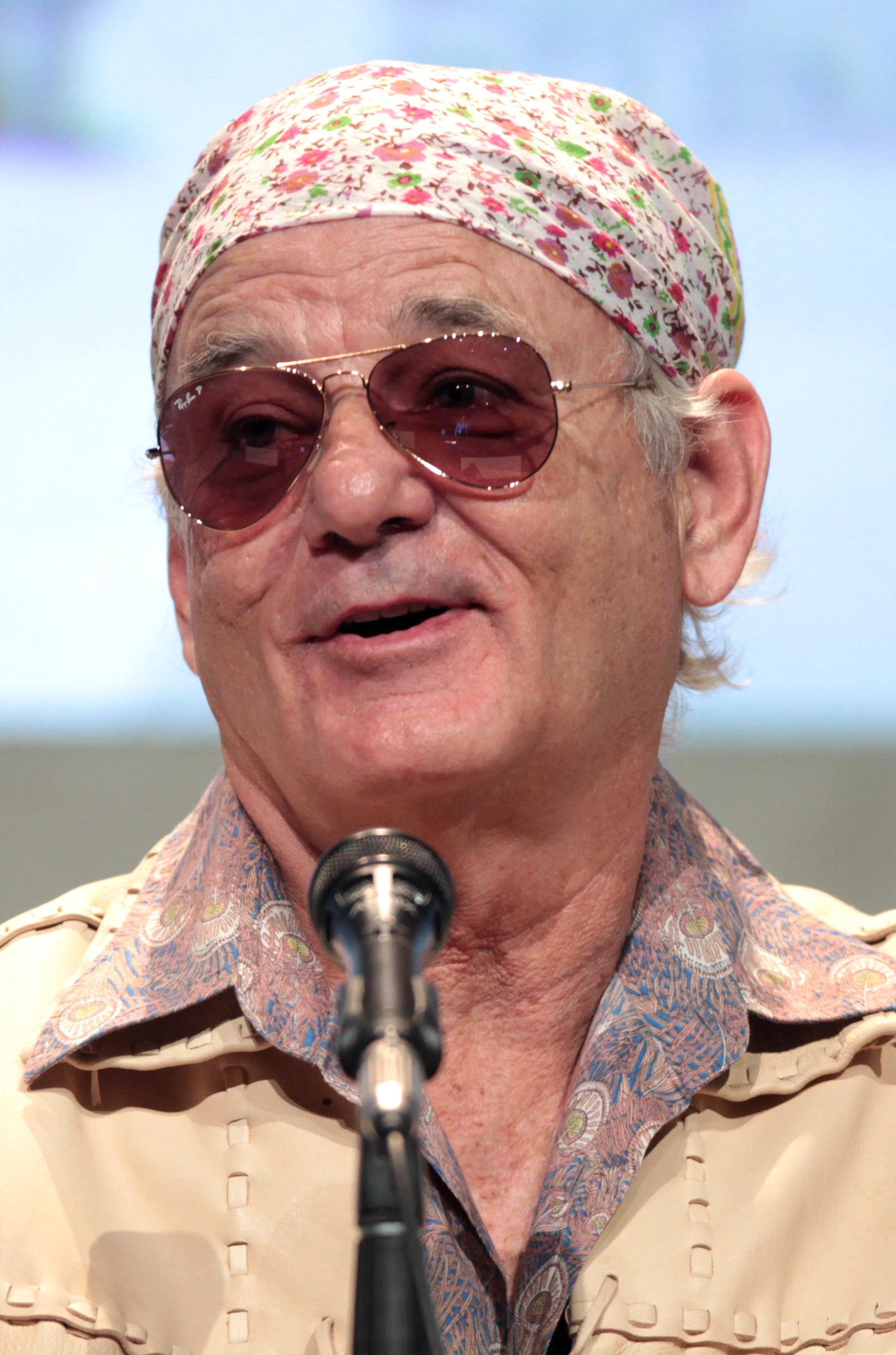
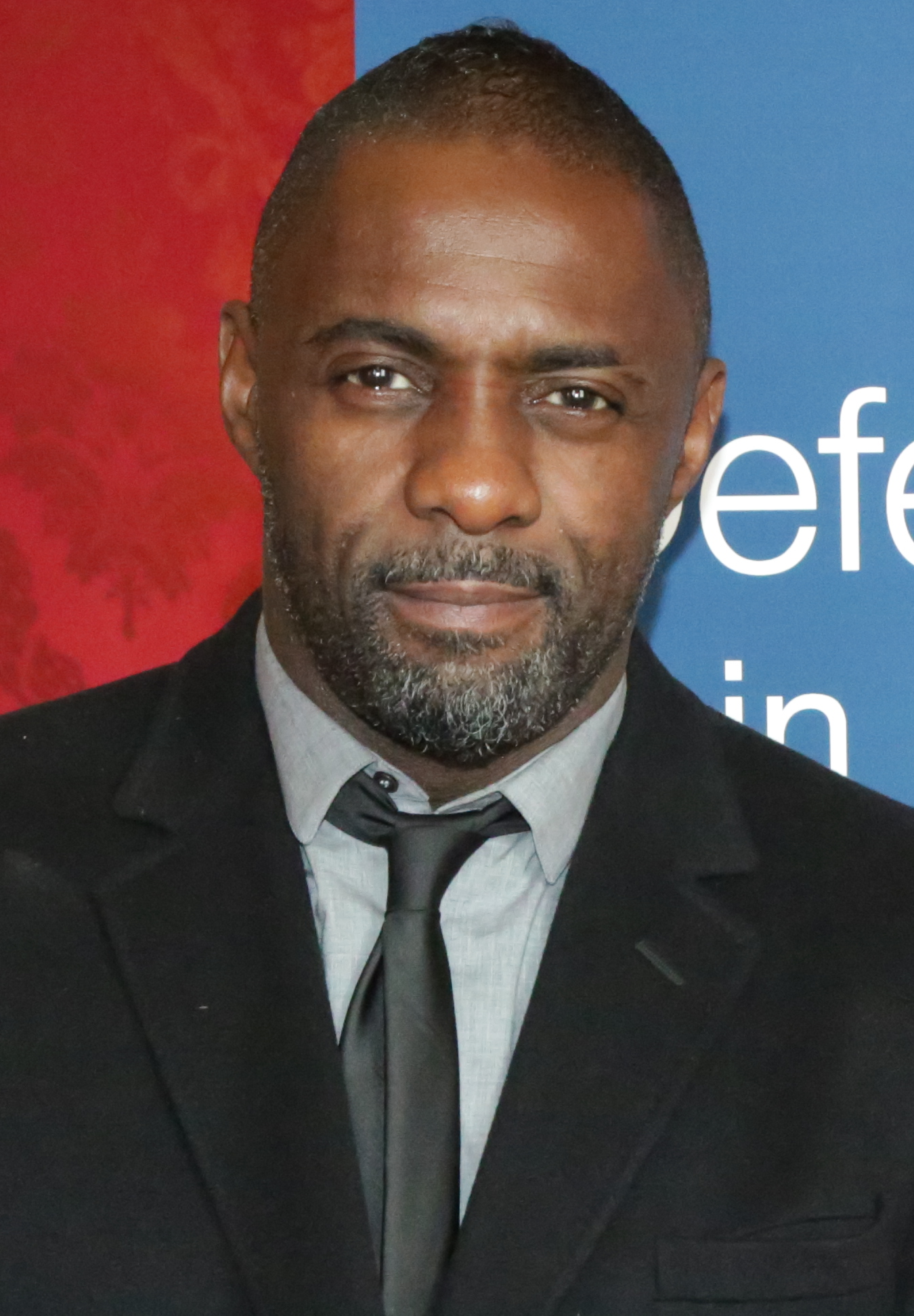
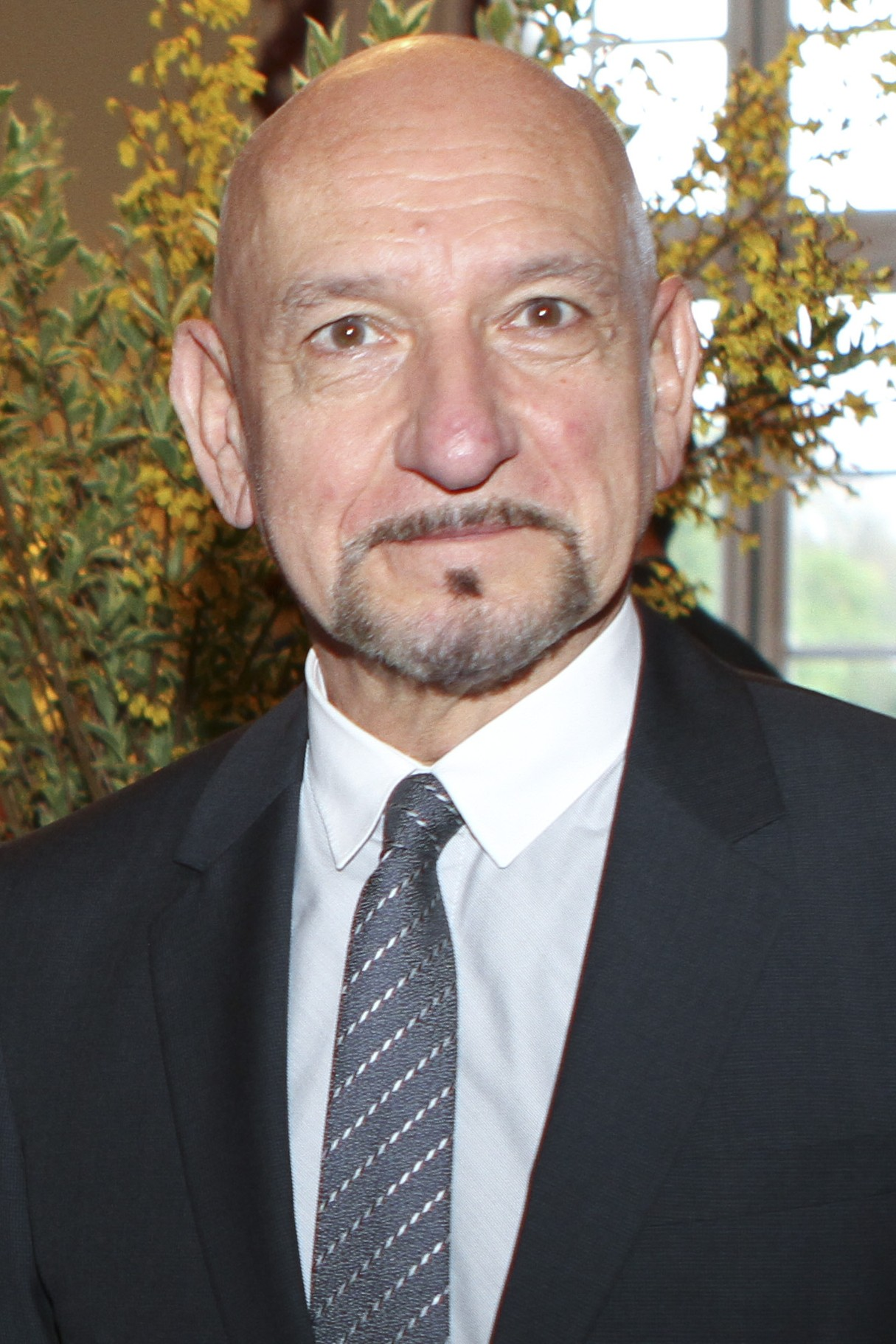
(L to R) The vocal performances of Bill Murray, Idris Elba, and Ben Kingsley were particularly praised.

On Rotten Tomatoes, a review aggregator, the film holds an approval rating of 94% based on 329 reviews and an average rating of 7.8/10. The site's critical consensus reads: "As lovely to behold as it is engrossing to watch, The Jungle Book is the rare remake that actually improves upon its predecessors—all while setting a new standard for CGI". On Metacritic, the film has a weighted average score of 77 out of 100, based on 49 critics, indicating "generally favorable reviews". Audiences polled by CinemaScore gave the film an average grade of "A" on an A+ to F scale, while PostTrak reported moviegoers gave it an overall positive score of 92%. Ninety-seven percent of the audience gave the film an A or a B, and it got A's from both the under- and over-25 crowd and A+ among those under 18 years of age and also for the over-50 audience.

Todd McCarthy of The Hollywood Reporter wrote: "Exceptionally beautiful to behold and bolstered by a stellar vocal cast, this umpteenth film rendition of Rudyard Kipling's tales of young Mowgli's adventures amongst the creatures of the Indian jungle proves entirely engaging, even if it's ultimately lacking in subtext and thematic heft". Andrew Barker of Variety felt that this version "can't rival the woolly looseness of Disney's 1967 animated classic, of course, but it succeeds on its own so well that such comparisons are barely necessary". Robbie Collin of The Telegraph gave the film four stars out of five, and deemed it "a sincere and full-hearted adaptation that returns to Kipling for fresh inspiration". Alonso Duralde of TheWrap says: "This 'Book' might lack the post-vaudeville razzamatazz of its predecessor, but director Jon Favreau and a team of effects wizards plunge us into one of the big screen's most engrossing artificial worlds since Avatar". Peter Bradshaw, writing for The Guardian, gave the film four out of five stars and felt that the film had a touch of Apocalypto in it, finding the plot elements to be similar to those in The Lion King. He wrote that the film was "spectacular, exciting, funny and fun" and that it "handsomely revives the spirit of Disney's original film". Pete Hammond of Deadline Hollywood wrote that the film had laughs, excitement, an exceptional voice cast and, most importantly, a lot of heart, calling it a cinematic achievement like no other. He particularly praised Murray's performance and the visual effects, deeming it "simply astonishing". Chris Nashawaty of Entertainment Weekly graded the film an "A−", calling it one of the biggest surprises of 2016. He, however, felt the two songs were rather unnecessary and distracting, and believed the film to be a little too frightening for children.

Richard Roeper of Chicago Sun-Times awarded the film three-and-a-half stars, pointing out the CGI as the apex achievement of the film. He labelled it "a beautifully rendered, visually arresting take on Rudyard Kipling's oft-filmed tales" but found the musical numbers to be trivial, saying that without the musical numbers, the film might have been a more exhilarating streamlined adventure. Los Angeles Times' Kenneth Turan remarked that "The Jungle Book is the kind of family film calculated to make even those without families wish they had one to take along". Peter Travers of Rolling Stone awarded the film three-and-a-half stars out of four, labeling it scary and thrilling, yet unique and unforgettable, and adding that it "fills us with something rare in movies today—a sense of wonder". The Village Voice's Bilge Ebiri hailed the film as fast and light and that it "manages to be just scary enough to make us feel the danger of solitude in the middle of a massive jungle, but never indulgent or gratuitous". Cath Clarke of Time Out compared Elba's character of Shere Khan to Scar from The Lion King, calling him "baddie of the year". Matt Zoller Seitz of RogerEbert.com also had high praise for Elba's portrayal of Shere Khan stating: "His loping menace is envisioned so powerfully that he'd be scary no matter what, but the character becomes a great villain through imaginative empathy. We understand and appreciate his point-of-view, even though carrying it out would mean the death of Mowgli".

The film's visual effects and 3D photography were compared to those of Avatar, Gravity, Hugo, and Life of Pi. Sarah Ward of Screen International wrote that the level of detail on display in the film "is likely to evoke the same jaw-dropping reaction as James Cameron's box office topper". Entertainment Weekly called it "one of the few 3D movies that actually benefit from being in 3D". The film also had a positive reception from Indian contemporary critics and publications, such as The Times of India, The Hindu, India Today, The Indian Express, and The Economic Times.

However, some reviewers criticized the inconsistent tone of the film and the director's indecision to stick to one vision. The New York Times' Manohla Dargis was less enthusiastic. Sam C. Mac of Slant Magazine wrote: "Jon Favreau draws heavily on his film's animated predecessor for plot, characterizations, songs, and set pieces, but doesn't know how to fit these familiar elements into his own coherent vision". Josh Spiegel of Movie Mezzanine also echoed these feelings, saying that the film "stumbles because the people involved aren't willing to fully commit to either making a near-shot-for-shot remake or going in a completely different direction". Rene Rodriguez of the Miami Herald felt that the film was soulless, writing that "the better these talking beasts look, the more the film resembles a gorgeous screen saver. You admire The Jungle Book, but you can't lose yourself in it".

== Future ==
Following the film's financial and critical success, the studio began working on a sequel. Jon Favreau and Justin Marks were in talks to return as director and writer, respectively, while Brigham Taylor was confirmed to be returning as producer. It would potentially have been released sometime in late 2019, and would have been shot back-to-back with Favreau's remake of The Lion King. By March 2017, the sequel had been put on hold so that Favreau could focus on The Lion King. By January 2018, Marks had finished an early draft for the sequel, which he said would "go further through" Rudyard Kipling's material, as well as feature elements of Bill Peet's rejected drafts for the 1967 film. In October 2018, Neel Sethi confirmed that he would reprise his role as Mowgli in the sequel. Since 2018, the project has been on indefinite hold.
