= Lyudmila Ivanova =

Soviet and Russian actress (1933–2016)

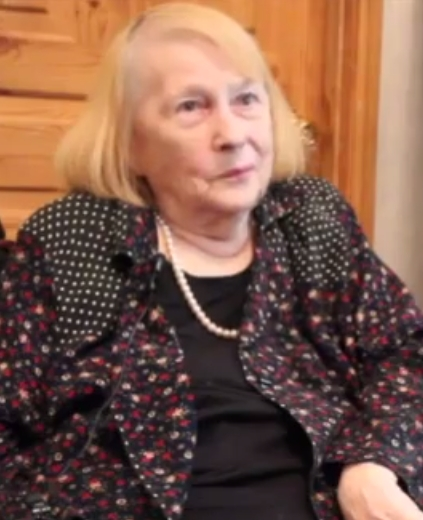
- Lyudmila Ivanovaм in 2014
- Born: Lyudmila Ivanovna Ivanova; 22 June 1933; Moscow, RSFSR, USSR
- Died: 7 October 2016 (aged 83); Moscow, Russia
- Occupation: Actress
- Years active: 1951–2016

Lyudmila Ivanovna Ivanova (Russian: Людмила Ивановна Иванова; 22 June 1933 – 7 October 2016) was a Soviet and Russian film and stage actress, People's Artist of the RSFSR (1989). She was awarded the Order of Honour and the Order of Friendship. She composed many songs for the guitar.

== Biography ==
Ivanova was born on 22 June 1933 in Moscow. She graduated from the Moscow Art Theatre School in 1955 and was accepted into the troupe of the Moscow mobile drama. In 1957, Ivanova entered the Sovremennik Theatre.

Author of many bard songs, she performed in concerts, with Anna German, Sergey Nikitin and Tatyana Nikitina. Artistic director and chief director of the Children's Musical Theater Impromptu. On 18 March 2014 accepted as a member of the Union of Writers of Russia.

On 7 October 2016, Ivanova died at a Moscow hospital, aged 83. The cause of death was not disclosed.

== Filmography ==
- 1958 – Volunteers
- 1963 – Large and Small
- 1965 – Build Bridges
- 1965 – The Sleeping Lion
- 1966 – Nasty Аnecdote
- 1968 – Newcomer
- 1970 – Deniska's Stories
- 1972 – Train Stop — Two Minutes
- 1973 – Looking For a Мan
- 1974 – Remember Your Name
- 1975 – Option Omega
- 1975 – Between Heaven and Earth
- 1976 – Days Surgeon of Mishkin
- 1976 – The Legend of Thiele
- 1977 – Office Romance
- 1977 – Vesnuhin's Fantasy
- 1978 – Vanity of Vanities
- 1980 – Ladies Invite Gentlemen
- 1982 – Flights in Dreams and Reality
- 1983 – Vacation of Petrov and Vasechkin, Usual and Incredible
- 1984 – A Small Favor
- 1984 – Chance
- 1984 – Dr. Aibolit
- 1985 – The Most Charming and Attractive
- 1986 – Plumbum, or The Dangerous Game
- 1987 – The Arrival of the Moon
- 1991 – Spotted Dog Running at the Edge of the Sea
- 1991 – Promised Heaven
- 1992 – New Odeon
- 1993 – American Grandfather
- 1993 – About Businessman Foma
- 1994 – The Master and Margarita
- 1995 – Moscow Нolidays
- 2000 – The Envy of Gods
- 2010 – Moscow, I love you!

== Popular songs ==
- Maybe
- Spring tango
- What is love
- Letter soldier
- Tarusa-gorodok

== Family ==
- Father – Ivan Ivanov (1905-1952), Soviet polar explorer, geographer profession
- Mother – Faina Ivanova (1908-1969)
- Husband – Valery Milyaev (1937-2011), singer, writer, teacher, doctor of physical and mathematical sciences.
- Two sons: Ivan Milyaev, Honored Artist of Russia
  Alexander (1970-2010)

== Awards ==
- Order of Honor (6 June 2001) – for many years of fruitful activity in the field of art and culture, and a great contribution to strengthening friendship and cooperation between nations
- Order of Friendship (21 April 2009) – for her work in the development of national culture and art, and many years of fruitful activity
