= USS Bagheera =

Patrol vessel of the United States Navy

History

United States
- Name: USS Bagheera
- Namesake: Previous name retained; Bagheera was the leopard or panther in Rudyard Kipling's The Jungle Book
- Builder: Hodgdon Brothers, Boothbay, Maine
- Completed: 1907
- Acquired: 22 June 1917
- Commissioned: 24 June 1917
- Stricken: 5 February 1919
- Fate: Returned to owner 5 February 1919
- Notes: Operated as private schooner Bagheera 1907-1917 and from 1919

General characteristics
- Type: Section patrol vessel
- Tonnage: 30 Gross register tons
- Length: 66 ft 0 in (20.12 m)
- Beam: 10 ft 6 in (3.20 m)
- Draft: 6 ft 6 in (1.98 m) mean
- Installed power: 1 Mianus 2 cyl. gasoline engine rated at 20 horsepower
- Propulsion: Sails plus engine
- Sail plan: Schooner-rigged
- Speed: 5.2 knots (6.0 mph; 9.6 km/h) (under power)
- Complement: 9
- Armament: 2 × 1-pounder guns

USS Bagheera (SP-963) was a United States Navy auxiliary schooner that served as a patrol vessel. She was in commission from 1917 to 1919.

Bagheera was built in 1907 as the private schooner Bagheera, official number 204239, by Hodgdon Brothers at Boothbay, Maine. The two masted schooner with a sail area of 2,354 square feet had an auxiliary Mianus 2 cylinder gasoline engine rated at 20 horsepower. The rated endurance of the schooner was 435 nautical miles (501 mi; 806 km) nautical miles with a fuel capacity of 190 gallons and cruising speed of 5.2 knots (6.0 mph; 9.6 km/h). The 1914 Lloyd's Register of American Yachts showed the yacht's owner as E. W. Atkinson with Boston, Massachusetts as home port.

On 22 June 1917, the U.S. Navy acquired her under a free lease from her owner, J. W. Hendrick of Chicago, Illinois, for use as a section patrol boat during World War I. She was commissioned on 24 June 1917 as USS Bagheera (SP-963). Assigned to the 5th Naval District, Bagheera served on patrol duties through the end of World War I.

Bagheera was decommissioned at Norfolk, Virginia, after the war. She was stricken from the Naval Vessel Register on 5 February 1919 and returned to Hendrick the same day.
