= Brigham Taylor =

Film producer

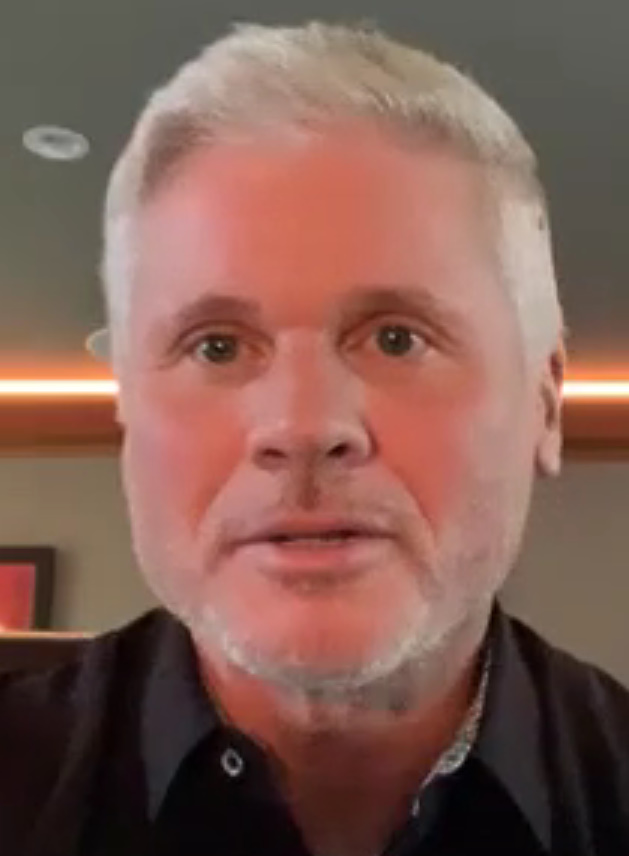
- Taylor in 2023
- Born: 1967 (age 58–59); Palo Alto, California, U.S.
- Occupation: Producer
- Years active: 1994–present

Brigham Taylor (born 1967) is a film producer for Walt Disney Pictures. He has worked for Disney since 1994, and became a producer for the company in 2014. He co-produced the live-action films The Jungle Book and Christopher Robin.

== Life and career ==
Brigham Taylor started his career as a volunteer at the Sundance Film Festival and the Filmmakers Lab, from which he observed filmmakers work. In 1994, Taylor became a production executive for Walt Disney Pictures, a position from which he oversaw live-action films from the company such as the Pirates of the Caribbean franchise, with Taylor involving producer Jerry Bruckheimer and director Gore Verbinski into the first film. In 2003, he pitched to Disney a film titled Christopher Robin, which is based on Winnie the Pooh and focusing on a grown-up Christopher Robin reuniting with Pooh. However, since Disney was developing other Pooh projects at the time, the project wasn't green-lighted for a film.

On August 4, 2014, Taylor was promoted from production executive to producer, working exclusively for Disney's live-action projects. From his new position, Tayor acted as an executive producer on the 2015 film Tomorrowland. He also acted as a co-producer on Disney's The Jungle Book, a remake of Walt Disney's 1967 animated film of the same name, itself based on Rudyard Kipling's eponymous works. As a kid, Taylor was a fan of the original film, and thus, he and director/co-producer Jon Favreau aimed to balance Kipling's original works with the 1967 film. The film was met with universal acclaim, with Taylor and Favreau earning a Feature Film nomination at the British Academy Children's Awards. In 2017, Taylor executive-produced Pirates of the Caribbean: Dead Men Tell No Tales, the fifth entry in the Pirates of the Caribbean franchise. In 2018, Taylor produced Disney's Christopher Robin. Taylor was convinced to resurrect the project some time after becoming a producer by co-producer Kristin Burr.

Taylor produced the live-action remake of Lady and the Tramp, which was one of the first films to be released on Disney's streaming service, Disney+. Taylor is set to produce a live-action adaptation of The Sword in the Stone, which will also be released on Disney+, as well as a sequel to The Jungle Book. Taylor will also co-produce a sequel to The Rocketeer. He was originally set to produce a remake of The Haunted Mansion, alongside Guillermo del Toro, but the two left the project by August 2020.

As of 2016, Taylor heads his own production company, "TaylorMade Productions", also known as "Taylor Made". The company helped produce The Jungle Book and Christopher Robin, and co-produced Lady and the Tramp.

April 17, 2026, Taylor announced a new film & television production company, partnering with independent producer, Dave Hunter, formerly of Sony Pictures Classics executive, former Epix business affairs executive, Ian Puente, and independent producer, TomGoodall. The company will be Utah-based, named InTension Industries, and focus on thrillers and genre projects. Their first two projects include a sci-fi thriller starring Steve Zahn and a South American adventure thriller (entitled Rio Diablo) with Esteban Arango directing and Matt Graham executive producing.

== Filmography ==
Year	Title	Producer	Executive Producer	Notes
2015	Tomorrowland	No	Yes	with John Walker, Bernard Bellew and Jeff Jensen
2016	The Jungle Book	Yes	No	with Jon Favreau
2017	Pirates of the Caribbean: Dead Men Tell No Tales	No	Yes	with Mike Stenson, Chad Oman, Joe Caracciolo, Jr. and Terry Rossio
2018	Christopher Robin	Yes	No	with Kristin Burr
2019	Lady and the Tramp	Yes	No	
2020	The One and Only Ivan	Yes	No	with Angelina Jolie and Allison Shearmur
2023	Tokyo Cowboy	Yes	No	with Arata Iura
TBA	The Return of the Rocketeer	Yes	No	with David Oyelowo and Jessica Oyelowo

== Awards and nominations ==
Year	Award	Category	Recipient(s)	Result	Ref(s)
2016	British Academy Children's Awards	Feature Film	The Jungle Book	Nominated	
