= Remember Your Name =

- Directed by: Sergey Kolosov
- Written by: Sergey Kolosov; Ernest Bryll; Janusz Krasiński
- Produced by: Fabian Mogilevsky; Stanislav Zhilevich
- Starring: Lyudmila Kasatkina; Lyudmila Ivanova; Tadeusz Borowski
- Cinematography: Boguslaw Lambach
- Edited by: Galina Spirina; Janina Vishnevska
- Music by: Andrzej Kozhinski
- Production companies: Mosfilm; Iluzjon
- Release date: 1974
- Running time: 75 min.
- Country: Soviet Union
- Language: Russian

Remember Your Name (Russian: По́мни и́мя своё; Polish: Zapamiętaj imię swoje) is a Soviet-Polish film by Sergey Kolosov.

The film is based on the story of the Russian prisoner of Auschwitz Zinaida Georgievna Muravyova, who was separated there from her son Gennady. She found him only years later, when he lived in Poland under the name of Eugeniusz Gruszczynski (after the war he was taken to an orphanage in Lower Silesia, where he was adopted by Polish educator Elena Grushinska) and was a student of the Szczecin polytechnic. In 1969 in Poland, about Grushinsky was released half-hour TV movie Numer 149850. It could also be inspired by a ten-minute documentary, Children of the Rams (Dzieci rampy, 1963), directed by Andrzej Piekutowski, showing among the survivors of Auschwitz a girl who found, several years after the war, her real parents in the Soviet Union.

== Plot ==
“On the day of Germany's attack on the USSR, Zina Vorobyova, a resident of Belorussia, gives birth to a son, Gena.” After a while they get to Auschwitz, where after quarantine they are resettled in different barracks, but Zina, as far as possible, always visits Gene and feeds him. Toward the end of the war, because of the Soviet offensive, Zina falls into the Marsh of Death, and when she leaves, she is horrified to see that the barrack in which her son is located is boarded up - the children are clearly going to kill. Then, after the war, during the return, Zina finds out from her husband's friend who happened to meet on unexpected occasions that he died on the very first day of the war, and from shock he loses sight. She struggles to recover, settles in Leningrad, where she then starts working in a quality laboratory at a TV production plant, but does not give up trying to find Gena, because she is sure that he is alive. She constantly sends inquiries to Poland to the Auschwitz Museum, when she learns that this organization actively helps in search of the missing children of the former prisoners of the camp. Once she sees on TV newsreels about Auschwitz, shot by Soviet soldiers after liberation, and finds out in the crowd of liberated children to Gena.

In parallel, it is shown that Gena is really alive. After the war, he and other unclaimed children find themselves in an improvised shelter, where the former prisoner of Auschwitz, the Polish Halina Truschinska, is interested in him. Gena by that time no longer speaks Russian, but only in Polish and German, and thinks he is French (his name is Gene, he is rewriting to the Polish Genak). After some time, Galina adopts the Gen, and now his name is Eugeniusz Trushchinsky. Years pass, and the grown Eugeniusz becomes a sea captain. One day he and his girlfriend come to the Auschwitz Museum for an excursion and experience a shock when, while watching the same newsreel that Zina saw, she sees herself in the frame. The director of the museum invites him to his room and, upon learning his number, informs him about Zina's request. Despite internal contradictions, Eugeniusz comes to Leningrad and reunites with his own mother, but after a while leaves, because in Poland he now has his own life.

== Cast ==
- Lyudmila Kasatkina as Zinaida Grigorievna Vorobyova
- Lyudmila Ivanova as Nadezhda
- Tadeusz Borowski as Eugeniusz Trushinsky (Gena Vorobyov)
- Ryszarda Hanin as Halina Trushinska
- Vladimir Ivashov as major
- Leon Niemczyk as Piotrovsky
- Lyubov Sokolova as postman
- Valentina Telegina as nurse in hospital

== Awards ==
- Polish Film Festival — Best Actress (Lyudmila Kasatkina)
- All-Union Film Festival — Grand Prix
