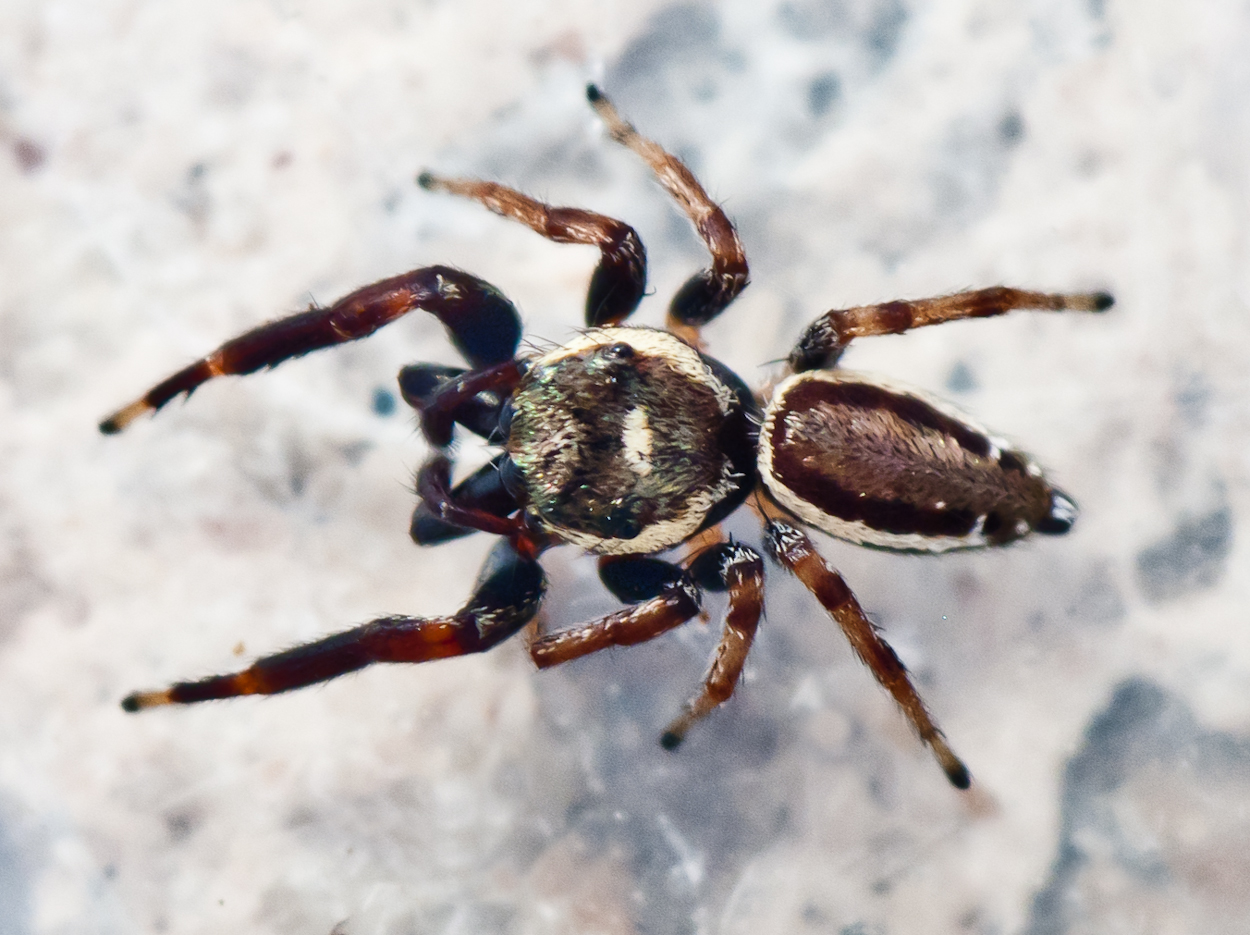
- Male in Mexico
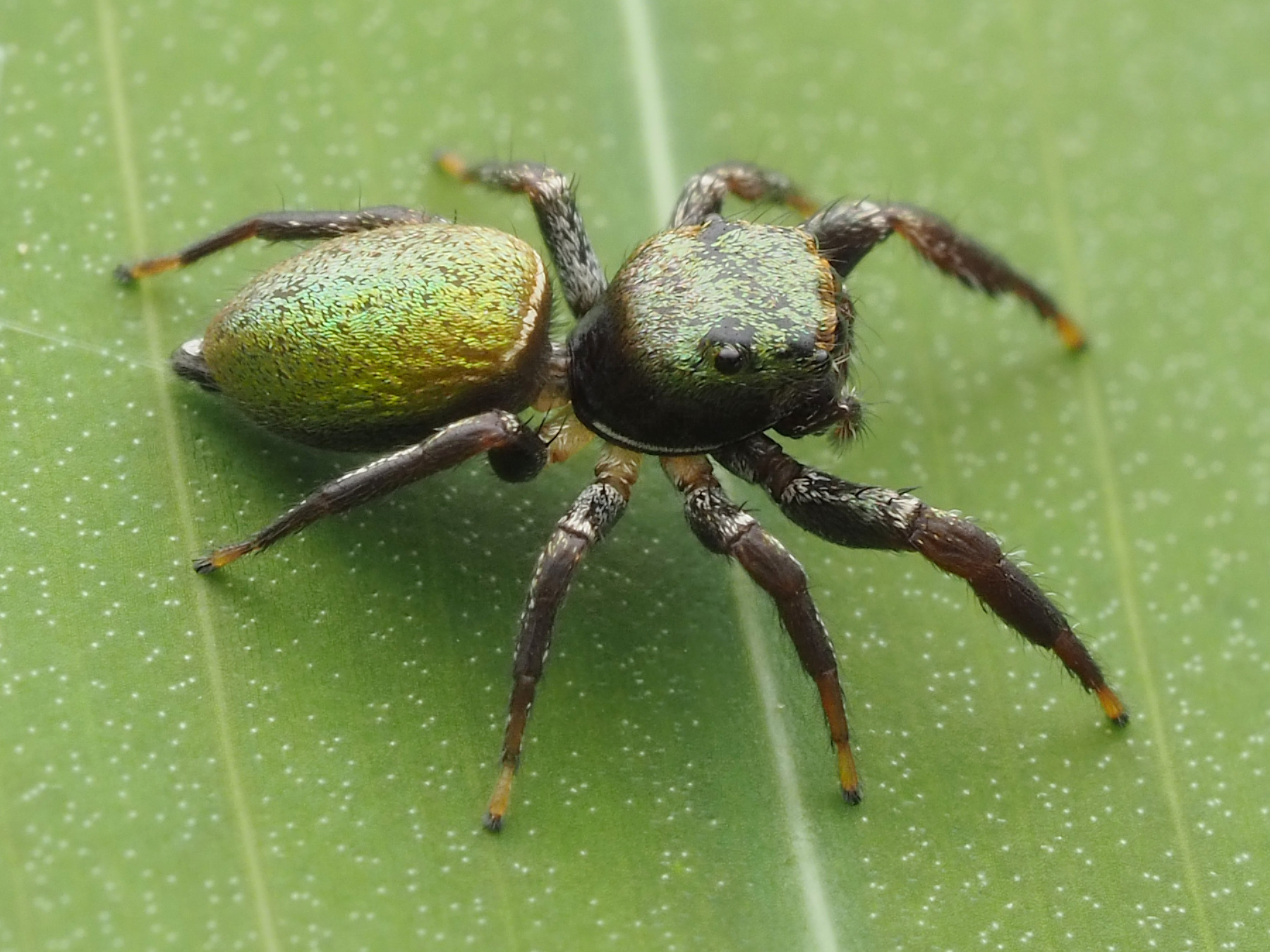
- Female in Belize

Scientific classification
- Kingdom: Animalia
- Phylum: Arthropoda
- Subphylum: Chelicerata
- Class: Arachnida
- Order: Araneae
- Infraorder: Araneomorphae
- Family: Salticidae
- Genus: Messua
- Species: M. limbata

Binomial name
- Messua limbata (Banks, 1898)

= Messua limbata =

Species of spider

Messua limbata is a species of jumping spider in the family Salticidae. It is found in the southern United States and Mexico.
