= Mother Mary (1983 film) =

- Directed by: Sergey Kolosov
- Written by: Sergey Kolosov; Yelena Mikulina
- Starring: Lyudmila Kasatkina; Leonid Markov
- Cinematography: Valentin Zheleznyakov
- Music by: Alexey Rybnikov
- Release date: 1983
- Country: Soviet Union
- Language: Russian

Mother Mary (Russian: Мать Мария, romanized: Mat' Mariya) is a 1983 Soviet biopic written and directed by Sergey Kolosov and starring Lyudmila Kasatkina. It is loosely based on real life events of poet Maria Skobtsova. It was entered into the main competition at the 40th edition of the Venice Film Festival.

== Plot ==
The film tells the story of a bright and tragic fate of the Russian poet Elizaveta Yurevna Kuzmina-Karavayeva, in 1920 she emigrated to France and became a nun under the name of Mary. The shelter-based support it found many disadvantaged Soviet emigres. During the Second World War, Maria has become one of the heroines of the French Resistance.

== Cast ==
- Lyudmila Kasatkina as Elizaveta Yurievna Kuzmina-Karavayeva
- Leonid Markov as Daniel Skobtsov
- Igor Gorbachyov as Bunakov-Fondaminsky
- Veronika Polonskaya as Sofia Pylenko
- Yevgeniya Khanayeva as Madame Langeais
- Vaclav Dvorzhetsky as Nicolaevsky
- Alexander Timoshkin as Jura
- Natalya Bondarchuk as Nina
- Alexander Lebedev as Anatoly
