= A dzsungel könyve =

- Music: László Dés
- Lyrics: Péter Geszti
- Book: Pál Békés
- Basis: The Jungle Book by Rudyard Kipling
- Premiere: January 28, 1996: Pesti Színház, Budapest
- Awards: 1996 Hungarian Theatre Critics Award for Best Musical

A dzsungel könyve (Hungarian: [ɒ ˈd͡ʒuŋɡɛl ˈkøɲvɛ]; English: The Jungle Book) is a Hungarian musical based on The Jungle Book. With music by László Dés, lyrics by Péter Geszti, and book by Pál Békés, it premiered on January 28, 1996 in Pesti Színház with the company of the Comedy Theatre of Budapest directed by Géza Hegedűs D. The musical won the Hungarian Theatre Award for Best Musical in that year. The original production reached its thousandth performance in 2013, and it has been produced in several Hungarian theatres.

== List of musical numbers ==
Act 1

- "Nyitány" – company
- "Farkas vagyok" – Akela, little Mowgli & company
- "Beindul a pofonofon" – Baloo, Mowgli & Bagheera
- "Egy majomban őrlünk" – monkeys
- "Válj kővé!" – Kaa
- "Mit ér a farkas?" – Akela
- "Száz a kérdés" – Shere Khan
- "Amíg őriz a szemed" – Baloo & Mowgli
- "Csak egy út van" – Mowgli

Act 2

- "Vadászok dala" – men
- "Szavakat keresek" – Toona & Mowgli
- "A mi emberünk" – women
- "A tigris éjszakája" – Kaa & Bagheera
- "Kegyelet egylet" – Chil
- "Beszél a szél" – Bagheera
- "Finálé" – Toona, Mowgli & company

The Act 1 finale song ("Csak egy út van") was added after the 1000th performance.

== Productions ==
Role	Original cast
Mowgli	Krisztián Dányi
Akela	Ferenc Borbiczki
Bagheera	Erzsébet Kútvölgyi
Baloo	Gábor Reviczky
Shere Khan	Tibor Szervét
Kaa	László Méhes
Chil	András Sipos
Cobra	Endre Harkányi
Buldeo	Pál Oberfrank
Toona	Réka Juhász
Little Mowgli	Fanni Dés
