= Nagaina =

Scientific classification
- Kingdom: Animalia
- Phylum: Arthropoda
- Subphylum: Chelicerata
- Class: Arachnida
- Order: Araneae
- Infraorder: Araneomorphae
- Family: Salticidae
- Subfamily: Salticinae
- Genus: Nagaina; Peckham & Peckham, 1896

Type species
- N. incunda Peckham & Peckham, 1896

Species
- 5, see text

Genus of spiders

Nagaina is a genus of jumping spiders that was first described by George and Elizabeth Peckham in 1896. The name is derived from Nagaina, a character from Rudyard Kipling's Rikki-Tikki-Tavi. Other salticid genera with names of Kipling's characters include Bagheera, Messua, and Akela.

== Species ==
As of July 2019 it contains five species, found in Panama, Mexico, Brazil, and on the Greater Antilles:

- Nagaina berlandi Soares & Camargo, 1948 – Brazil
- Nagaina diademata Simon, 1902 – Brazil
- Nagaina incunda Peckham & Peckham, 1896 (type) – Mexico to Panama
- Nagaina olivacea Franganillo, 1930 – Cuba
- Nagaina tricincta Simon, 1902 – Brazil
