= Lyudmila Kasatkina =

Soviet and Russian actress

- Людмила Касаткина
- Kasatkina in 2010
- Born: Lyudmila Ivanovna Kasatkina; 15 May 1925; Smolensk Governorate, RSFSR, Soviet Union
- Died: 22 February 2012 (aged 86); Moscow, Russia
- Occupation: Actress
- Spouse: Sergey Kolosov

Lyudmila Ivanovna Kasatkina (Russian: Людмила Ивановна Касаткина; 15 May 1925 – 22 February 2012) was a Soviet and Russian actress who starred in a string of war-related films directed by her husband Sergey Kolosov.

== Biography ==
Kasatkina was born in a village near Vyazemsky Uyezd, Smolensk Oblast, and attended a ballet school. After breaking her leg at age 14, she gave up her dream of dancing and joined the Russian Institute of Theatre Arts. Kasatkina joined the troupe of the Red Army Theatre in 1947 and worked there for the rest of her life. Her breakthrough film role was a tiger tamer in Tamer of Tigers (1955) where she was body/stunt doubled by Margarita Nazarova, a professionally trained tiger handler. She appeared in such film adaptations as The Taming of the Shrew (1961) and The Darling (1966, after Chekhov).

Kasatkina was named a People's Artist of the USSR in 1975 and was awarded the Order "For Merit to the Fatherland" 2 class in 2010. She died in Moscow eleven days after the death of her husband, Sergey Kolosov. The couple were buried in the Novodevichy Cemetery.

== Selected filmography ==
- Tamer of Tigers (Укротительница тигров, 1955) as Lena Vorontsova
- Honeymoon (Медовый месяц, 1956) as Lyuda Odintsova
- Adventures of Mowgli (Маугли, 1967–71) as Bagheera (voice)
- Big School-Break (Большая перемена, 1972) as The School Director
- Remember Your Name (Помни имя своё, 1974) as Zinaida Grigorievna Vorobyova
- The Circus Princess (Принцесса цирка, 1982) as Madame Caroline
- Mother Mary (Мать Мария, 1982) as Maria Skobtsova
- Poisons or the World History of Poisoning (Яды, или Всемирная история отравлений, 2001) as Eugenia Ivanovna Kholodkova
