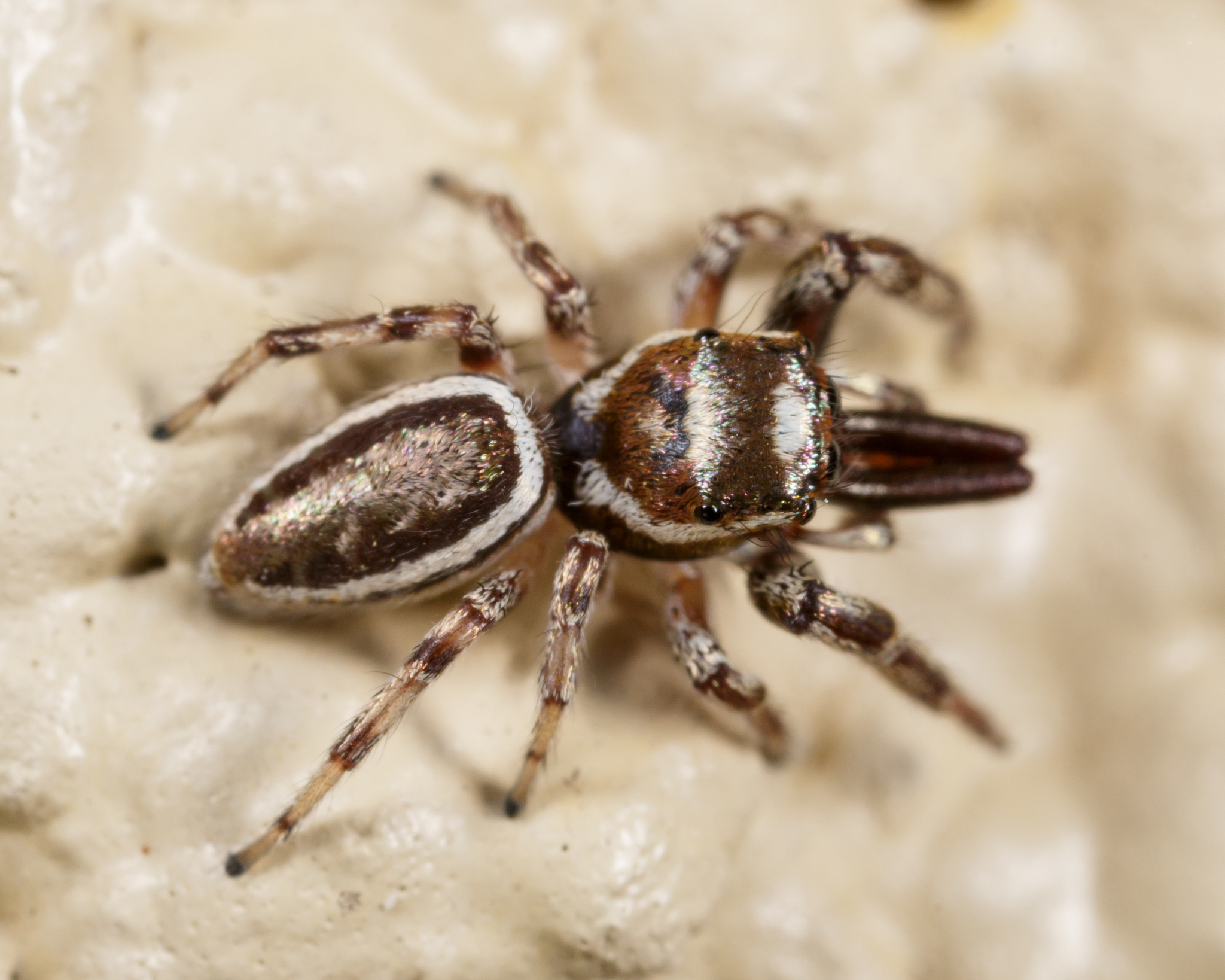

Scientific classification
- Kingdom: Animalia
- Phylum: Arthropoda
- Subphylum: Chelicerata
- Class: Arachnida
- Order: Araneae
- Infraorder: Araneomorphae
- Family: Salticidae
- Genus: Bagheera
- Species: B. prosper

Binomial name
- Bagheera prosper Peckham & Peckham, 1901

= Bagheera prosper =

Species of spider

Bagheera prosper is a species of jumping spiders of the family Salticidae found in the U.S. and Mexico. The species was described by Peckham & Peckham in 1901. The male has long, parallel chelicerae and large spiral embolus on the prolateral side of the palpal bulb, while the female has regular sized chelicerae and the epigynal openings in spiral atria. It is found in Northern Mexico, as well as Texas, Oklahoma, and western Arkansas. It is most often seen during March or April. It is mostly brown, but may also have black, tan, grey or white on its body. This spider is hard to find because of its coloring, as it blends in well with its habitat, however it is fairly common. It prefers warmer habitats.

== Markings ==
The spider is mostly brown or dark brown, with a set of distinctive markings on its abdomen. These markings consist of a series of triangle-shaped black spots in two lines running down its abdomen. Rarely, a spider can be born with two thick black lines instead of triangular markings. The purpose of these markings is unknown.
