= Bagheera =

Character from The Jungle Book

- The Jungle Book character
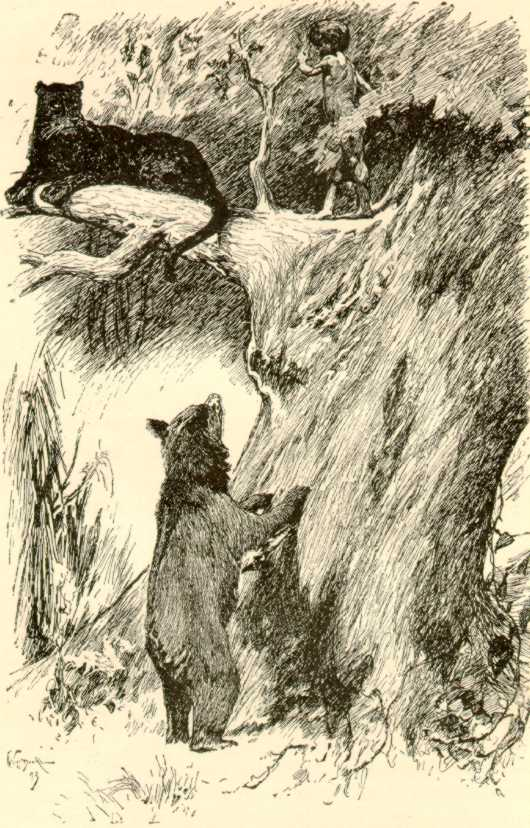
- Bagheera (on the tree) with Mowgli and Baloo (Lockwood Kipling art)
- First appearance: "Mowgli's Brothers"
- Last appearance: "The Spring Running"
- Created by: Rudyard Kipling

In-universe information
- Gender: Male
- Relatives: Yusaf (ex-owner), Ameena (friend) and Ghargisht

Bagheera (Hindi: बघीरा / Baghīrā) is a fictional character in Rudyard Kipling's Mowgli stories in The Jungle Book (coll. 1894) and The Second Jungle Book (coll. 1895). He is a black panther (melanistic Indian leopard) who serves as friend, protector and mentor to the "man-cub" Mowgli. The word bagheera is Hindi for panther or leopard, although the root word bagh means any form of Panthera and is nowadays mostly used to refer to the Royal Bengal tiger.

== Character history ==
Born in captivity in the menagerie of the Raja of Udaipur, Rajasthan, India, Bagheera begins to plan for his freedom after his mother dies. Once he is mature and strong enough, he breaks the lock on his cage and escapes into the jungle, where his cunning nature wins him the respect of all its other inhabitants, except for Shere Khan the Tiger. Bagheera reveals all this to Mowgli later. None but Mowgli ever learn that Bagheera once wore a collar and chain, explaining the cat's special insight concerning men. Because he had learned the ways of men, he was also more loving to the abandoned human child who came to be under his care and protection.

When Father Wolf and Mother Wolf of the Seeonee (Seoni) wolf pack adopt the human "cub" Mowgli and the pack demands that the new cub should be spoken for, Bagheera buys Mowgli's life with a freshly killed bull and helps to raise him as one of the pack. Because his life has been bought by a bull, Mowgli is forbidden to eat cattle (coincidentally, just as the Hindu villagers of the region are also forbidden). Bagheera will frequently remind Mowgli of this debt by swearing an oath referencing his own previous captivity. As Bagheera swears, "By the broken lock that freed me", so Mowgli answers back "By the bull that bought me."

At one point, during one of Mowgli's many lessons in the Laws of the Jungle under the tutelage of Baloo the Bear, Bagheera says "I am more likely to give help than to ask it", as Mowgli learns the many sacred words needed to call on the assistance of all kinds of species of animals living in the jungle. Bagheera, having freed himself from the captivity of humans, is a proud animal aware of his own abilities, though he acknowledges Mowgli's growing power over each of the animals as the boy grows older. Bagheera shows Mowgli that none of the animals may stare into his eyes, even those who love him.

Bagheera shares in many of Mowgli's adventures as he grows, but eventually the time comes when the man-cub becomes a man and has to return to human society. Bagheera frees Mowgli of his debt to the wolf pack by killing another bull, and Mowgli returns to his adopted human mother Messua.

Bagheera is one of Mowgli's mentors and best friends. He, Baloo and Kaa sing for Mowgli "The Outsong" of the jungle. He also calls out to Mowgli in farewell, "Remember, Bagheera loved thee... Remember, Bagheera loved thee."

== Disney adaptations ==
Bagheera
- First appearance: The Jungle Book (1967)
- Created by: Rudyard Kipling; Walt Disney

=== 1967 animated film ===
Bagheera appears in the 1967 animated adaptation by Walt Disney Productions. His voice is provided by Sebastian Cabot. Early in the film's development, Bill Peet suggested Howard Morris as the voice of Bagheera, but Disney did not approve of the choice, with Reitherman and other animators preferring either Karl Swenson or Sebastian Cabot. Cabot was the final choice.

As in the Kipling books, Bagheera is Mowgli's rational guardian; however, while developing the film, Walt Disney chose to omit Bagheera's past and scars and not let him spoil Mowgli more. Baloo in the film often calls Bagheera "Baggy" as a nickname.

Bagheera finds Mowgli as a baby and brings him to a pack of wolves to ensure his survival, knowing Mowgli will eventually need to return to the human world. When Shere Khan returns to the jungle, Bagheera offers to take Mowgli to a nearby human village for his safety. Bagheera conflicts with Baloo regarding Mowgli, but Bagheera reminds him of Shere Khan and convinces him to help him. When Mowgli runs away from Baloo, Bagheera tries to gain help from Hathi and his herd of elephants in finding him. Bagheera consoles Mowgli when he thinks Shere Khan has killed Baloo trying to defend him, but Baloo wakes much to Bagheera's anger, having thought him dead. When Mowgli follows Shanti a human girl into the village, Bagheera encourages him and consoles Baloo, assuring him of Mowgli's safety. He and Baloo walk off afterward singing "The Bare Necessities" as the film ends.

Though Bagheera is absent from the series TaleSpin, which uses several characters from the 1967 film, many of Shere Khan's employees and military personnel are black panthers strongly resembling him.

Bagheera appears as a cub in the prequel series Jungle Cubs, where his friends often make fun of him. Like Shere Khan and Hathi, Bagheera has an American accent as opposed to his English accent in the 1967 film. Bagheera is voiced in Jungle Cubs by E.G. Daily and Dee Bradley Baker as a cub and by Jim Cummings as an adult on special animated segments.

Bagheera appears in The Jungle Book 2, voiced by Bob Joles. When Shere Khan returns to take revenge on Mowgli, Bagheera tries to stop Baloo from visiting Mowgli, suspecting he wants to bring him back to the jungle. Bagheera fails despite gaining the aid of Hathi and Baloo tricks him into thinking Mowgli is not with him, though Bagheera is unsure. Bagheera rushes to help Mowgli and his friend Shanti after Shere Khan attacks them but has to wait outside the temple where they are trapped, warning Baloo to be careful as he travels inside. Mowgli manages to trap Shere Khan, after which he introduces Shanti to Bagheera. At the end of the film, he is shown playing with Mowgli's adoptive brother Ranjan. Joles became the current voice of the character since 2000.

=== 1994 live-action film ===
In the 1994 live-action film, Bagheera is portrayed by a black leopard named Shadow. As opposed to other adaptations, Bagheera and the other animals in this film do not speak.

Bagheera finds Mowgli and his pet wolf, Grey Brother, after they are separated from civilization. Hearing Shere Khan's roar, Bagheera leads them by his tail to a pack of wolves, who adopt them as Mowgli is kind to one of their species. When Mowgli is an adult and has learned the ways of men, he introduces Bagheera to his love interest Kitty Brydon, though he is hostile toward Kitty's fiancé Captain Boone and his soldiers. Bagheera saves Mowgli from being shot by soldiers working for Boone, and later saves their friend Dr. Plumford from being killed by Buldeo and a caravan of bandits. When Mowgli is tied to a tree, Bagheera arrives and chews through the ropes, freeing him. At the end of the film Bagheera is seen crossing a bridge with a triumphant Mowgli and Kitty.

=== 1998 live-action film ===
Bagheera appears in 1998 live-action film The Jungle Book: Mowgli's Story, voiced by Eartha Kitt. This incarnation is female, but her role is similar to the 1967 animated version, in addition serving as Mowgli's teacher (alongside Baloo) in which she teaches him how to hunt in the jungle and defend against Shere Khan.

=== 2016 live-action/CGI hybrid film ===
Bagheera appears in the 2016 remake of the 1967 film as a computer-generated character, where he is voiced by Ben Kingsley. Bagheera's role is largely similar to the 1967 animated version, serving as a mentor to Mowgli and a voice of reason to him and Baloo.

Bagheera rescues Mowgli after Shere Khan kills the boy's father and raises him to be a creature of the jungle as part of Akela's wolf pack. When Shere Khan threatens Mowgli's life, Bagheera agrees to guide him to a human village, but Shere Khan ambushes them en route. Bagheera fights Shere Khan, buying Mowgli enough time to escape. He reunites with Mowgli after Baloo saves him from Kaa, and tries to have Baloo lie to Mowgli in order to ensure he stays in the village. Bagheera and Baloo help Mowgli escape King Louie and his gang of monkeys, but Mowgli is furious with them for failing to tell them Shere Khan has killed Akela. Bagheera helps Baloo and the wolf pack fight Shere Khan long enough to allow Mowgli to lure the tiger over a pit of fire, into which he falls to his death. Bagheera is seen sitting with Baloo and Mowgli as the film ends, Mowgli having found his true home in the jungle.

Kingsley described Bagheera in an interview as an adoptive parent to Mowgli whose personality was somewhat militaristic, saying that "he's instantly recognizable by the way that he talks, how he acts, and what his ethical code is". Kingsley's voice acting was praised by Rotten Tomatoes as "[bringing] the appropriate level of gravitas to the strait-laced Bagheera", and was ranked as the best animal performance in the film by Vox, who called Bagheera "the concerned parent, worried about what his child will find around the next corner, the big cat who knows he has to let go just a little but can't find it in himself to do so".

== Other media ==
- In the 1967 animated Soviet film, Adventures of Mowgli, Bagheera (Russian: Багира) is portrayed as female. This may be related to the fact that the Russian word for "panther" (Russian: пантера, pantera) is a feminine noun. As a matter of fact, Russian translators sometimes accidentally sought gender balance by changing the gender and name of fictional animals if they were behaving similar to local folklore trickster, e. g. there's a female fox character in an adaptation/translation of Italian The Adventures of Pinocchio made by A. Tolstoy). Additionally, in the Russian translation of the book, Bagheera is female. In this version, she has three cubs, one black and two yellow with rosette patterns. Bagheera is portrayed as friendly, loyal, trustworthy, and protective, yet somewhat cunning and tricky. She is voiced by Lyudmila Kasatkina in the original Soviet Russian-language version, and by Dana Delany in the 1996 American English version.
- In a 1978 live-action sketch titled The Wonderful World of Ernie from Morecambe and Wise, which parodied "I Wan'na Be Like You (The Monkey Song)", Bagheera is played by Derek Griffiths using a full costume, although lip-synching to Sebastian Cabot's original recorded dialogue in the middle of the song.
- In the Japanese anime Jungle Book Shōnen Mowgli, Bagheera is one of Mowgli's closest friends and strongest allies. He is voiced by Hiroya Ishimaru in the Japanese and Arthur Grosser in the English dub. Like in the literature, he was formerly a pet panther, but instead of breaking free on his own, he is set free on purpose, mainly to protect him as his owner was a cruel man, though the man's daughter Linda was compassionate to him and even went as far as taking a gunshot for him to ensure his escape. Bagheera later told Mowgli about her and also mourns her.
- In the 1991 song "Bagheera" by Blues Traveler, Bagheera is depicted with blood-stained fur drinking at the bar, counseling a young man-cub about his choice to live as man or as a free creature. Mowgli remembers when he was in the midst of his decision to live with the world of Man or to return to the jungle and be free. The line says "some say if you could have seen him then, you would have noticed a tear fall from his majestic eye".
- In the 1996 Hungarian play version, Bagheera is again a female panther. Her main role is bribing the wolf pack with a bull, so they accept Mowgli as Akela's cub, teaching Mowgli with Baloo about the Rules of the Jungle, and advising him throughout the play.
- In the 2002 comic book series Fables, Bagheera appears as one of the characters living in exile on the Farm in upstate New York. He participates in the farm uprising and, along with the other "Kipling" fables, he assists Goldilocks in tracking down Reynard the Fox. Bagheera actually succeeds in tracking down Reynard, though the Fox manages to escape from him. It is implied that Bagheera's primary motivation for capturing the Fox is to show up Shere Khan after Khan arrogantly rejects Bagheera's offer of help. After the uprising is defeated, a remorseful Bagheera agrees to imprisonment rather than forced labor. However, as he reveals to Mowgli, he has the memory of urinating on the deceased Shere Khan's grave to amuse himself.
- A 2007 Swedish play version of The Jungle Book spoofed the confusion of Bagheera's sex in the media by portraying him as a transvestite.
- In the 2018 film Mowgli: Legend of the Jungle, Christian Bale voiced Bagheera.
- In the 2024 Indian superhero film Bagheera, the film's protagonist takes his name from the Jungle Book character.

== See also ==
- Bagheera kiplingi
- USS Bagheera (SP-963)

== Sources ==
- Deja, Andreas (2022). Walt Disney's The Jungle Book: Making a Masterpiece. Weldon Owen. ISBN 978-1-6818-8893-4.
- Peet, Bill (1989). Bill Peet: An Autobiography. Houghton Mifflin Harcourt. ISBN 978-0-3956-8982-0.
