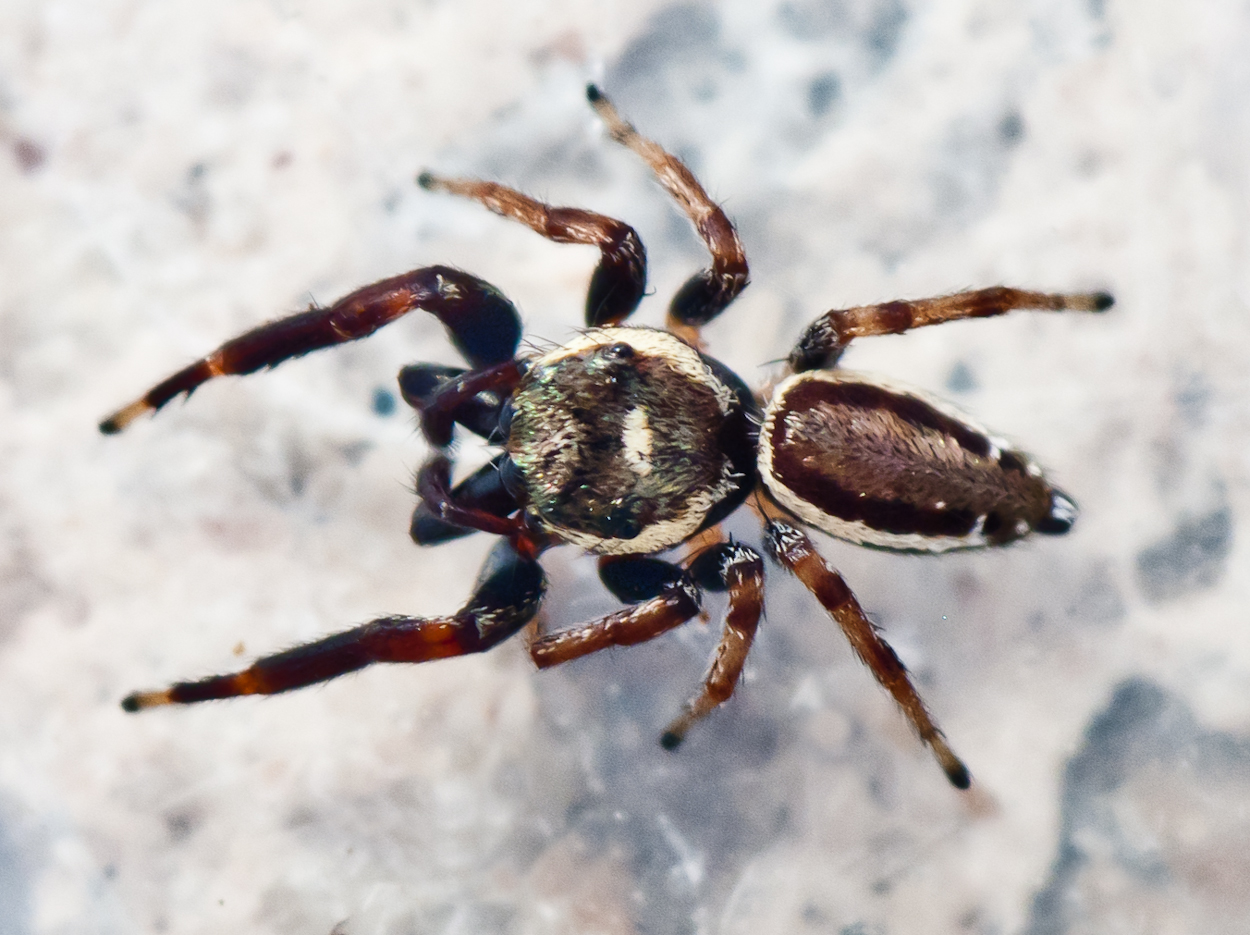
- Male Messua limbata

Scientific classification
- Kingdom: Animalia
- Phylum: Arthropoda
- Subphylum: Chelicerata
- Class: Arachnida
- Order: Araneae
- Infraorder: Araneomorphae
- Family: Salticidae
- Subfamily: Salticinae
- Genus: Messua; Peckham & Peckham, 1896

Type species
- Messua desidiosa Peckham & Peckham, 1896

Species
- See text

= Messua (spider) =

Genus of spiders

Messua is a spider genus of the family Salticidae (jumping spiders).

== Etymology ==
The genus name is derived from Messua, a female character from Rudyard Kipling's Jungle Book. Other salticid genera with names of Kipling's characters are Akela, Bagheera and Nagaina.

== Taxonomy ==
The genus was first described in 1896 by American arachnologists George and Elizabeth Peckham based on the type species Messua desidiosa.

The genus Messua was synonymized with Zygoballus by Eugène Simon in 1903. After examining the type specimen for Messua desidiosa, Simon commented that it was "much less divergent from typical Zygoballus than [the Peckhams'] description would indicate." This was reversed by Wayne Maddison in 1996, and Messua restored as a valid genus. Maddison also transferred several species that had previously been placed in Metaphidippus into Messua.

== Species ==
As of 2026, the World Spider Catalog accepted the following species:

- Messua avicennia Edwards & Baert, 2018 – Galápagos Islands
- Messua centralis (Peckham & Peckham, 1896) – Panama
- Messua dentigera (F. O. P-Cambridge, 1901) – Guatemala to Panama
- Messua desidiosa Peckham & Peckham, 1896 – Costa Rica, Panama
- Messua donalda (Kraus, 1955) – El Salvador
- Messua felix (Peckham & Peckham, 1901) – United States (including Hawaii), Mexico
- Messua lata (Chickering, 1946) – Panama
- Messua laxa (Chickering, 1946) – Panama
- Messua limbata (Banks, 1898) – United States, Mexico
- Messua moma (F. O. P.-Cambridge, 1901) – Guatemala to Guyana
- Messua octonotata (F. O. P.-Cambridge, 1901) – Central America
- Messua pura (Bryant, 1948) – Mexico
- Messua tridentata (F. O. P.-Cambridge, 1901) – Mexico
