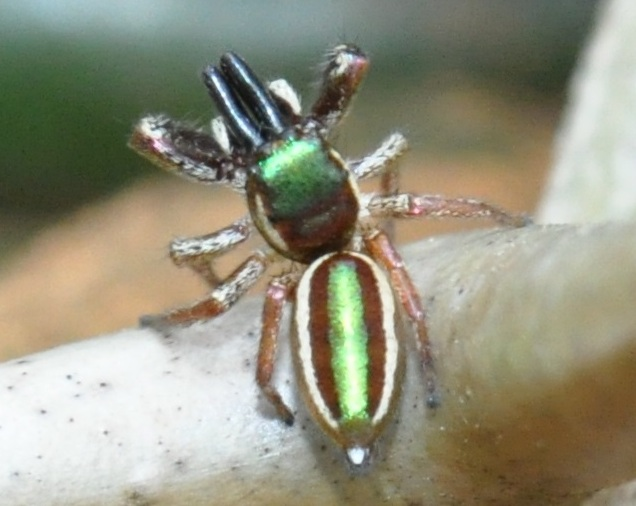
- Bagheera kiplingi

Scientific classification
- Kingdom: Animalia
- Phylum: Arthropoda
- Subphylum: Chelicerata
- Class: Arachnida
- Order: Araneae
- Infraorder: Araneomorphae
- Family: Salticidae
- Subfamily: Salticinae
- Genus: Bagheera; Peckham & Peckham, 1896

Type species
- B. kiplingi Peckham & Peckham, 1896

Species
- 4, see text

= Bagheera (spider) =

Genus of spiders

Bagheera is a genus of jumping spiders within the family Salticidae, subfamily Salticinae and subtribe Dendryphantina. The genus was first described by George Peckham & Elizabeth Peckham in 1896. The name is derived from Bagheera, a character from Rudyard Kipling's Jungle Book.

The type species Bagheera kiplingi is noted for its unique, primarily herbivorous diet of Beltian bodies. Male individuals within the genus may be identified by their elongate, horizontal, parallel chelicerae.

== Species ==
As of June 2019 it contains four species, found in Guatemala, Costa Rica, the United States, and Mexico:

- Bagheera kiplingi Peckham & Peckham, 1896 (type) – Mexico to Costa Rica
- Bagheera laselva Ruiz & Edwards, 2013 – Costa Rica
- Bagheera motagua Ruiz & Edwards, 2013 – Guatemala
- Bagheera prosper (Peckham & Peckham, 1901) – USA, Mexico
