= Raksha (The Jungle Book) =

Fictional character

- The Jungle character
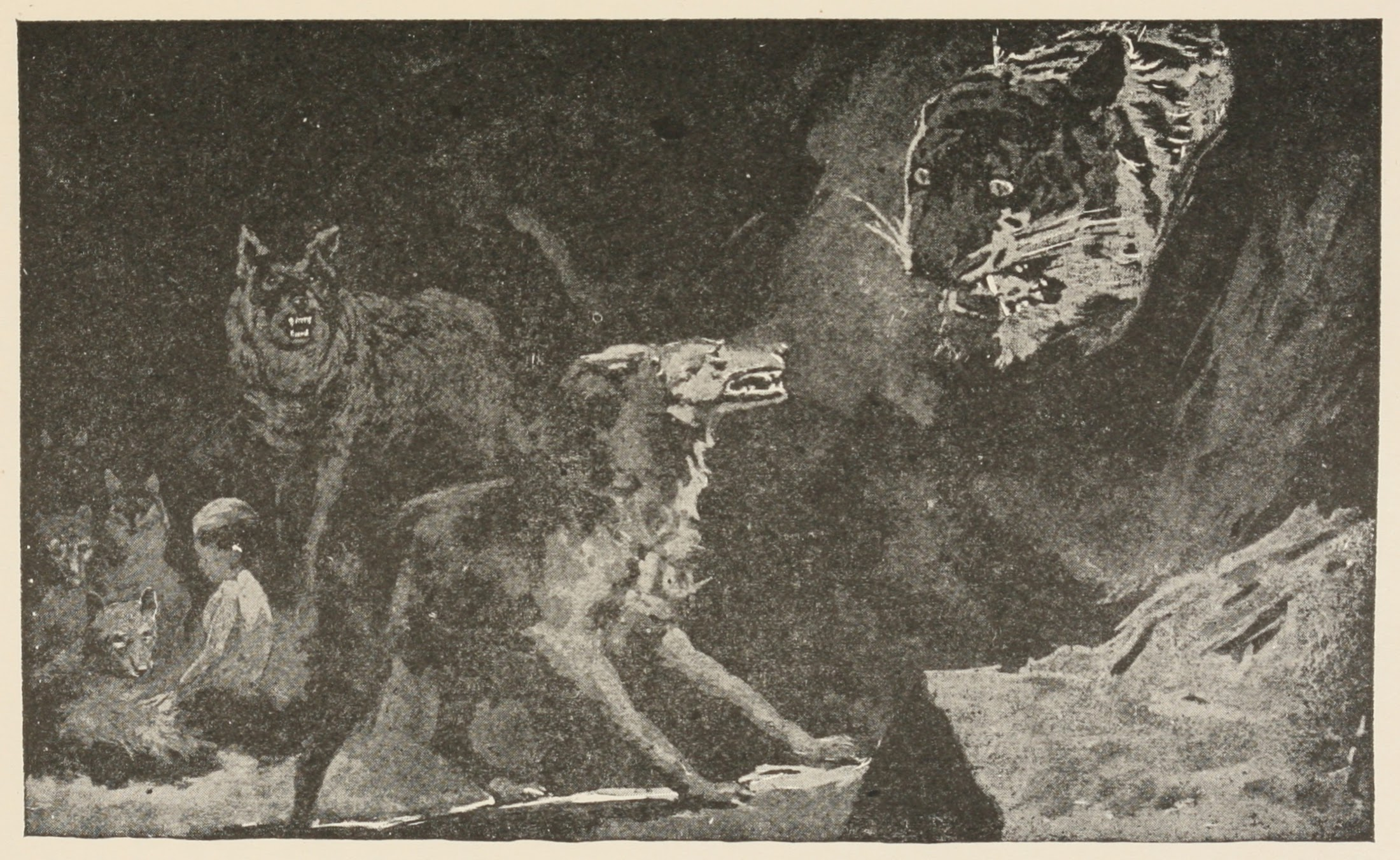
- Raksha defends baby Mowgli from Shere Khan
- First appearance: "Mowgli's Brothers"
- Last appearance: "Letting in the Jungle"
- Created by: Rudyard Kipling

In-universe information
- Species: Indian wolf
- Gender: Female
- Spouse: Father Wolf
- Relatives: Two parents (deceased); Father Wolf (mate); Mowgli (adopted son)

Raksha (Hindi: रक्षा / Rakšā or Mother Wolf as initially named) is a fictional character featured in Rudyard Kipling's Mowgli stories, collected in The Jungle Book and The Second Jungle Book.

== History ==
She is a female Indian wolf, member of the Seeonee pack, who while suckling her own cubs decides also to adopt a human "cub" that her mate Father Wolf has found wandering in the jungle, naming him "Mowgli" (which means "frog" in the Speech of the Jungle) because of his hairlessness.

Defying the tiger Shere Khan, who is determined to eat the man-cub, she reveals that her name is Raksha ("protection/nurture") because of her ferocity as a fighter, and she will fight to the death for any of her cubs, natural or adopted. In some versions, she gives her name to Shere Khan as "Raksha the Demon" ("Rakshasa" means "demon").

Raksha does not play a large role in the Mowgli stories, but occasionally offers her adopted son moral support.

== Disney ==
- Raksha appears briefly at the beginning of Disney's The Jungle Book. Bagheera discovers young Mowgli in the jungle, and takes him to Raksha, who has just had cubs. She raises him along with her own cubs and 10 years later Mowgli is well acquainted with jungle life.
- Raksha appears in The Jungle Book: Mowgli's Story, voiced by Peri Gilpin. This version is the mate of Akela. She is later killed by Shere Khan when she goes to help rescue Mowgli from the Bandar-log.
- Raksha appears in Disney's 2016 live-action adaption where she is voiced by Oscar winner Lupita Nyong'o. In an interview regarding her character, Nyong'o described Raksha as deeply caring for her pups, including Mowgli, whom she adopts as her own, and refers to her as a protector. In the film, Raksha raises Mowgli as her son under the sanctuary of Akela along with her own pups, including Grey Brother, and defends him from Shere Khan when he comes to the watering hole during the drought. However, the tiger's threats towards Mowgli and the pack cause debate on whether or not Mowgli should leave. Mowgli decides to leave with Bagheera to keep the Seeonee pack safe from harm. Though she is reluctant to give Mowgli up, she lets him leave, stating that Mowgli will always be her son. When Shere Khan returns and demands Mowgli be turned over to him only to find he has left, Shere Khan kills Akela and takes control of the pack, hoping it will lure him back. Upon her asking why Shere Khan has done this after Shere Khan telling the cubs a story about the cuckoo, he answers that he wants Mowgli dead as opposed to him simply leaving. When Mowgli returns to face Shere Khan with fire, she along with the rest of the pack are frightened of him as he has accidentally set the jungle ablaze. When he casts the fire away, Raksha rallies the wolves and is joined by Bagheera and Baloo in battling against Shere Khan so Mowgli has enough time to set a trap for the tiger and kill him. After the fire is put out by Mowgli and the elephants, Raksha and the other creatures of the jungle praise Mowgli. Sometime afterwards, Raksha is now the leader of the Seeonee pack, and has gleefully accepted Mowgli back into her family.

== In other media ==
- In the anime Jungle Book Shonen Mowgli, Raksha appears like in the book, except she is renamed Luri, has a more important role in the storyline, and becomes the eventual leader of the wolf pack. She is voiced by Mari Yokoo in the Japanese and Kathleen Fee in the English dub.
- Raksha appears in the animated series The Jungle Book, voiced by Prudence Alcott. She is depicted as a white wolf.
- Raksha appears in the Chuck Jones animated short Mowgli's Brothers as part of Mowgli's origin, with much of her original dialogue from the Kipling story. She is voiced by June Foray.
- Raksha is renamed to Nisha in Mowgli: Legend of the Jungle where the character is voiced by Naomie Harris.
