= Berserk =

Berserk (meaning "very angry" or "out of control") may refer to:

- Berserk (manga), a Japanese manga series by Kentaro Miura
  - Berserk (1997 TV series), the first anime television series adaptation of the manga series
  - Berserk (2016 TV series), the second anime television series adaptation of the manga series
  - Berserk: The Golden Age Arc, a 2012 and 2013 Japanese anime film trilogy adaptation of the manga series
  - Berserk: Millennium Falcon Hen Seima Senki no Shō, a 2004 video game based on the manga series
  - Berserk and the Band of the Hawk, a 2016 crossover video game between the manga series and the Dynasty Warriors video game series
  - Sword of the Berserk: Guts' Rage, a 1999 video game based on the manga series
- Berserk (card game), a 2003 Russian collectible card game
- Berserk (novel), a 2007 novel by Ally Kennen
- Berserk (robot), a Belarusian military robot
- Berserk!, a 1967 British film by Jim O'Connolly
- "Berzerk" (song), a 2013 song by Eminem
- Berzerk (video game), a 1980 video game
- Bezerk (album), a 1990 album by Tigertailz
- "Bezerk" (song), a 2019 song by Big Sean featuring ASAP Ferg

== See also ==
- Apoptygma Berzerk, a Norwegian band
- Berserker (disambiguation)
- Berzék, a village in Borsod-Abaúj-Zemplén, Hungary
- BZRK, a novel series by Michael Grant
- Zerker (disambiguation)
