= Berserker (disambiguation) =

A berserker was a Norse warrior who fought in a trance-like fury.

Berserker or Berzerker may also refer to:

== Film ==
- Berserker (1987 film), a slasher horror film
- Berserker (2004 film), a film based on the Norse concept of the berserker

== Literature and fictional characters ==
- Berserker (novel series), a space opera series by Fred Saberhagen
- Berserker (comics), a series of American comic books
- Berzerker (comics), a Marvel Comics character
- Berserker (Fate/stay Night), a character in Fate/stay night
- Berserker (Soulcalibur), a named character and series of characters from Soulcalibur
- Berserker Armor, a fictional body armor worn by Guts in the manga series Berserk

== Music ==
- Berserker (Amon Amarth album), 2019
- Berserker (Beast in Black album), 2017
- Berserker (Gary Numan album), 1984
- Berserker (Jane album), 2005
- Berserker (EP), by Scratch Acid, 1986
- "Berserker", a song by Love Among Freaks from the 1994 soundtrack Clerks: Music from the Motion Picture
- The Berzerker, an Australian industrial death metal band
  - The Berzerker (album), 2000
- "Berserkers", a song by Black Label Society from the 2002 album 1919 Eternal

== Other uses ==
- Berserker, Queensland, a suburb of Rockhampton, Queensland, Australia
- Berserker Range, a mountainous region in Queensland, Australia
- Berserker, a hypothetical and fictional self-replicating spacecraft
- John Nord (born 1959), professional wrestler known as The Berzerker

== See also ==
- Berserk (disambiguation)
- Zerker (disambiguation)
- Lewis chessmen, four of which are shown as wild-eyed berserkers
