= RSJ (band) =

English metalcore band

- Origin: York, England
- Genres: Metalcore, Mathcore
- Years active: 2002–2017
- Labels: Copro Records, Hangmans Joke
- Members: Dan Cook; Gareth Vaughn Thomas; Matt Gamblin; Greg Parsons; Dan Kentley
- Past members: Richard Hardy; Jonny Swire; Russ Hampshire
- Website: https://www.facebook.com/rsjband

RSJ were an English metalcore band from York, England.

== History ==
Started in 2002, the band set about creating heavy, groovy, noise metal. The band took their name from the construction term Rolled Steel Joist, an 'in-joke' to referencing "a good support or a piece of heavy metal".

Their debut EP, The Day After, was released in September 2002 and paved the way forward, gaining worldwide sales through the band's website and earning them a loyal fanbase. Their high-energy live shows landed the band supports with Funeral for a Friend, Raging Speedhorn and Orange Goblin.

2004 saw RSJ sign to Hangmans Joke Recordings and released their second EP, Blueprint for a Brighter Future. The EP featured the band's debut promo video for the track 'Reborn' and saw their first small screen appearance on British music channel, Scuzz TV. The EP received critical acclaim with Nuts magazine hailing the band as "the heaviest band to come out of the UK in a long time". In April 2004, a member of Bullet for My Valentine's management team saw RSJ play a show in Reading and were offered a support slot to with American metal-core band, Unearth, at the Camden Barfly in London in June of that year.

In 2005, the band signed to British independent label Copro Records and saw their first album Reflections in B Minor. Produced by Dave Chang (Earthtone9), the 12-track album received further reviews and gave the track "Dystonia" an inclusion on Metal Hammer's monthly cover disc.

Australian grindcore band, The Berzerker, chose RSJ as one of the rotating support bands for their 2006 14-day UK trek for their 'World of Lies' album, again giving flawless reviews of their energetic stage shows and leading to further articles in Metal Hammer and Kerrang!. In autumn of that year, the band went back into the studio to write material for their next album, Gain to Nothing, which was released the following year.

In October 2007, the band won the Glasswerk "Best New Metal Band" award, which automatically earned them a headline slot on the Scuzz TV stage at 2008's Bloodstock festival. The band took the remainder of 2007 to write new material.

Shortly after their appearance at Bloodstock, drummer Rich Hardy left the band. A month later, RSJ won the "15 Minutes Of Fame" competition which was hosted by Metal Hammer, Scuzz TV and the Radio One Rock Show - which won the band an opening slot on Slayer's third "Unholy Alliance" tour alongside Amon Amarth, Mastodon and Trivium. Dom White of The Family Ruin, filled in while the band searched for a new drummer. In December, Greg Parsons was named as RSJ's new drummer and the band set out to write new material for their as-yet-untitled third album.

In 2010 the band opened the Jägermeister Stage at Sonisphere Festival, Knebworth, England. They entered the studio shortly after to record demos for their as-yet-untitled third album.

The band played a few shows during the course of 2011 including opening up for Will Haven on their single UK show that at the O2 Islington Academy in London.

2012 saw RSJ's debut appearances at both Hammerfest and Hard Rock Hell: Road Trip to Ibiza festivals. Spring and Summer 2013 saw the band being invited back to Hammerfest and HRH: Road Trip to Ibiza festivals for the second time. In November, they were announced as main support for American Headcharge during their "Shoot" tour. While on the road, the band released their third album Higgs Boson.

In August 2014, the band completed writing tracks for their fourth album, Giant Glenn and was recorded live and produced by ex-Earthone9 and This Is Menage guitarist, Gez Walton in November 2014. After numerous hold ups, Giant Glenn was eventually released in September 2016. Metal Hammer described it as "their most intense and raw record to date."

On 8 May 2017 the band announced via their Facebook page that "After 15 years of blood, sweat & beers, it’s not without heavy hearts that we’ve come to the decision to lay ((RSJ)) to rest.". Their final appearance as a band was at Fibbers on 21 July 2017.

However, the band later on did do another show in 2023 in York. Their final appearance was at The Crescent on 25 March 2023.

== Discography ==
=== Albums ===
- Reflections In B Minor (2005)
- Gain To Nothing (2007)
- Higgs Boson (2013)
- Giant Glenn (2016)

=== EPs ===
- The Day After (2002)
- Blueprint For A Brighter Future (2004)
- The Final Sigh/RSJ Tour Split (2005)

=== DVD ===
- Reborn (Promotional Video) (2004)
- Deadbolt (Promotional Video) (2007)
