= Animosity =

Animosity may refer to:

- Animosity (comic), an American comic book series published by AfterShock Comics
- Animosity (band), an American death metal band formed in 2000
- Animosity (Corrosion of Conformity album), 1985
- Animosity (Sevendust album), 2001
- Animosity (The Berzerker album), 2007
- Animosity (film), a 2013 horror film

== See also ==
- Animositisomina, a 2003 album by Ministry
