= Fergal Reilly =

Irish animator, storyboard artist and film director

- Born: Ardee, Ireland
- Occupations: Film director, storyboard artist, voice actor, animator
- Years active: 1996–present

Fergal Reilly is an Irish film director, storyboard artist, voice actor and animator best known for directing the animated film The Angry Birds Movie.

== Early life and career ==
Reilly was born in Ardee, Ireland, and moved to the United States at the age of nineteen. He started working at the Walt Disney Studios in Los Angeles, and Dale Baer Animation as an animator and story board artist. He was a story artist on the Warner Brothers animated and hybrid movies Space Jam, The Iron Giant, and Osmosis Jones.

He is an alumnus of Gormanston College a former boarding school in Ireland where he drew comics, cartoons and caricatures in lieu of any formal art classes. He attended the Dún Laoghaire Institute of Art, Design and Technology where he initially studied graphic design, but always suspected that he did not want to spend his life "pushing type around reports for banks."

Reilly was among the first animation artists to work on both live-action and animated movies. He left Warner's to work on Stuart Little and The Haunted Mansion creating storyboards and concept art. In 2002 he helped visualize the action set pieces for Spider-Man 2, including the train battle between Spider-Man and Doc Ock.

In 2003 he joined Sony Pictures' new animation division and spent 10 years there as a story artist and story supervisor helping develop projects for their family entertainment slate. He also worked with Jon Favreau and Richard Linklater as a story supervisor on special projects.

In 2011 he was slated to direct a film adaptation of The Familiars with Doug Sweetland and Sam Raimi producing for Sony/Columbia Pictures. The film was cancelled.

In 2012 Reilly was picked by the Irish Technology Leadership Group (ITLG) as one of the most influential Irish Americans influencing the worlds of entertainment and technology alongside Kathleen Kennedy producer of Star Wars: The Force Awakens.

Reilly made his feature film directing debut in 2016 with The Angry Birds Movie, which he co-directed with Clay Kaytis for Sony Pictures Entertainment. The film was based on the Rovio Entertainment's video game Angry Birds. Jon Vitti wrote the screenplay for the film, which was released in the United States on 20 May 2016. In a 2016 interview for Collider, when asked about the challenge of turning a game app into a blockbuster animated movie he said "We didn't think about the intimidation factor. There was a lot of noise about how do you turn an app into a movie. But, for us, as soon as we see the creative problem, we just start to focus on it. Both our trainings, I mean, we’ve spent our whole careers creating character. It's an intense process, but that's what we’ve done." The movie opened at number one in over 50 countries and the US, toppling Marvel's Captain America: Civil War off the top spot and setting records for May. It was Sony's top grossing blockbuster of 2016 at the box office, grossing 353 million dollars on a 73 million dollar budget. It also opened number 1 in digital downloads on ITunes and on DVDs and Blu-ray.

In 2019 it was announced in The Hollywood Reporter that Reilly would direct Pete and Goat, an R-rated, live-action dramedy. Mike Vukadinovich is behind the original screenplay. Daniel Dubiecki (Juno, Thank You for Smoking) and Lara Alameddine (Money Monster) will produce the pic under their Allegiance Theater banner, with Stuart Ford's AGC Studios financing.

In September 2020 Variety announced that he would direct an adaption of the New York Times best seller Ronan Boyle and the Bridge of Riddles for DreamWorks. The middle grade fantasy book series was written by author and actor/comedian Thomas Lennon who would also write the screenplay.

== Filmography ==
=== As director ===
- The Angry Birds Movie (2016)

=== As actor ===
- Open Season (2006) – O'Toole
- The Angry Birds Movie (2016) – Foreman Pig

=== Story Artist /Animator ===
- Space Jam (1996) – Storyboard artist / animator
- The Iron Giant (1999) – Story artist
- Osmosis Jones (2001) – Storyboard artist
- The Haunted Mansion (2003) – Storyboard artist
- Spider-Man 2 (2004) – Storyboard artist
- The Longest Yard (2005) – Storyboard artist
- Open Season (2006) – Storyboard artist
- Cloudy with a Chance of Meatballs (2009) – Storyboard artist
- The Smurfs (2011) – Storyboard supervisor
- Hotel Transylvania (2012) – Storyboard artist
