= Sam Raimi's unrealized projects =

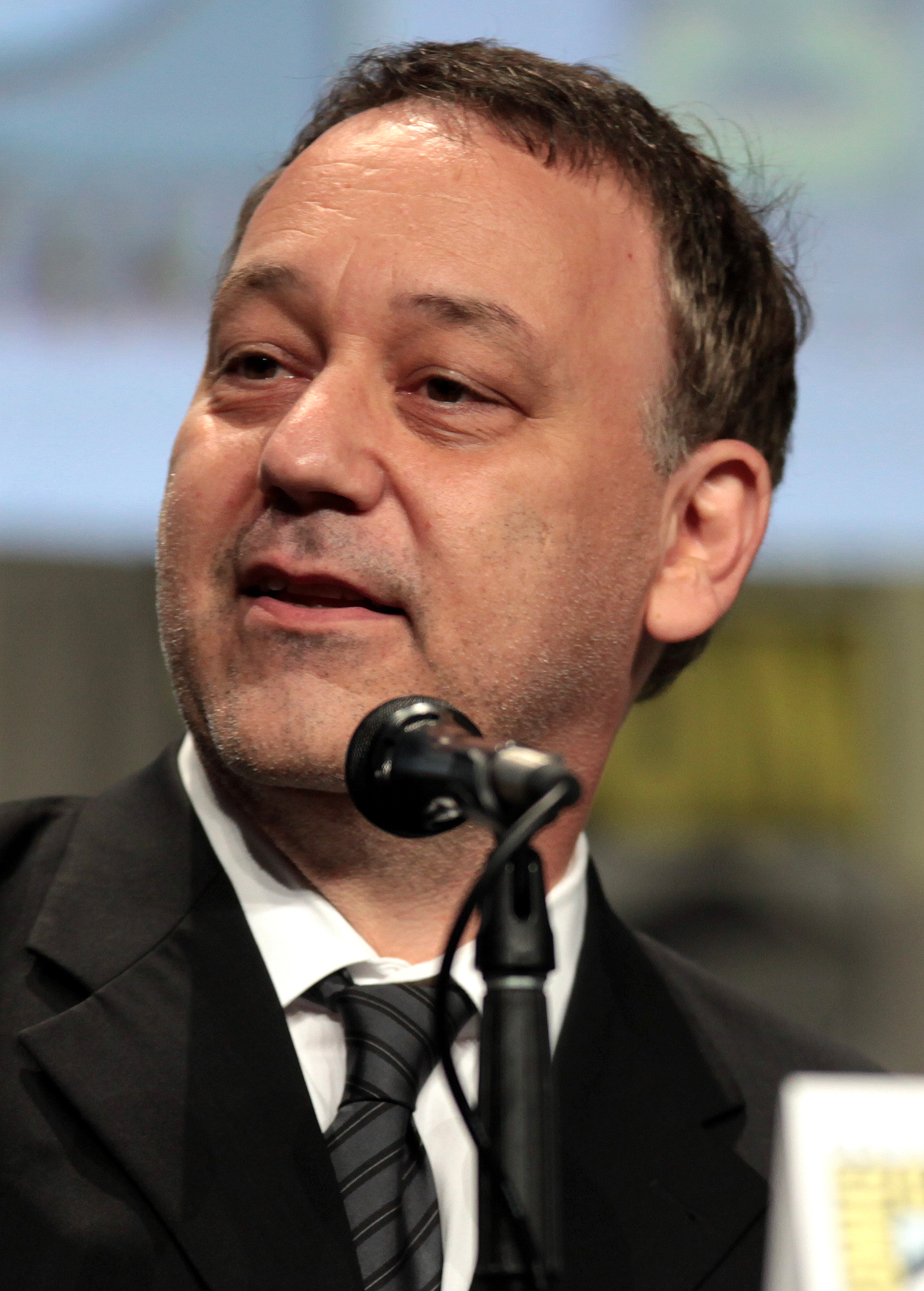
Raimi in 2014

During his career, American film director and producer Sam Raimi has worked on a number of projects which never progressed beyond the pre-production stage under his direction. Some of these projects are officially cancelled and scrapped, or they are considered to be in development hell.

== As director ==
=== The Guardian ===
In the late 1980s, Raimi was initially attached to The Guardian, based on the 1987 book The Nanny by Dan Greenburg, but left in order to direct Darkman instead. According to screenwriter Stephen Volk, he and Raimi developed it as an "Omen-esque" horror film with set-pieces bordering on parody, but when William Friedkin replaced him, the script was rewritten from scratch.

=== Thor ===
In 1990, after finishing with the filming of Darkman, Raimi pitched, along with Marvel Comics writer Stan Lee, the concept of a Thor feature film to 20th Century Fox. However, they didn't understand Raimi's and Lee's idea and the project was abandoned. A film based on the Thor property was released years later in 2011 and directed by Kenneth Branagh, as the fourth installment of the Marvel Cinematic Universe under Paramount Pictures.

=== Dracula ===
According to the 2001 book, The Evil Dead Companion, Raimi was at one point either attached or had turned down an offer to direct an adaptation of the Bram Stoker novel, Dracula, based on a screenplay by Kevin Jarre.

=== Jack Frost ===
In 1994, Raimi was attached to direct Jack Frost, then under the working title of Frosty the Snowman. He and his brother Ivan Raimi had performed a rewrite on the screenplay written by Mark Steven Johnson, but after George Clooney dropped out of the film, Raimi would leave a couple months later. Troy Miller would eventually replace him.

=== The Damocles Network ===
In April 1995, Variety indicated that Raimi had signed on to Morgan Creek's project The Damocles Network, scripted by John Pogue about a surveillance expert who discovers a high-tech government assassination conspiracy and becomes a target himself. Johnny Depp was being eyed for the main role, with Neal H. Moritz and David Heyman attached to co-produce.

=== The Green Hornet ===
In December 1995, it was reported that Raimi had been in talks to direct a film version of the 1966 series The Green Hornet, with George Clooney attached to star as the title character, and Jason Scott Lee as Kato. It was planned for a spring production start the following year, though these plans were shelved once Clooney committed to The Peacemaker instead.

=== Crossroaders ===
In 1997, TriStar Pictures purchased James Shanta's spec script Crossroaders, with Raimi attached to direct and Neal H. Moritz producing. The project was described at the time as "a contemporary Sting" about a young con man who takes down a casino with the help of an older gang.

=== The Wee Free Men ===
In January 2006, Raimi was set to direct The Wee Free Men based on the book of the same name by Terry Pratchett, but in December 2009 Pratchett said that he had "got the rights to the book back" after reading the proposed screenplay.

=== Untitled pulp hero team-up film ===
In December 2006, IGN reported that Raimi was developing to direct a project that would bring several classic pulp heroes associated with the publishing house Street & Smith to the bigscreen. These included The Shadow, the Avenger, and Doc Savage, amongst other characters. Screenwriter Siavash Farahani was said to be working alongside Raimi. No further updates were provided.

=== The Hobbit ===
On April 18, 2007, Raimi stated that he was open to direct the long time planned The Hobbit film adaptation that was already planned since 1995. However, it was finally decided to divide the book in three films and on April 24, 2008, Mexican film director Guillermo del Toro was selected to direct the film and Peter Jackson was selected to produce it. The films were finally released in 2012, 2013, and 2014 directed by Jackson and written by del Toro.

=== Evil Dead 4 ===
On May 3, 2007, Raimi announced that after completing Spider-Man 3 he along his brother Ivan would work on Evil Dead 4, a sequel to Raimi's Army of Darkness and the fourth installment in the Evil Dead film series. On July 26, 2008, Raimi stated that Ivan was writing a script for Evil Dead 4. On March 26, 2009, Raimi stayed that Ivan had finished the Evil Dead 4 script. In a 2011 Reddit post, Bruce Campbell remarked that Oz the Great and Powerful was keeping Raimi occupied. The franchise was later rebooted in 2013 with Fede Álvarez as director. Plans for a fourth "Evil Dead" movie eventually evolved into the television series Ash Vs. Evil Dead, which served as a sequel to Army of Darkness and a conclusion to the character of Ash Williams.

=== Spider-Man 4 ===
Around 2007, after the release of Spider-Man 3, it was announced that Spider-Man 4 was in development and that Raimi would direct it, while Tobey Maguire, Kirsten Dunst and the other members of the cast were attached to reprise their roles. Also, it was announced that the fourth Spider-Man film was to be shot back-to-back with Spider-Man 5, while Spider-Man 6 was also in development, but Raimi finally decided to only shoot Spider-Man 4 at that moment. James Vanderbilt was to write the film and its two planned sequels; although David Koepp was also considered to write it. Also, on December 8, 2009, it was reported John Malkovich was slated to portray the Vulture while Anne Hathaway was slated to portray Black Cat. Bruce Campbell was planned to have another cameo appearance, potentially as Mysterio. However, on January 11, 2010, it was officially reported that Sony Pictures had cancelled the production of Spider-Man 4 after Raimi concluded that he was not going to be able to release the film in time with a not so exciting script. The franchise was later rebooted in 2012 with Marc Webb as director.

=== Jack Ryan film series ===
In March 2008, Paramount Pictures were in talks with Raimi to direct a new Jack Ryan franchise. Paramount chose Kenneth Branagh for Jack Ryan: Shadow Recruit.

=== The Given Day ===
On June 16, 2008, it was reported that Raimi would develop and direct an adaptation of the Dennis Lehane book The Given Day for Columbia Pictures. No further developments have been made since then.

=== World of Warcraft ===
On July 22, 2009, Blizzard Entertainment reported that Raimi was hired to direct a film adaptation of its popular video game Warcraft entitled World of Warcraft. However, on July 13, 2012, it was announced that Raimi would not direct the Warcraft film because he was working on Oz the Great and Powerful and he needed to finish its post-production. The film was finally released in 2016 as Warcraft and directed by Duncan Jones.

=== Ruse film ===
In January 2009, Siavash Farahani announced he has written a Ruse film script for Disney with Raimi directing the project. Since then, there have been no further announcements.

=== Earp: Saints For Sinners ===
On July 19, 2010, Deadline announced that DreamWorks will develop the adaptation of M. Zachary Sherman's Earp: Saints For Sinners with Raimi directing and producing the project with David Hoberman, Todd Lieberman, and Radical Studios' Barry Levine, with Matt Cirulnick writing the script. Since then, there have been no further announcements since.

=== The Outpost ===
On June 26, 2014, it was reported that Raimi would produce and supervise development of a script for an adaptation of Jake Tapper's book The Outpost: An Untold Story of American Valor. Raimi was also considering to direct. However, Raimi felt that he wasn't the right person to direct, and he left the film. Rod Lurie would eventually direct and the film itself would be released on July 3, 2020 with no involvement from Raimi at all.

=== Love May Fail ===
In October 2014, Deadline Hollywood reported that Raimi was in talks to direct the adaptation of Matthew Quick's book Love May Fail for Columbia Pictures from a Mike White script. In November 2015, it was reported that Raimi would not direct the film as TriStar Pictures took over the movie with Emma Stone set to play the lead.

=== A Prophet remake ===
On January 22, 2016, Deadline Hollywood reported that Raimi was in talks to direct Sony's remake of A Prophet, with Neal H. Moritz and Tobe Jaffe producing, and Dennis Lehane writing the script. The remake eventually became Rapman's American Son and moved to Paramount Players, but it fell apart.

=== World War 3 ===
On February 26, 2016, it was confirmed that Raimi was attached to direct the film World War 3 for Warner Bros. The film would have been based on a possible future inspired by the book The Next 100 Years by George Friedman. There have been no further announcements since.

=== Bermuda ===
On February 16, 2017, it was reported that Raimi will be directing a thriller about the Bermuda Triangle for Skydance Media, with the script being written by Doug Miro and Carlo Bernard. On March 4, 2020, it was reported that Skydance replaced Raimi with Scott Derrickson for the movie. On September 19, 2023, it was announced that Marc Webb would now direct the film, with new writers expected to be hired for the project upon the conclusion of the 2023 Writers Guild of America strike.

=== The Kingkiller Chronicle ===
On January 29, 2018, it was announced that Raimi was set to direct the first movie in the big-screen adaptation of Patrick Rothfuss's Kingkiller Chronicle series, The Name of the Wind, with Rothfuss and Hamilton creator Lin-Manuel Miranda serving as executive producers. Raimi was no longer involved with the project since December 2018. There have been no further announcements since.

=== Magic ===
In 2022, producer Roy Lee revealed during an appearance on Post Mortem with Mick Garris that Raimi would be directing a new version of William Goldman's Magic; which had been made previously in 1978. By 2026, following the success of Send Help, screenwriters Mark Swift and Damian Shannon were set in place to adapt Magic for Raimi.

=== Untitled third Doctor Strange film ===
In 2024, journalist Jeff Sneider reported that Raimi was nearing a deal about returning to direct a third Doctor Strange film for the MCU, following Doctor Strange in the Multiverse of Madness.

== As producer ==
=== ArchEnemies ===
As of September 2006, Raimi has signed a deal to adapt the series into a film. Screenwriter Patrick O'Neill (Knight and Day), was hired to write the script; Raimi will act as producer along with Mike Richardson and Josh Donen.

=== The Shadow ===
On December 10, 2006, SuperHero Hype reported that Raimi would co-produce along producer Michael Uslan a new film adaptation of The Shadow for Columbia Pictures. On October 16, 2007, SuperHero Hype reported that Raimi was still planning The Shadow film along his producing partner Josh Donen. However, in 2011, it was reported that Quentin Tarantino would apparently direct the film without the presence of Raimi. At the end, on August 23, 2012, during a Q&A with ShadowFan, Raimi announced that he didn't develop a good script for the film and decided to abandon its production.

=== The Taking ===
On December 18, 2006, it was announced that Raimi had formed a television unit of his production company Ghost House Pictures, and one of the first projects was a miniseries adaptation of the Dean Koontz novel The Taking. No further development had been made.

=== Monster Zoo ===
In March 2008, Paramount Pictures and Sam Raimi were set to develop the graphic novel Monster Zoo from Doug TenNapel. However, the movie is in development hell.

=== Sleeper film ===
In August 2008, Tom Cruise and Sam Raimi were in the process of creating a movie adaptation of Sleeper with Warner Bros., in which Cruise may have starred and Brad Ingelsby is writing the screenplay, but this rumor went cold. In November 2013, the magazine Variety reported that Matt Damon, Ben Affleck and Jennifer Todd took over the film as producers and Shawn Ryan and David Wiener to pen the film. Since then, there have not been any further announcements, falling into development hell.

=== Anguish remake ===
In February 2009, an American remake of the Spanish film Anguish was announced to be produced by Raimi and Rob Tapert through Ghost House Pictures and Roy Lee and Doug Davison through Vertigo Entertainment. The screenplay was written by Jake Wade Wall. No further development was reported, and a new remake by F. Javier Gutiérrez was announced without the involvement of Raimi.

=== The Dorm ===
In February 2009, it was reported that Danish director Martin Barnewitz would direct an American remake of his film Room 205, with Stephen Susco adapting the film. The remake would be titled The Dorm, and Raimi and Tapert would produce through Ghost House Pictures. There have been no further announcements since.

=== Refuge ===
In September 2009, Empire announced that Corin Hardy will direct Refuge from Tom De Ville's script and produced by Raimi. Since then, there have been no further announcements since.

=== The Substitute remake ===
In October 2009, Brad Miska announced that Scott Derrickson will direct the American remake of The Substitute and co-wrote the script with Paul Harris Boardman and Raimi producing the project for Columbia Pictures. Since then, there have been no further announcements.

=== This Man ===
On May 5, 2010, Bryan Bertino announced that he would write and direct a film based on the Internet urban legend This Man, and Raimi and Tappert would produce through Ghost House Pictures. Ghost House also bought the rights to the website. No further development has been made.

=== Burst ===
In June 2010, Brad Miska announced that Neil Marshall will direct Burst and Raimi producing the project. Since then, there have been no further announcements since.

=== Untitled Female Prosecutor drama ===
On September 28, 2010, Deadline reported that ABC, Raimi and Robert Zotnowski will produce the Dee Johnson series about a top LA female prosecutor. Since then, there have been no further announcements since.

=== Smokers ===
On September 28, 2010, Deadline reported that Fox, Raimi and Robert Zotnowski will produce the Brian K. Vaughan series Smokers, a drama about a documentary crew following working class heroes who exterminate alien threats in deep space. Since then, there have been no further announcements since.

=== Lanchester ===
On September 28, 2010, Deadline reported that CBS, Raimi and Robert Zotnowski will produce the Andrew Lipsitz series Lanchester, about a Scotland Yard detective who joins the LAPD. Since then, there have been no further announcements since.

=== EDF: Earth Defense Force ===
On September 29, 2010, Vulture reported that Warner Bros, Raimi and Bill Block will produce the Andrew Marlowe script EDF, and hired Danny Strong for rewrites in December 2010. Since then, there have been no further announcements since.

=== The Au Pair ===
On 6 October 2010, Deadline reported that Good Universe, Furst Films and Raimi's Ghost House banner will produce the adaptation of R.L. Stine's novel The Sitter, from a Dana Stevens script with the title, The Au Pair. Since then, there have been no further announcements since.

=== The Day of the Triffids remake ===
On 20 October 2010, Deadline reported that Mandate Pictures, Don Murphy, Mark Gordon and Raimi's Ghost House banner will produce the adaptation of John Wyndham's novel The Day of the Triffids. On 23 January 2014, Mike Newell will direct the remake and Neil Cross wrote the script. Since then, there have been no further announcements since.

=== Live-action Noir series ===
On November 11, 2010, A possible live action feature based on the anime series has been planned for development by the cable television network Starz. Sam Raimi and Rob Tapert are the executive producers for the project. Steve Lightfoot was serving as executive producer and writer but was replaced by Sean Jablonski. In June 2011, Starz gave a greenlight to the show with a straight to series order. The number of episodes of the first season has yet to be determined, though some speculated it will likely be in the 8–13 episode range. In March 2012, Starz CEO Chris Albrecht commented that production has been put on hiatus as he states in an interview, "We're in a bit of holding pattern with Noir." Then in December of that year, two new writers, Cyrus Voris and Ethan Reiff, were announced to have joined the project and were undergoing re-writes of Jablonski's scripts. By January 2013, Starz CEO Chris Albrecht announced that the project remained at a standstill citing difficulty to get the project creatively to a good place.

=== The Casebook of Victor Frankenstein ===
On 23 May 2011, Deadline reported that RT Features and Raimi's Ghost House Pictures will produce the Peter Ackroyd's novel The Casebook of Victor Frankenstein, with David Auburn writing the script. Since then, there have been no further announcements since.

=== Vanish pilot ===
On 19 October 2011, NBC ordered the pilot Vanish from Moonlight co-creator Trevor Munson about a man with a mysterious past who protects deserving people from danger, and helps them disappear, with Raimi producing and Michael Dinner would direct the potential pilot. The pilot wasn't greenlight.

=== The Knifeman TV series ===
On 12 March 2012, Deadline reported that Raimi and David Cronenberg will produce Rolin Jones and Ron Fitzgerald's TV series based on Wendy Moore's novel The Knifeman, for Media Rights Capital with Cronenberg directing the pilot. Since then, there have been no further announcements since.

=== Kazorn & The Unicorn ===
In 2012, Deadline reported that Kelly Asbury was in the talks with Sony Pictures Animation to make an animated fantasy film titled Kazorn & The Unicorn. It would've followed the adventures of a young man and a unicorn as he seeks to locate a powerful weapon and prove his worth to his true love. Lloyd Taylor was writing the screenplay. Sam Raimi, Josh Donen and Russell Hollander were producing. However the project was cancelled after no news came and problems at Sony Pictures Animation.

=== BZRK ===
On 25 July 2012, Deadline reported that Raimi will produce the first adaptation of Michael Grant's book series BZRK, to start a franchise for Columbia Pictures with Michael Ross writing the script. There have been no further announcements since.

=== Angelfall ===
In November 2012, Deadline reported that Good Universe and Raimi's Ghost House will produce the adaptation of Susan Ee's book Angelfall. Since then, there have been no further announcements.

=== Possible 2013 Evil Dead sequel ===
At the SXSW premiere, Álvarez announced that a sequel was in the works. In addition, Sam Raimi confirmed plans to write Evil Dead 4 with his brother; it was later specified that this film would be Army of Darkness 2. At a WonderCon panel in March 2013, Campbell and Álvarez stated that their ultimate plan was for Álvarez's Evil Dead 2 and Raimi's Army of Darkness 2 to be followed by a seventh film which would merge the narratives of Ash and Mia. On October 30, 2013, co-writer Rodo Sayagues confirmed to DeadHollywood that he and Álvarez would not return for the sequel. That same month, Álvarez took to his Twitter that the rumor was not true.

In November 2018, Fede announced that "This is just concepts for the moment. I have nothing to announce official. We have a scenario for Don't Breathe 2 this is the true difference. There is no script for Evil Dead 2, but we have written a for Don't Breathe 2. " he also said that "When I tweeted, it was because I was interested in what people preferred to see. I was in the process of discussing what people wanted to see. Unfortunately, this is Evil Dead 2, which won out. I would have liked this to be Don't Breathe 2, because this is one of my own creations. Obviously, the Evil Dead has a much wider audience."

=== The Last of Us ===
On March 6, 2014, IGN reported that Raimi was attached to produce a film adaptation of the Naughty Dog's popular video game The Last of Us, while Neil Druckmann was attached to write it. However, on April 4, 2016, it was reported that the film had fallen in development hell. On November 15, 2016, Raimi stated that the film was abandoned due to creative differences between Sony Pictures and Druckmann. The film has since transitioned into a TV series for HBO.

=== The Blade Itself ===
In October 2014, Raimi was set to produce the film adaptation of The Blade Itself by Marcus Sakey, with Aaron Stockard writing the script and Tobey Maguire starring and producing the film. Since then, there have been no further announcements since.

=== Cancelled Xena reboot ===
On July 20, 2015, it was reported that NBC was developing a Xena reboot series, with Raimi and Tapert returning as executive producers, with the show's debut sometime in 2016. Insiders also requested that Lawless returns to the series as Xena, as well as take up a role in the show's production. A day later, Lawless tweeted that the reboot is a rumor. On August 13, 2015, NBC Entertainment chairman Bob Greenblatt confirmed the reboot is in development. It was announced from Entertainment Weekly that Javier Grillo-Marxuach will serve as writer and producer for the reboot. In a post on Tumblr Grillo-Marxuach made the statement that they will be "fully exploring a relationship that could only be shown subtextually in first-run syndication in the 1990s," which several websites such as The Guardian and Newsweek have taken it to mean "Xena will be an out and proud lesbian." These articles have resulted in frustration from fans regarding the apparent erasure of Xena's bisexuality, but Grillo-Marxuach has answered "it feels like – from a few sentences – everyone has already made up their mind about what it is I am doing. I would prefer people be surprised by the story." In April 2017, Grillo-Marxuach announced that he had left the project because of "insurmountable creative differences." On August 21, 2017, NBC announced that it had cancelled its plans for the reboot. NBC Entertainment president Jennifer Salke said, "I'd never say never on that one because it's such a beloved title but the current incarnation of it is dead."

=== Miracle Man series ===
On December 7, 2015, NBC ordered the Sam Raimi produced series Miracle Man from The Great Debaters writer Robert Eisele with Kevin Sorbo producing and starring as Jason Greene, a decorated Army Ranger who is nearly killed in Afghanistan and discovered he has the power to make miracles happen.

=== Stormfall ===
On June 3, 2016, it was confirmed that Raimi is attached to produce and possibly direct the film Stormfall for Warner Bros, and is looking for writers to pen the script. There have been no further announcements since.

=== Tanis ===
On July 17, 2017, it was announced that Raimi would produce a television series based on the podcast Tanis for Universal Cable Productions. Original podcast creator Terry Miles would develop with Lee Shipman. No further development has been reported since then.
