= Making out (disambiguation) =

Making out refers to various casual sexual behaviors including kissing and petting.

Making Out or Make Out may also refer to:

- Makeout (band), an American pop punk band
- Make Out (band), an American pop rock band
- Making Out (TV series), a British television series
- Making Out (book series), a series of young adult novels
- Makin' Out (album), a 1961 album by John Wright
- "Making Out" (song), by No Doubt from the album Rock Steady
