= Front Lines (novel) =

Young adult historical novel by Michael Grant

- First edition cover
- Author: Michael Grant
- Language: English
- Series: Front Lines Trilogy
- Genre: Young adult fiction, Alternate history
- Publisher: Egmont Publishing
- Publication date: January 28, 2016
- Publication place: United States
- Media type: Print (Paperback)
- Pages: 480
- ISBN: 978-1-4052-7382-4

Front Lines is a young adult historical novel by the American writer Michael Grant, who is most famous for his dystopian young adult fictional series The Gone Series. It is written from the viewpoint of three girls, Rio Richlin, Frangie Marr, and Rainy Schulterman.

== Plot ==
Front Lines starts out in 1942 and war is raging in Europe, China, Southeast Asia and Northern Africa. Millions have died.

In the USA, a court decision has made women eligible for service. So in Gedwell Falls, California Rio Richlin is deciding whether to enlist, as is Rainy Schulterman in New York City and Frangie Marr in Tulsa, Oklahoma.

These three girls sign up to fight, each of them with dreams and aspirations. Each has her own reasons for volunteering: Rio fights to honor her dead sister, Rachel; Frangie needs money to support her family, as her father has not been able to work since he was injured; and Jewish Rainy wants to kill Germans and bring down Hitler. For the first time they leave behind their homes and families—to go to war. But not everyone believes that women should be on the front lines and they encounter resistance as well as encouragement.

Front Lines tracks the girls through their different paths, Rio is literally on the front lines, Frangie is learning to be a medic and Rainy is training to be in an elite intelligence unit. While they all have wildly different backgrounds and are on seemingly separate paths, fate brings them together.

== Characters ==
- Rio Richlin: Main character, white, 17-year-old from Gedwell Falls, California. Grant has stated that he based her in part on Audie Murphy.
- Jenou Castain: Rio's best friend, white, also from Gedwell Falls, California.
- Strand Braxton: Rio's love interest, also from Gedwell Falls, California. He is enlisted in the Air Corps as a B-17 pilot.
- Frangie Marr: African-American, 18-year-old from Tulsa, Oklahoma. She wants to become a doctor, and trains as an army medic.
- Rainy (Elisheva) Schulterman: A Jewish girl from New York City. Multilingual. Her goal is to destroy the Nazis, which she does by serving as an intelligence agent.

== Reception ==
Booklist wrote "Though it's an epic story with a page count to match, the dynamic characters and urgent plot never get lost in the enormity of the historical moment." and the School Library Journal calls it "imaginative" and found "Though the length may put some teen readers off, the alternative history and wartime plot, which reads like a movie, will appeal to many." Kirkus Reviews wrote "Bestselling science-fiction author Grant did his research (an extensive bibliography is provided), but the odd and likely unintended consequence of his premise is the erasure of thousands of military women who historically served and fought and died. Still an engrossing portrayal of ordinary women in extraordinary circumstances." and Publishers Weekly describes Front Lines a "skillfully imagined alternate history."

== Sequels ==
Front Lines is the first book in a trilogy, followed by Silver Stars (2017) and Purple Hearts (2018). Grant also wrote a short novel about the characters, Dead of Night, for World Book Day (UK and Ireland) in 2017.
