= Dissimulate (album) =

Studio album by The Berzerker
- Released: August 26, 2002
- Recorded: Feb–Apr 2002
- Genre: Deathgrind, industrial metal
- Length: 34:39
- Label: Earache

The Berzerker chronology
The Berzerker (2000)	Dissimulate (2002)	World of Lies (2005)

Professional ratings
Review scores
Source	Rating
AllMusic	3/5 stars
Terrorizer	(Nov 2008)

Dissimulate is the second album, released in 2002, by the death metal band The Berzerker. This is the only full-length album the band has released that features an actual drummer instead of a drum machine.

The album is characterized by some quotes from the Italian film "Africa Addio".

== Track listing ==
1. "Disregard" – 1:20
2. "Failure" – 2:26
3. "The Principles and Practices of Embalming" – 3:25
4. "No One Wins" – 1:50
5. "Death Reveals" – 1:56
6. "Compromise" – 2:43
7. "Betrayal" – 2:30
8. "Last Mistake" – 3:20
9. "Painless" – 3:16
10. "Pure Hatred" – 1:24
11. "Paradox" – 2:06
12. "Abandonment" – 1:36
13. "Corporal Jigsore Quandary" (Carcass cover) – 5:34

== Personnel ==
- Luke Kenny – vocals, samples, drum programming
- Matt Wilcock – guitar
- Sam Bean – bass, vocals
- Gary Thomas – drums
