= Eve & Adam =

2012 book by Michael Grant and Katherine Applegate

- First edition
- Author: Michael Grant; Katherine Applegate
- Language: English
- Genre: Science fiction, romance
- Publisher: Feiwel and Friends
- Publication date: 2 October 2012
- Publication place: United States
- Media type: Print (hardcover and paperback)
- Pages: 291
- ISBN: 978-1250034199

Eve & Adam is a young adult science fiction romance novel by Michael Grant and Katherine Applegate. It was published in 2012 by Feiwel and Friends.

== Plot summary ==
After being in a car accident, Evening (Eve) is recovering in her mother's research facility, and is suffering from boredom. She is given the task of creating the perfect boy, Adam, by using detailed simulation technologies to be able to bring him to life. Along the way, she is both helped and hindered by Solo, a boy who has been living at the Biotech facility for years and knows many of its secrets.

"Love Sucks and then You Die" is a short story prequel to Eve & Adam.
