= Zerka =

Zerka may refer to:

- Jordan River, Biblical name Zerka
- Zarqa, a town in Jordan
- Monsef Zerka (born 1981), French-born Moroccan footballer
- Zerka T. Moreno, American psychotherapist

== See also ==
- Zerkaa (born 1992), English YouTuber
- Zerker (disambiguation)
