= The Reawakening =

Studio album by The Berzerker
- Released: September 1, 2008
- Genres: Industrial death metal, grindcore
- Length: 36:19
- Label: Self Released

The Berzerker chronology
| Animosity (2007) | The Reawakening (2008) |

The Reawakening is the fifth and final album by the band The Berzerker released in 2008. This was the first album by the band not to be sold in stores after the band left Earache Records.

== Reception ==
- Thrash Hits link

== Track listing ==
1. "Wisdom and Corruption" – 3:50
2. "Unforgotten Force" – 5:17
3. "Caught in the Crossfire" – 3:21
4. "The Deception" - 4:02
5. "Disassembly Line" – 3:27
6. "Evolution of Aggression" – 3:26
7. "Your Final Seconds" – 2:59
8. "Harvesting a Loved One" – 3:35
9. "Internal Examination" – 3:07
10. "Spare Parts" – 3:15
11. "Spare Parts" (Namshubofenki Mix)* – 3:27
12. "Spare Parts" (Bazooka Mix)* - 4:23
13. "Caught In The Crossfire" (Zardonic Mix)* - 3:38
14. "Spare Parts" (Delta 9 Mix)* - 2:36
15. "Caught In The Crossfire" (Stanley Cupid Mix)* - 4:02
16. "Spare Parts" (Frazzbass Mix)* - 4:09
- *Bonus tracks available exclusively in the Digipak Edition

A music video was created for "Internal Examination".

== Personnel ==
- Luke Kenny – vocals, drum programming, synth, samples
- Ed Lacey – guitar, bass
- Martin Germ Bermheden – guitar

=== Live ===
- Luke Kenny – vocals
- Todd Hansen – drums
- Damien Palmer – bass
- Ed Lacey – guitar
- Martin Germ Bermheden – guitar
- Tim Aldridge – guitar
