= The Familiars (novel series) =

Book series by Adam Jay Epstein and Andrew Jacobson

- Cover of the first book in The Familiars series
- The Familiars; The Familiars: Secrets of the Crown; The Familiars: Circle of Heroes; The Familiars: Palace of Dreams
- Author: Adam Jay Epstein; Andrew Jacobson
- Country: United States
- Language: English
- Genre: Fantasy
- Publisher: HarperCollins
- Published: 2010-2013
- Media type: Print (hardcover, paperback); Electronic book

The Familiars is a series of children's fantasy books written by Adam Jay Epstein and Andrew Jacobson. The Familiars is also the title of the first book in the series, featuring familiars, magical animal companions to a wizard or witch. The series consists of 4 books, published between 2010 and 2013 by HarperCollins.

== Books ==
- The Familiars (2010)
- The Familiars: Secrets of the Crown (2011)
- The Familiars: Circle of Heroes (2012)
- The Familiars: Palace of Dreams (2013)

== Characters ==
- Aldwyn, a familiar to Jack, an orphan alley cat. Aldwyn pretended to possess the magical power of telekinesis to escape from Grimslade, a bounty hunter. Aldwyn's ruse turns out to be true when he uses telekinesis to save his friends.
- Skylar, a familiar know-it-all blue jay to Dalton, Skylar can cast illusions. She also dabbles in dark magic, hoping to master necromancy in order to revive her dead sister, Jemma.
- Gilbert, a familiar to Marianne, a hapless tree frog with the ability to see visions of the past, present, and future in pools of water.
- Jack, an apprentice wizard and Aldwyn's loyal, as well as Marianne's younger brother.
- Dalton, an apprentice wizard and Skylar's loyal, as well as the oldest of Kalstaff's three apprentices.
- Marianne, an apprentice witch and Gilbert's loyal, as well as Jack's older sister.
- Kalstaff, an elderly wizard and mentor to Jack, Dalton, and Marianne. Sadly, this wizard died in vain to Paksahara, Queen Loranella's old hare familiar, who was in disguise as Queen Loranella.
- Grimslade, a cruel bounty hunter who is enemies with Aldwyn. However, in the 3rd book, he was willing to help them against Paksahara and her Zombie revolution, which resulted in his death to a Zombie Crocodile.
- Paksahara, an evil hare who possesses the ability to shapeshift and is the former familiar of Queen Loranella. She sought to overthrow humanity and rule Vastia with animals being the magic wielders instead, as they were in ancient times.
- Queen Loranella, the queen of Vastia.
- The Alchemist, an old man with a tortoise familiar named Edan. The two live high up on the Peaks of Kailasa. The Alchemist has used Edan's time powers to complete many potions and consequently has been alive for a very long time.
- Tammy, an orange and white farm cat who helps the familiars and is Aldwyn's love interest.
- Shady, Gilbert's small, but loyal, shadow hound companion.
- Karna, a pocket dragon. She was supposed to replace Aldwyn if he had taken another path to run from Grimslade.
- Lothar, the leader of the wolverines. He is one of the seven descendants but after he escaped because of not being in alliance with the Three, Galleon took his place.

== Plot synopses ==
=== The Familiars (2010) ===
The Familiars
- Publication date: September 7, 2010
- Pages: 360
- ISBN: 978-0-06-196108-3
- Followed by: The Familiars: Secrets of the Crown

Aldwyn is an ordinary alley cat, who accidentally enters a shop while attempting to escape from a bounty hunter named Grimslade. He discovers that it is a shop full of magical animals, who are all prepared to become a wizard's familiar - that is to say, a magical animal companion. Just then, a young wizard-in-training, Jack, enters the shop with his mentor, the powerful wizard Kalstaff, to choose a familiar. Aldwyn was chosen, even though he could not be a true familiar as he was not magical (Jack did not know that of course). They travelled back to Stone Runlet, Kalstaff's dwelling, together, and Aldwyn met the other two wizards-in-training, Dalton and Marianne, as well as their respective familiars, Skylar and Gilbert.

Just when Aldwyn had settled down and was finally content, with an omen of three shooting stars, portending that three young wizards from Stone Runlet would save the world, things took a dark turn. That night, Queen Loranella, an old ally of Kalstaff as well as sovereign of the kingdom appeared. She turned on her old friend Kalstaff, killing him, then kidnapped Jack, Marianne and Dalton, leaving the three familiars behind.

Aldwyn, Skylar and Gilbert, determined to save their loyals (the human companion of a familiar), go on a quest to free them. They experience many trials on their quest, vanquish a witch, defeat a mountain troll, pay a visit to Gilbert's homeland, and encounter the great Mountain Alchemist, who, along with Queen Loranella and Kalstaff, were the first 'prophesied three' 60 years ago. Finally, just before the third sunset when the protection spells around their three loyals fade, which will allow Queen Loranella to finally kill them, the three familiars arrive. Upon arrival, they realize that their real enemy is the Queen Loranella's familiar, a hare named Paksahara, who had imprisoned the real queen, and shifted into her likeliness. They also become aware that murdering Kalstaff and kidnapping their loyals was also really done by Paksahara under the guise of Queen Loranella. As the three familiars make desperate endeavors to rescue their loyals, Aldwyn discovers that he is in fact magical and possesses the power of telekinesis. With his newfound power, Aldwyn and his fellow familiars defeat Paksahara, who ultimately escapes. Aldwyn, Skylar and Gilbert free their loyals, and discover that the three real wizards that the shooting stars foretold are Aldwyn, Skylar and Gilbert, the three animal wizards.

=== The Familiars: Secrets of the Crown (2011) ===
The Familiars: Secrets of the Crown
- Publication date: September 6, 2011
- Pages: 384
- ISBN: 978-0-06-196111-3
- Preceded by: The Familiars
- Followed by: The Familiars: Circle of Heroes

As their old mentor Kalstaff was dead, the three loyals and familiars are completing their studies with Sorceress Edna. All of a sudden, when human magic mysteriously disappears from the land, Queen Loranella is rendered powerless, and is thus unable to stop the impending army of the Dead led by Paksahara which is about to invade the land. Hence, it is once more up to the familiars to save the land of Vastia.

In order to do so, they must find the Shifting Fortress from which Paksahara is casting her magic. However, the Shifting Fortress never appears in the same place twice, and the only way to access it is to find the Snow Leopard's Crown. Following the clues hidden in a nursery rhyme, the familiars find their way to the sacred Tree Temple where they discovered that the Spheris, the globe which would lead them towards the Crown, had been taken three years ago by none other than Aldwyn's father, Baxley. Desiring to find out all they can about Baxley, and bearing the knowledge that the future of the Queendom of Vastia depended on it, the three travel to Maidenmere, Aldwyn's birthplace. They discover that the pride leader of the Maidenmere Bicoloured Cats, masters of telekinesis, Malvern, is Aldwyn's own uncle. Malvern introduces Aldwyn to a kind of magic which permits him to see the last footsteps of his father - which would end either when he found his father, or when he arrived at the last place Baxley had been before dying.

Guided by the footsteps of his father and the clues, the familiars face many dangers before arriving at their destination - the place where the Snow Leopard's crown lies. They found out that the crown is really a circle formed by seven ancient stones, each of which speaks the name of an animal upon contact. In order to summon the shifting fortress, the familiars have to bring the seven animals together. Then they find out Malvern is a traitor working for Paksahara. Malvern had drowned Aldwyn's mother and tricked his father, Baxley, into dying. Malvern was killed by a blast from Paksahara when she tried to shoot Aldwyn but missed instead. The book ends with the familiars, with the hired help of the bounty hunter Grimslade, prepare to seek out the seven animals, as Paksahara's Dead Army begins their invasion on Vastia.

=== The Familiars: Circle of Heroes (2012) ===
The Familiars: Circle of Heroes
- Publication date: September 4, 2012
- Pages: 336
- ISBN: 978-0-06-196114-4
- Preceded by: The Familiars: Secrets of the Crown
- Followed by: The Familiars: Palace of Dreams

Human magic in Vastia is still gone, and as the familiars begin their journey to find the seven animals needed to summon the Shifting Fortress, an army of the Dead besieges the city of Bridgetower, destroying the first of three glyph stones, the only places where the Shifting Fortress can be called from. They escape, but are forced to leave the bounty hunter, Grimslade, behind. The familiars retain the map he made to find the animals, however, and use it to start their journey, leaving their loyals, Jack, Marianne, and Dalton, in the cellar of Stone Runlet to keep them safe.

Traveling to different places, the familiars collect all animals needed to summon the fortress. During this time, two of the three glyph stones fall, Aldwyn learns the current whereabouts of his twin sister, Yeardly, and has another encounter with his traitorous uncle, Malvern, who has been brought back to life due to Paksahara's summoning of the Dead.

Heading to the final glyph stone outside of Bronzhaven, the familiars and the seven animals needed to summon the Shifting Fortress encounter a brutal battle between Paksahara's zombie forces and Queen Loranella's troops. They manage to make it to the third glyph stone, and summon the Shifting Fortress. The familiars and a few of their animal friends journey inside to stop Paksahara. After being accosted in the fortress by Dead warriors, the familiars' friends stay behind to fend them off, leaving Aldwyn, Skylar, and Gilbert to continue on.

Once more, Aldwyn encounters his uncle, but puts an end to him this time. They continue to the room where Paksahara waits, resulting in a deadly battle. In the midst, Gilbert attempts to summon fire and successfully completes a spell, showing the improvement of his magic. Paksahara takes advantage of this distraction to disguise herself as Gilbert.

Aldwyn discovers he has inherited his mother's telepathic powers as he and Skylar struggle to find the real Gilbert, and he uses this power to determine which frog is Gilbert, giving Skylar the opportunity to kill Paksahara. The familiars release human magic back into Vastia, which helps turn the tide of the battle raging outside Bronzhaven, resulting in the success of Loranella's army. However, Paksahara is brought back to life by the spell she used to summon the Dead. The familiars vanquish her once more by throwing her to the vultures that swarm above the battleground, who destroy her carcass.

Later on, the familiars are reunited with their loyals. Aldwyn, Skylar, and Gilbert are thanked by the queen and her new council, which now consists of a mixture of humans and animals. They are immortalized in a picture in a stained glass window. As they study it, Gilbert tells Aldwyn about his latest puddle vision: that their adventures aren't over yet.

=== The Familiars: Palace of Dreams (2013) ===
The Familiars: Palace of Dreams
- Author: Adam Jay Epstein &Andrew Jacobson
- Cover artist: Peter Chan & Kei Acedera
- Publication date: December 23, 2013
- Pages: 323
- ISBN: 978-0-06-212029-8
- Preceded by: The Familiars: Circle of Heroes

The Three are invited to Queen Loranella's birthday party, whence they bestow a gift for her. Queen Loranella tried it on, but the necklace cursed her, putting her to sleep in the Wander. The Three are then framed for cursing her. They must find a potion that can bring her back, and they must find it soon, before she passes into the Tommorowlife.

They go to the Turn to find an answer, and the potion ingredients were said to be found in Kalstaff's belongings. They turn to Turnbuckle Academy to find the ingredients, but they must go without getting found out by anyone, and more importantly their loyals. They peer into numerous classrooms as they try to find the library. After being discovered and chased, they flee into the Dreamworld.

At the Dreamworld, they meet a realmwalker, who guides them through the world. They pass a castle full of puzzles and set of to the Palace of Dreams. When they arrive, they receive the ingredients to the potion that will save Queen Loranella from the queen herself - in a dream.

== Film ==
In September 2010, it was revealed that Sony Pictures Animation will adapt The Familiars into a 3D animated feature film, with Doug Sweetland set to direct it. According to the books' authors, the film was scheduled to be released in 2014 but it got cancelled. Fergal Reilly joined Sweetland to co-direct the film, but in 2013, he left to co-direct The Angry Birds Movie. In January 2013, when it was announced that Sweetland will direct a 2015 film for Warner Bros. (that would eventually become Storks from Warner Animation Group in 2016), Sony Pictures Animation responded that "The Familiars is cancelled." Epstein and Jacobson said in September 2013 in an interview.

In March 2016, Adam Jay Epstein confirmed that the film will be made at another studio.
