= Michael Grant (author, born 1954) =

American author of young adult fiction (born 1954)

- Born: Michael Reynolds; July 26, 1954 (age 72); Los Angeles, California, U.S.
- Occupation: Novelist
- Spouse: K. A. Applegate
- Children: 2
- Writing career
- Period: 1997–present
- Genres: Young adult, Supernatural, Science Fiction, Horror
- Website: www.michaelgrantbooks.co.uk

Michael Reynolds (born July 26, 1954) is an American author of young adult fiction writing under the name Michael Grant. He has written over 160 books, though most are as a co-author with his wife, Katherine Applegate. Together they have written the Animorphs and the Everworld series, as well as the Making Out series. Grant is the sole author of the Gone series, the BZRK series, the Messenger of Fear series, and the Front Lines trilogy. His top selling book is Gone.

His writing influences include Stephen King, Bill Bryson, Patrick O'Brien, J. R. R. Tolkien, Dan Simmons, and Raymond Chandler

== Early life ==
Grant was raised in a military family, attending ten schools in five states as well as three schools in France. He became a writer in part because "it was one of the few jobs that wouldn't tie him down to a specific location. He has lived in almost 50 homes in 14 states."

Grant has described growing up poor, in trailer parks, and dropping out of school at age 15. He then got a job at Toys R Us, with a fake ID he obtained by signing up for the draft (during the Vietnam War). After three months, he quit and traveled to Europe for three months.

== Personal life ==
Grant lives in California with his wife, Katherine Applegate, and their two children, and their many pets. He currently resides in Tiburón, California.

== Bibliography ==
=== Animorphs series ===
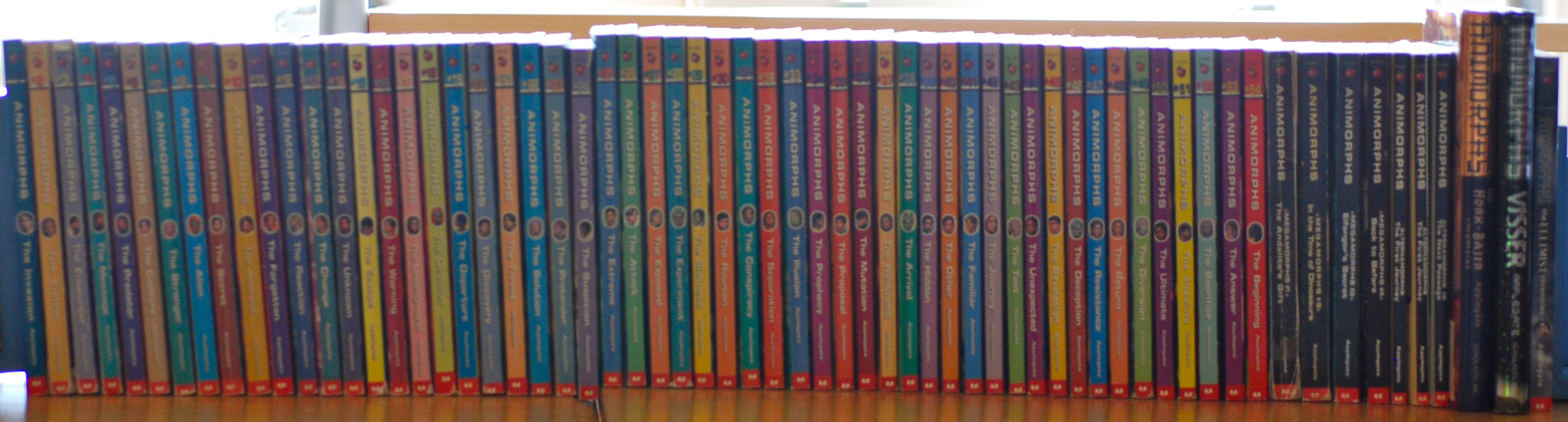
Collection of Animorphs books.

Companion books

- Megamorphs 1: The Andalite's Gift (1997)
- Megamorphs 2: In the Time of Dinosaurs (1998)
- Megamorphs 3: Elfangor's Secret (1999)
- Megamorphs 4: Back to Before (2000)
- The Andalite Chronicles (1997)
- The Hork-Bajir Chronicles (1998)
- The Ellimist Chronicles (2000)
- Visser (2000)
- Alternamorphs 1: The First Journey (1999) (ghostwritten)
- Alternamorphs 2: The Next Passage (2000) (ghostwritten)

=== Everworld series ===
- Search for Senna (1999)
- Land of Loss (1999)
- Enter the Enchanted (1999)
- Realm of the Reaper (2000)
- Discover the Destroyer (2000)
- Fear the Fantastic (2000)
- Gateway to the Gods (2000)
- Brave the Betrayal (2000)
- Inside the Illusion (2000)
- Understand the Unknown (2000)
- Mystify the Magician (2001)
- Entertain the End (2001)

=== Remnants series ===
- The Mayflower Project (2001)
- Destination Unknown (2001)
- Them (2001)
- Nowhere Land (2002)
- Mutation (2002)
- Breakdown (2002)
- Isolation (2002)
- Mother, May I? (2002)
- No Place Like Home (2002)
- Lost and Found (2003)
- Dream Storm (2003)
- Aftermath (2003)
- Survival (2003)
- Begin Again (2003)

=== Gone series ===
==== Gone: Series One ====
- Gone (2008)
- Hunger (2009)
- Lies (2010)
- Plague (2011)
- Fear (2012)
- Light (2013)

==== Monster trilogy: Series Two ====
- Monster (2017)
- Villain (2018)
- Hero (2019)

=== The Magnificent 12 series ===
- The Call (2011)
- The Trap (2012)
- The Key (2013)
- The Power (2013)

=== BZRK series ===
- BZRK (2012)
- BZRK II: Reloaded (2013)
- BZRK III: Apocalypse (2014)
- BZRK: Origins (2013)

=== Messenger of Fear duology ===
- Messenger of Fear (2014)
- The Tattooed Heart (2015)

==== Short stories ====
- The Snake: A Messenger of Fear Story (2014: online only)

=== Front Lines trilogy ===
- Front Lines (2016)
- Silver Stars (2017)
- Purple Hearts (2018)

=== A David Mitre Thriller series ===
- A Sudden Death in Cyprus (2018)
- An Artful Assassin in Amsterdam (2019)

=== Stand-alone novels ===
- Eve & Adam with Katherine Applegate (2012)
