= Gone (novel series) =

Young adult book series by Michael Grant

- First edition cover of Gone
- Series One; Gone; Hunger; Lies; Plague; Fear; Light; Series Two; Monster; Villain; Hero
- Author: Michael Grant
- Country: United States
- Language: English
- Genre: Supernatural; Superhero; Horror; Science fiction; Dystopia; Thriller
- Publisher: HarperCollins
- Published: 2008–2013 (Season One); 2017–2019 (Season Two)
- Media type: Print (hardcover and paperback)
- No. of books: 9

Gone is a bestselling book series written by Michael Grant.

The series is centered on the fictional Southern California town of Perdido Beach, in which every human aged 15 and older vanishes. The town and surrounding areas become encased by an opaque, impenetrable dome 20 miles in diameter, with the physical barrier burning to the touch. The novels feature many of its inhabitants developing supernatural powers. The books follow the exploits of the protagonist/hero, Sam Temple, as he battles antagonists Caine Soren, Drake Merwin, and Diana Ladris as well as a mysterious, malevolent creature, known as the Darkness or the Gaiaphage (gai-uh-fage) (derived from Gaia, a Greek personification of the Earth, and "phage", from the Greek φαγεῖν phagein "to devour").

The first novel in this series, titled Gone, was published in 2008. The second book, Hunger, was released a year later, followed by the third book, Lies, on May 4, 2010. The fourth book, Plague, was released on April 5, 2011. The fifth book, Fear, was released on April 3, 2012, in the United States and the United Kingdom, although it was released as early as March 23 in Australia and Hong Kong. The sixth book, Light, was released on April 2, 2013. The series – "a fun, no-brainer read directed towards teenagers" – has been hailed as "ridiculously popular" and "a sensation in the young adult world".

A planned Monster Trilogy, also known as Season Two, began on October 17, 2017, with the release of Monster. It was set four years later from the events that took place in the other books. Villain was released on October 18, 2018, and Hero was released on October 1, 2019.

== Novels ==
=== Gone ===
The story starts with the sudden disappearance of everybody aged 15 or older from the town of Perdido Beach, causing extreme confusion and chaos amongst those remaining in the town. Students Sam Temple, Quinn Gaither, Astrid Ellison, and Edilio Escobar discover an impermeable barrier cutting Perdido Beach off from the outside world; the area within the barrier is subsequently nicknamed "Fallout Alley Youth Zone", shortened to "the FAYZ". Unknown to the others, Sam had earlier discovered his superhuman ability to fire light from his hands capable of burning objects when he is afraid; after reading a journal entry by his mother Connie, a nurse at the nearby Coates Academy, Sam begins to suspect a connection to the disappearances and the barrier. While looking for Astrid's autistic four-year-old brother "Little" Pete at a nuclear power plant outside of town, the quartet discovers that the barrier's boundaries correspond to predicted radiation patterns in the case of a meltdown. Pete is revealed to have superhuman abilities in an incident where he chokes Sam, and that also exposes Sam's powers to the group, who agree to keep it secret.

Upon the group's return to Perdido Beach, they encounter vehicles bringing students from Coates Academy, led by the charismatic Caine Soren. Caine restores order to Perdido Beach with the aid of his confidante Diana Ladris and enforcer Drake Merwin, but Sam and Astrid are suspicious of Caine's motives. Caine (revealed to have the power of telekinesis), Diana (who has the ability to determine the strength of others' powers), and Drake (a violent sadist with no powers of his own) discover that when inhabitants of the FAYZ turn 15, they are confronted by something they desire before vanishing, a phenomenon nicknamed "the poof", but can remain in the FAYZ by resisting whatever tempts them. Caine also discovers that he and Sam are twin brothers that were separated at birth, with Sam remaining with their mother, a revelation that deeply upsets Caine. Quinn, who has started hanging out with Caine's friends, tells Caine of Sam's powers. Feeling threatened, Caine enlists his crew, including local bully Charles "Orc" Merriman and his lackey Howard Bassem, to kidnap Sam, Astrid (who has begun dating Sam) and Pete. Quinn frees Sam, and Astrid and Pete are freed from Drake by Pete's abilities. Caine instructs Drake to kill Astrid and Pete, but Sam saves her. Sam, Astrid, Quinn, Pete, and Edilio escape town.

Meanwhile, teenager Lana Arwen Lazar is injured in a car crash after her grandfather disappears from the FAYZ. Lana discovers she has healing abilities and uses them to recover. Lana encounters a pack of coyotes that can talk. The coyotes take her to a mineshaft, where an entity the coyotes call "the Darkness" lives. Lana encounters Sam's group and together they escape the coyotes, only to be captured by Drake and taken to Coates Academy. Caine has their hands sealed in concrete, as he has discovered that the superhuman abilities are yielded by hand. Astrid coerces Pete into using his abilities to free Sam's group and the other students held prisoner; Caine, Diana and Drake flee, with Sam burning Drake's arm off in the process. Sam's group and the Coates students - amongst them Taylor, who can teleport, Brianna "The Breeze", who can run at superhuman speeds, and Dekka, who can control gravity - return to Perdido Beach. Drake infiltrates the town and kidnaps Lana, believing she can regenerate his arm. Meanwhile, Orc and Howard decide to escape town to avoid Sam, but encounter Drake and the coyotes, who are still seeking Lana for the Darkness' own ends. Orc is mauled by the coyotes, while Howard convinces the coyotes to bring Drake and Lana to the mineshaft before fleeing. The Darkness gives Drake command of the coyotes and coerces Lana to heal Drake's arm, which regenerates as a whip-like tentacle. Drake returns to Coates Academy and Caine prepares to attack Perdido Beach before he "poofs". Unknown to Caine, Diana sends his subordinate "Computer" Jack, who is concealing his own ability of super-strength, to Perdido Beach to tell Sam how to escape the "poof".

At Perdido Beach, Sam anticipates Caine's attack and makes plans to defend the town. He sends Edilio to the power plant to recover a cache of guns, as well as security footage from the time the FAYZ was created. Sam shows the footage to Astrid, revealing that Pete had created the FAYZ in order to prevent the power plant from going into meltdown. The battle begins with Caine's goons distracting Sam while Drake and the coyotes take a class of preschoolers hostage, along with their carer Mary Terrafino. Sam, Quinn, Edilio and the formerly captive Coates kids join forces to rescue the preschoolers; Orc, who survived the coyote attack and had subsequently transformed into a tall, gravel-skinned being, fights Drake to a stalemate. Caine confronts Sam before Jack can tell Sam how to survive the "poof", and the two soon disappear as they turn 15. The duo encounters a vision of Connie, who invites them to return to her. Both boys refuse, with Sam declaring that he has work to do in the FAYZ. Connie transforms into a manifestation of the Darkness, which gloats that Caine will come to it willingly, before disappearing. The boys return to the FAYZ; Sam is the first to recover and coerces Caine and the Coates students to retreat, but Caine declares he will return. Later, student Albert Hillsborough organizes a Thanksgiving dinner for the town and Sam encourages the residents of the FAYZ to stick together. Meanwhile, the coyotes' pack leader takes Caine to the Darkness.

=== Hunger ===
Three months after the end of Gone, Sam has become mayor of Perdido Beach, but struggles with the responsibilities of protecting the town. Food supplies are dwindling, exacerbated by the presence of mutated carnivorous worms called "zekes" that prevent access to crop fields and only partially alleviated by Quinn's idea to begin fishing the nearby ocean. Other children are beginning to discover their mutant abilities, including Duck Zhang, who can control his density, and Hunter Lefkowitz, who can emit deadly microwave rays. Little Pete is also starting to reveal more of his powers, including the ability to create life. Tensions between mutants and non-mutants escalate after Hunter accidentally kills his roommate Harry with his powers during a confrontation between Hunter and the anti-mutant Zil Sperry. Zil and his posse, dubbing themselves the "Human Crew", capture and attempt to lynch Hunter before being forced to disperse by Orc. Albert, having learned from Lana of a cache of gold near the mineshaft where the Darkness lurks, travels there with Quinn and Lana to obtain the gold with the intention of using it to make currency for the FAYZ. Lana, traumatized by her encounter with the Darkness, abandons them to attempt to kill the Darkness by detonating LPG in the mineshaft. The Darkness, which calls itself the gaiaphage and whose physical form is revealed as a mass of green crystalline particles, subdues Lana.

At Coates Academy, Caine wakes after having spent the past three months in a fugue state following his encounter with the gaiaphage and makes plans to seize control of the nuclear power plant. While performing reconnaissance, Drake captures Orsay Pettijohn, a mutant with the ability to view people's dreams. Diana manipulates Jack, taking refuge in Perdido Beach, to help Caine in accessing the computers at the plant. Caine and his crew assault the power plant and shut off power to Perdido Beach; Sam, having realized Caine's plan, rushes to confront him. Caine realizes that he has been manipulated by the gaiaphage, as it needs radioactive uranium from the power plant to "feed". Forced to submit to the gaiaphage's will, Caine takes the uranium to the mineshaft, damaging the reactor and permanently cutting off power in the FAYZ, and leaving Drake behind to stall Sam. Caine also sends Bug, a mutant with the ability of camouflage, to bring Orsay to the mineshaft in order to determine the gaiaphage's objectives. Drake coerces Sam into allowing himself to be tortured by threatening to trigger a reactor meltdown. Sam is rescued by Brianna, who severs part of Drake's tentacle, but Sam is left close to death; Drake retreats to join up with Caine.

Bug tells the children of Perdido Beach Caine's plan in exchange for food. Edilio takes Orsay to the mineshaft, and Orsay relays to the children of Perdido Beach the gaiaphage's desire to "feed". Astrid speculates that the gaiaphage came to Earth in a meteor strike that hit the power plant 13 years prior, that the radiation both sustains the gaiaphage and has caused the mutations, and that the gaiaphage has been manipulating Pete, Lana, and Caine with the aim of creating indestructible physical forms for itself capable of resisting the children of the FAYZ. Edilio and Dekka travel to the mineshaft to find Lana under the influence of the gaiaphage. Lana shoots and critically wounds Edilio before retreating into the mineshaft, while Dekka is attacked by coyotes. Caine, Drake, Diana and Jack arrive, soon followed by Sam, Quinn, Brianna, and Duck (Sam having reasoned that the gaiaphage is unprepared for Duck's abilities). Drake, now loyal to the gaiaphage instead of Caine, attacks Diana. Enraged, Caine defies the gaiaphage to throw Drake and the uranium into the mineshaft before collapsing it, but realises that Lana must be rescued to save Diana. Using Duck's powers to tunnel into the mineshaft, Caine and Sam confront the gaiaphage, which is "feeding" on the uranium. Duck sacrifices himself by having Caine throw him at the gaiaphage while he uses his power, creating a void that sucks in the gaiaphage. Lana is freed from the gaiaphage's influence and heals the children of their injuries, and Caine and Diana depart.

Back at Perdido Beach, Sam steps down as mayor and shares responsibilities with a council, though many still sympathize with the Human Crew. The children gain access to the crops by feeding the zekes mutant "blue bats" previously discovered by Duck. Hunter, left brain-damaged as a result of his ordeal, is exiled from Perdido Beach. Brittney Donegal, a girl seemingly killed in Caine's attack on the power plant, is buried in the graveyard in the town plaza; unknown to the rest of the children, Brittney has the power of immortality and remains conscious, with a mysterious slug (Drake's severed tentacle) attached to her arm.

=== Lies ===
Four months after Hunger, Sam is still traumatized by his torture by Drake. His fears increase after the Human Crew abduct Jill, a young girl with siren-like mutant abilities, and dump her in an empty grave which Sam and Edilio realise was previously occupied by Brittney; it is implied that Sam and Edilio know the slug on Brittney's arm was Drake's severed tentacle. Jill is taken in by Orsay and her helper, a mysterious girl named Nerezza unfamiliar to the children of Perdido Beach. Orsay, whose powers have grown so that she can contact people outside the FAYZ through dreams, begins telling children that they can escape the FAYZ through the "poof". After Sam is unsuccessful in concealing Orsay's claims from the council, Astrid convinces the other councillors to tell Perdido Beach that Orsay is lying, despite not being able to disprove Orsay's claims. Sam's deception causes a rift between him and Astrid and prompt their break-up. Brittney reappears in Perdido Beach, guided by visions of her deceased brother Tanner that give her cryptic warnings of a "demon"; her reappearance is soon followed by the discovery of several bodies who show signs of being whipped to death.

At Coates, Caine and his remaining followers learns of San Francisco de Sales, a private island owned by Hollywood power couple Jennifer Brattle and Todd Chance located within the FAYZ, and Caine makes plans to relocate to the island. To this end he reaches out to Zil and the Human Crew, arranging for the Human Crew to set fire to Perdido Beach to create a distraction for Caine and his group to steal boats from the town's marina. While responding to the fire, Sam is attacked by Drake and flees Perdido Beach in terror. Caine and those he deems useful - Diana, Bug, and a cruel mutant named Penny with the ability to create illusions - make it to San Francisco de Sales, which they discover is still occupied by the Brattle-Chances' adopted children. The Brattle-Chances, knowing that they will eventually run out of supplies, drug Caine's group and attempt to flee to Perdido Beach by helicopter. Caine wakes and uses his abilities to stop the Brattle-Chances, but is forced to release them to stop Diana attempting suicide.

In the aftermath of the fire, Albert hosts a cookout to raise morale, while Brianna brings Sam back to town. Astrid, realizing that the children no longer respect her, uses her authority as a council member to pass laws aimed at maintaining order in the town before resigning her position. Nerezza convinces Zil and the Human Crew to launch another attack at the cookout, while Drake reappears and begins attacking the children. Nerezza attempts to kill Pete before being stopped by Astrid, who realizes that the gaiaphage had used Pete to create Nerezza by manipulating Pete into thinking he was creating a protagonist for his game console. Mary attempts to kill the preschoolers by having them jump off a cliff as she turns 15, having been influenced by Orsay and Nerezza to believe that their deaths will allow them to reawaken outside of the FAYZ. The children are saved by Brianna and Dekka, the latter of whom also kills Zil, but Mary disappears. Nerezza, who has killed Orsay, uses Jill's abilities in an attempt to prevent the children from fighting back, but is distracted by the arrival of the Brattle-Chances. Sam destroys Nerezza and attempts to destroy Drake, who now has the ability of regeneration, but ultimately relents when Drake transforms into Brittney and instead has her locked in a basement with Orc keeping guard. Pete's game console is destroyed in the showdown at Clifftop; in his anguish, Pete briefly causes the FAYZ barrier to disappear, giving Perdido Beach a brief glimpse of the outside world.

Throughout the book, many characters are mentioned as having contracted a flu-like disease, foreshadowing events in Plague.

=== Plague ===
Perdido Beach is now run in all but name by Albert, whose introduction of money and paid labor to the town has placed him in a position of considerable power. With water supplies dwindling, Albert sends Sam, Dekka, Jack and Taylor to find a new water source at Lake Tramonto, on the far side of the FAYZ. Meanwhile, a plague that causes those infected to cough up their insides spreads through Perdido Beach, and the town's inhabitants are instructed not to leave their homes to stop the spread. On the way to the lake, Sam's group encounters Hunter, who has become infested with parasitic bugs which have begun to eat him from the inside out. At Hunter's request, Sam uses his powers to euthanize him, but in doing so releases bugs that are invulnerable to his abilities. A coyote then leads the group to the creatures that are causing the infections. The group attacks the creatures, and Dekka becomes infested in the process. Meanwhile, Drake escapes his prison after Orc becomes drunk. He makes his way to the mineshaft and is met by the bugs, which clear the way into the mineshaft. Drake transforms into Brittney, who discovers that the Gaiaphage was an alien virus intended to seed planets with life before mutating due to exposure to radiation and human DNA. With Brittney now accepting the gaiaphage as her god, Drake and the bugs split into two armies to attack Sam and Perdido Beach. Orc, ashamed of his actions, takes refuge at Coates with Astrid, who believes that killing Pete will end the FAYZ and worries that the other children will kill him.

Sam's group arrive at a nearby military airbase and encounter a lone boy, Toto, whose mutant power is to tell truth from lies. Sam's group discover that the military was tracking the various mutants before the FAYZ began. They also find a train containing valuable supplies of food, as well as a train car full of handheld missile launchers. Travelling on to the lake, Sam and his group are confronted by Drake and the bugs, which have grown to the size of SUVs. The group escapes back to the military base, with Sam sending Jack to Perdido Beach to either retrieve Caine from San Francisco de Sales or throw Pete to the bugs, assuming that Pete will be induced to use his abilities in response. Dekka attempts to use her abilities to bring the missiles to the power plant and then on to Perdido Beach, but the plan is thwarted when she begins to succumb to her infestation and drops the container. Perdido Beach erupts into chaos with the knowledge that the bugs are approaching, most mutants too far away to help, Albert near death after being attacked by the remnants of the Human Crew, and the plague having hospitalized many kids. Independently of Sam, Edilio instructs Quinn to bring Caine to Perdido Beach, as he has the power to kill the bugs. Caine accepts the challenge, hoping to become king after saving the town.

The bugs arrive in Perdido Beach, and Caine teams up with Brianna to destroy most of the army attacking the town, though many children are killed in the battle. Quinn rescues Sam, Toto and Dekka and brings them back to Perdido Beach, with Sam forced to cut Dekka open to stop the bugs devouring Dekka. Jack encounters Astrid and Orc at Coates, soon joined by Drake and his bugs. When threatened by Drake, Astrid throws Pete to the insects, who realizes the danger and vanishes both the insects and himself, but the FAYZ barrier remains.

Caine installs himself as king of Perdido Beach, though it is clear that Albert remains the real power behind the throne. Sam forms a community at Lake Tramonto with a third of Perdido Beach deciding to follow him. To Caine's shock, Diana decides to come with Sam, having become sick of Caine's constant need for power, and reveals that she is pregnant with Caine's child. Meanwhile, it is revealed that Pete's disembodied consciousness has survived the encounter with the bugs.

=== Fear ===
Four months after the end of Plague, Sam's new community at Lake Tramonto is flourishing. However, Sam discovers that the missile container has been booby-trapped, and suspects that Caine has already claimed the missiles. Astrid has abandoned Sam to live alone in the woods, still guilty over sacrificing Pete and unaware of his survival. Pete experiments with his new state of existence by tampering with the genetic makeup of the inhabitants of the FAYZ, resulting in several gruesome deaths. Amongst his victims is Taylor, who survives her mutation but is transformed into a gold-skinned non-mammalian creature.

Astrid and several other FAYZ inhabitants discover that the energy barrier has begun to turn black, prompting Astrid to seek Sam out at Lake Tramonto and rekindle their relationship. Sam sends a letter to Caine offering to use his powers to provide light to Perdido Beach. Meanwhile, Drake and the coyotes are sent by the gaiaphage to bring the pregnant Diana to its cave. Drake allows the coyotes to eat Howard when they cross paths on the way to Lake Tramonto. This is witnessed by Sam's messenger, who instead runs back to Lake Tramonto to raise the alarm. At night, Astrid clandestinely travels to Perdido Beach alone to bring Sam's offer of aid. Meanwhile, Albert decides to flee to San Francisco de Sales to survive an anticipated societal collapse resulting from the barrier darkening; it is revealed that he has hidden the missiles on the island without telling Caine.

In Perdido Beach, Caine sentences Cigar, one of Quinn's fishermen, to a day being tortured by Penny and her illusions. Cigar claws his own eyes out as a result of Penny's torture, prompting Quinn and his fishermen to go on strike and demand Penny's exile from Perdido Beach. Lana attempts to regenerate Cigar's eyes and is partially successful; however, Cigar is only able to perceive people's auras, but soon realises that he is able to see and communicate with Pete. Penny drugs Caine and encases his hands in concrete, preventing the use of his powers, but is infuriated when the frightened children of Perdido Beach clamor for his release rather than accept her leadership. Lana coerces Penny into leaving town. Astrid encounters Cigar, who reveals that Pete is alive, but Cigar is eaten by zekes soon afterwards. Through mental communication with Pete, Astrid learns that the barrier is connected to the gaiaphage and the gaiaphage needs a host body - Diana's baby - to channel its abilities. Drake takes Diana captive and brings her to the mineshaft, where they encounter Penny. Diana gives birth to her baby, which is possessed by the gaiaphage. The baby, whom Diana names Gaia, shows signs of possessing several powers, including Sam's light generation and Lana's healing abilities.

Outside the FAYZ, Sam and Caine's mother, Connie Temple, has become one of the spokespeople for the families of Perdido Beach. Connie struggles with her guilt about knowing of Sam and Caine's abilities before the creation of the FAYZ. Connie learns that the army plans to nuke the barrier. She and the other children's families attempt to stop the explosion by alerting the media and the other families, but the military finds that the barrier has prevented them from stopping the detonation.

Drake, Diana, Penny and a rapidly developing Gaia make for the barrier, which Gaia intends to destroy so she can escape into the outside world. They are intercepted by Sam and Caine; Caine kills Penny, prompting Gaia to attempt to kill Caine with her own telekinetic abilities. When Sam tries to destroy Gaia with his light (concurrently to the nuclear detonation), the barrier suddenly becomes transparent, allowing Connie and everyone else gathered outside the barrier to witness the confrontation. Gaia flees, followed by Diana and Drake. In the aftermath, Sam and Astrid are reunited with their parents, and communication begins between the FAYZ and the outside world.

=== Light ===
Two days after Fear, the inhabitants of the FAYZ have become distracted by the outside world and lose interest in their duties, which leads to Quinn returning to San Francisco de Sales to get Albert, as he is the only one who can get everyone back to work. Brianna gives an interview to a news station that reveals the level of violence experienced by the children of the FAYZ. Annoyed at Brianna, Sam and Astrid send her to search for Gaia, Diana, and Drake. Brianna encounters Drake foraging for food for Gaia; she dismembers him and scatters his parts throughout the FAYZ, keeping his head in a chest below the boats on Lake Tramonto.

Gaia schemes to kill the FAYZ residents in order to prevent Pete from fighting her by inhabiting another person's body. Gaia and Diana spot two young men on the other side of the barrier; Gaia uses her power to briefly remove the barrier, causing one of the men, Alex Mayle, to fall through. Gaia removes and eats Alex's arm and informs Alex that she will use him as food. Intimidated, Diana and Alex follow Gaia to Lake Tramonto. Diana escapes and warns the community, but Gaia appears and slaughters most of the community before being forced to retreat by Brianna. Sam and Caine join forces to kill Gaia and rescue Diana. Sam and Caine find Gaia, and their efforts to kill her result in Caine being taken hostage and Sam heavily injured, before he is rescued by Taylor and Lana.

The kids regroup at Perdido Beach and discuss their next move. It is revealed that Gaia, though possessing every power of every living person in the FAYZ, loses that power when the person dies. Sam contemplates whether he must sacrifice himself in order to stop Gaia. Meanwhile, Alex brings Drake's head to Gaia; she decapitates Alex, attaches Drake's head to his body, and replaces Alex's missing arm with another tentacle. Gaia attacks Perdido Beach and kills Brianna. Jack is also killed by a stray bullet and Sam is taken prisoner. Drake captures Astrid and begins to torture her, but Astrid incapacitates him and escapes. With the situation desperate, Caine retrieves Albert's missiles and launches them at Gaia. Orc, who was fighting Gaia at the time, is killed in the blast, but Gaia survives. Realizing that there is only one option left, Caine allows Pete's consciousness to inhabit his body at the cost of his own life. Pete fights Gaia, with each destroying each other in the process, as well as the barrier. While the kids flee Perdido Beach, Sam returns alone to confront Drake after receiving a firearm from Lana. Sam finds that he has lost his ability to shoot light, but when Drake attacks he finds that his immortality and Gaia's ability to graft his head onto Alex's body has also been nullified, resulting in Drake's apparent demise.

The remaining kids reunite with their families and mourn their losses. Connie tells Sam how Caine and Sam were fraternal twins, fathered by the man whose DNA had merged with the gaiaphage, and becomes distant from Sam. Edilio is forced to go into hiding to avoid being deported back to Honduras, and comes out to his family after learning that his boyfriend Roger survived the massacre at Lake Tramonto. Albert gains the attention of every major business in the world, and does an advertisement for McDonald's in Perdido Beach. Lana returns to her family in Vegas. Sam is targeted by prosecutors intending to bring him to trial for his actions in the FAYZ, and escapes hospital with Quinn's help. Astrid, Todd Chance and Jennifer Brattle hold a press conference and Astrid reveals that Caine had written a confession note prior to his death claiming that he was controlling the children of the FAYZ and was responsible for their actions. Sam crashes the conference and is reunited with Astrid. With Caine's confession muddying the waters and footage of Sam and Astrid's reunion going viral, public opinion forces Sam's release. Astrid decides to write a book about life in the FAYZ and signs off the movie rights to the Brattle-Chances. With the money, Astrid buys a house for herself and Sam next door to Quinn's family. After the survivors attend a memorial to all those who died in the FAYZ, Sam and Astrid ask Diana to live with them, to which she agrees. No one knows what happens to Dekka.

=== Monster ===
Four years after the collapse of the FAYZ, more "Anomalous Space Objects" (meteors carrying the gaiaphage virus), head towards Earth, mutating anyone with whom it comes into contact. Genius teenager Shade Darby, who was present when the FAYZ fell and witnessed Gaia kill her mother, steals and ingests some ASO rock, along with her new best friend Cruz Rojas, a trans genderfluid person with a difficult home life. Shade becomes capable of morphing into an insectoid creature with super-speed, while Cruz gains the ability to turn invisible or alter their appearance. Callous artist Justin DeVeere is also exposed to ASO rock and morphs into the giant crustacean-like beast "Knightmare", destroying an aeroplane and the Golden Gate Bridge. Elsewhere, schizophrenic teenager Vincent Vu obtains ASO rock contaminated by starfish and densovirus genetic material and becomes capable of growing into a giant monstrous form able to control reanimated human bodies. The various mutants, dubbed "Rockborn", are able to transform back and forth between human and mutant forms, and feel themselves continually observed by enigmatic "Dark Watchers" while morphed.

Homeland Security Taskforce 66 recruits Dekka to voluntarily ingest some alien rock after revealing that Drake has survived the end of the FAYZ, hoping she can combat the various new threats. She becomes able to morph into a feline beast with the ability to project matter-shredding energies, and soon learns that the corrupt HSTF-66 has abducted and experimented upon numerous people to build a mutant army. Dekka escapes along with Aristotle "Armo" Adamo, a youth with oppositional defiant disorder given a polar bear-like morph form. Dekka and Armo briefly seek refuge in Perdido Beach, where they reunite with Diana. Meanwhile, HSTF-66's leader Tom Peaks is fired by the government, prompting him to vengefully ally with Drake and ingest ASO rock, gaining a dragon-like form capable of vomiting napalm. Shade and Cruz become fugitives from HSTF-66, joined by Shade's equally intelligent ex-boyfriend Malik Tenerife, and Shade fights Justin, who is subsequently captured by HSTF-66. Shade, Cruz and Malik then ally with Dekka and Armo to get to another ASO before Peaks and Drake, leading to a vicious fight interrupted by Vincent, who subdues Peaks, and destroys a few buildings in the proses before escaping. Malik is fatally burned in the fight between Vincent and Peaks, but Shade and Cruz give him some ASO rock in the hope of saving him. Sam provides sanctuary to Dekka and Armo. A governmental memo reveals that the mutants now occupy the FBI's Top 10 Most Wanted, joined by an unknown person named Francis Specter.

=== Villain ===
Warning Sam and Astrid (who are now married) that Drake is still at large, Dekka secretly provides Astrid with the rest of Shade's ASO rock so she can become Rockborn in order to fight Drake. The horrifically burned Malik gains the ability to morph into an illusory version of his unharmed body, at the cost of projecting unbearable pain to other people and leaving him constantly feeling the Dark Watchers' attention. Shade, Cruz and Malik invade HSTF-66's "Ranch" facility, destroying much of the building and freeing Justin and the other mutant captives, and Shade livestreams footage to expose the organisation's crimes. Aspiring comedian and FAYZ survivor Dillon Poe buys ASO rock on the black market and gains a reptilian morph with the ability of mind control. His love interest Saffron Silverman inspires him to try to take over the world, and they seize control of thousands of people in Las Vegas, causing mass carnage and the deaths of thousands, including Saffron. Dekka and Armo regroup with Shade, Cruz and Malik, and they engage Dillon and his enthralled forces in a battle, discovering he cannot control other Rockborn while they are morphed. They are joined by Francis Specter, a teenager who has the ability to turn intangible by passing into a fourth-dimensional plane. As Francis does not feel the Dark Watchers observing her, Malik identifies her as an anomalous Rockborn that could pose a threat to the Watchers.

The military invades Vegas to stop Dillon, who sends his slaves in kamikaze attacks against them. On his way to Vegas to join the carnage, Vincent is killed by the army. Dillon takes many people hostage and douses them in gasoline. Intending to regain the government's trust, Peaks travels to Vegas but inadvertently ignites the hostages with his napalm, killing most of them, though Dekka and her allies are able to save a few. Malik uses his pain-projecting powers to torture Dillon and coerces him into committing suicide, freeing everyone under his control. Dekka, Shade, Cruz, Malik, Armo and Francis form a superhero team, the "Rockborn Gang", and Cruz becomes their public spokesperson after they are seen saving a baby from the flames, while Shade and Malik resume their relationship.

=== Hero ===
Various ASOs have landed across Earth, to the point where most countries are becoming overwhelmed by the emergence of destructive Rockborn. Stricken with guilt over his role in Dillon's massacre, Peaks dies of suicide. To prevent a particularly large ASO from obliterating New York, the government fires nuclear missiles at it to break it up, but this still results in many shards hitting New York, killing or infecting much of the city. Many of those infected are abducted and massacred by government forces, but businessman Bob Markovic and his daughter Simone escape using their morphs: Markovic becomes a gestalt swarm of insects capable of inflicting horrific and agonising diseases upon humans while rendering them unable to die, while Simone becomes able to fly in the form of a blue humanoid with many tiny wings. The power-hungry Markovic, now calling himself "Vector", infects New York's government and seizes control of the city, recruiting a small army of Rockborn to assist him, including Justin.

Discovering Astrid has become Rockborn, Sam ingests the rest of Shade's ASO. He becomes able to create domes of various sizes resembling the FAYZ, while she can morph into a Hulk-like form with super strength and invulnerability. Drake ambushes Astrid, but Astrid easily overpowers him with her new abilities and dissolves him in hydrofluoric acid. Forming an uneasy alliance with the US government, the Rockborn Gang, with Dekka as their official leader, travel to New York to stop Markovic, joined by Simone, Sam and Edilio. Francis strands Justin and some of Markovic's other Rockborn in the fourth dimension, which she dubs "Over There". Markovic tries to reach Washington to conquer the government, but he is trapped by Sam's abilities and the Rockborn Gang kill him with nerve gas. However, Shade is almost killed in the battle, while Sam is forced to destroy a train, killing over forty of Markovic's hostages. Cruz and Armo begin a relationship, and Simone becomes romantically interested in Dekka. A military general helps Dekka, Shade, Cruz, Malik, Armo, Francis, Sam, Astrid, Simone and Edilio go into hiding at a secret bunker, and they agree to consider helping deal with other villainous Rockborn.

The conclusion of Hero reveals the truth about the entirety of the universe depicted throughout the nine books. Malik accompanies Francis in a series of excursions to Over There, and he and Shade theorise that their reality is a simulation created by the Dark Watchers. Malik and Francis' final excursion brings them in contact with a future version of Malik, who confirms his younger self's suspicions and notes that Pete was the only other person to discover the nature of their reality. The older Malik explains that the FAYZ universe was created by an MIT team led by him and Shade 26 years in the future using artificial intelligence and based on their own memories. Although the older Malik acknowledges the suffering felt by those in the simulation, he explains that it cannot be altered, but can be switched off, ending their universe. Malik refuses to make the decision without unanimous approval of the Rockborn Gang. The series ends with the Rockborn Gang about to vote, with the ultimate fate of their universe left unknown.

== Characters ==
- Sam Temple - The main protagonist of the series, a caring, determined and reliable young man who's extremely respected in the FAYZ. Sam receives supernatural power in the form of being able to generate light from his hands. This light can either be to illuminate a dark area or as a lethal weapon. Throughout the series, Sam is constantly pushed to his limits physically and mentally. As the series goes on, Sam frequently encounters challenges that he is the only one capable of dealing with, leaving a large sense of pressure on him at all times. Sam is also a frequent adversary of Caine, his twin brother, before the two ally against the Gaiaphage. Sam's nemesis is Drake Merwin, and the two battle many times before the FAYZ falls. Sam is also in an ongoing relationship with Astrid throughout the series. Before the FAYZ Sam was a hero after saving the school bus from crashing when the driver has a heart attack he then becomes one of the most important people in Perdido Beach after the barrier appears. Later in the series he tries to relinquish his political power.
- Caine Soren - Born "David Temple", Caine is the twin brother of Sam Temple and a primary antagonist throughout most of the series. Narcissistic, charismatic, intelligent and ruthless, Caine seeks power over others and attempts to take control of the FAYZ multiple times throughout the series. Caine gains supernatural powers in the form of telekinesis. He is one of the most powerful mutants in the FAYZ. He has a recurring romantic interest in Diana, which results a child, Gaia. Throughout the series, Caine becomes increasingly heroic, ultimately joining Sam in the fight against the Gaiaphage. Caine eventually dies in the final confrontation with the monster and the destruction of the barrier.
- Astrid "the Genius" Ellison - Often referred to as the smartest person in the FAYZ. An honor student and devout Catholic, Astrid gained her nickname "Astrid the Genius" before the barrier manifested. Caring, intelligent, and ambitious, Astrid often is behind much of the policymaking in the FAYZ. Her knowledge of politics and science makes her the foremost authority on a variety of issues, making her an extremely important figure in the community. Astrid is also the older sister of Peter "Little Pete" Ellison; her role as caretaker for him throughout the series takes a constant toll on Astrid. Throughout much of the series, Astrid is in an ongoing relationship with Sam Temple, which continues after the barrier falls.
- Diana Ladris - A skilled manipulator whose power to determine other mutants' power levels make her a valuable asset and political ally. Diana often plays the part of both protagonist and antagonist in the series. Starting as one of Caine's henchmen, she slowly starts to try and distance herself from villainy as the series goes on. She is the mother of Gaia Ladris-Soren, the only baby born in the FAYZ. Diana is in a strained relationship with Caine through most of the series, thus motivating her switch between hero and villain multiple times.
- Lana Arwen Lazar - One of the most important and respected persons in the FAYZ, Lana has the ability to heal any injury. Brooding, sulky, and sometimes hostile, Lana views the role of healer to be a burden. Lana is also one of the few to have a profound connection with the Gaiaphage, making it a constant adversary for her. Throughout the series, Lana is seen mostly as a loner and often goes on missions of her own.
- Albert Hillsborough - A fourteen-year-old African-American student in charge of food, water, and work in Perdido Beach. He is considered by many to be the most responsible person in the FAYZ. Known for his wealth and for controlling the food and water, he also is known for creating markets in the FAYZ. Although he is clever and powerful, Albert is selfish and somewhat of a coward, as evidenced by him running away when the barrier turns dark. Albert is the inventor of the official currency of the FAYZ. At the dawn of the FAYZ, Albert takes control of the local McDonald's and begins to provide the community with food. As the series progresses, Albert becomes a business tycoon, gathering countless children under his employment. As his power and influence grows, Albert becomes less and less agreeable, making him sometimes an antagonist.
- Peter "Little Pete" Ellison - Astrid's severely autistic younger brother. The most important individual person in the FAYZ, with numerous abilities demonstrated throughout the series ranging from telekinesis and teleportation to creating life, he is also the one who created it. He is constantly fighting the Gaiaphage and stopping it from taking over the FAYZ and its inhabitants throughout the series. The FAYZ wall only comes down when Pete chooses to die during the final battle with Gaia. During the series, all the actions he takes are directed only to solve an immediate problem of his, and he does not comprehend any effects his actions may have on people in the future.
- Brianna "The Breeze" Berenson - One of Sam's best friends, Brianna has the power to run at superhuman speeds, boasting that she is capable of outrunning a speeding bullet. Brianna is brave and fearless, often enthusiastically tangling with Caine and Drake, but her bravado ultimately proves to be her downfall when Gaia attacks the people of the FAYZ.
- Computer Jack - The tech master of the FAYZ, whose passion for technology often leads him to make morally dubious decisions before he ultimately allies with Sam. Jack becomes involved in a complicated relationship with Brianna.
- Dekka Talent - An African-American lesbian girl who intimidates most of the kids not only because of her close relationship with Sam, but also for her power to cancel gravity in a small area. Dekka has unrequited love for Brianna, which initially causes awkwardness between the two friends.
- Edilio Escobar - A Honduran illegal immigrant who proves himself to be essential to the running of the FAYZ, despite having no mutant abilities. Determined, sensitive and brave, Edilio is shown as Sam Temple's right-hand man, and later as his equal, showing extreme loyalty and resolve in the most dangerous of situations. Later in the series he is revealed to be gay, entering a relationship with "The Artful" Roger. A recurring joke is Edilio often being mistaken for Mexican, a joke which he occasionally makes himself.
- Quinn Gaither - Sam's best friend before the FAYZ. When the FAYZ occurs, Quinn betrays Sam to Caine but frees him after learning of Caine's intentions. During the food shortage plaguing the FAYZ, Quinn takes the initiative to start fishing, ultimately leading Perdido Beach's fishing crew.
- Drake "Whip Hand" Merwin - A violent, sadistic and misogynistic psychopath who begins the series as Caine's right hand before coming to serve the Gaiaphage, who regenerates his burned arm as a 10-foot-long tentacle which he can use to whip or strangle people. Despite apparently being killed by Caine in Hunger, part of Drake's tentacle bonds to Brittney, a mutant with the power of immortality, allowing the two to share a single body.
- Gaia "The Gaiaphage" Soren-Ladris - The daughter of Diana Ladris and Caine Soren. The only baby born in the FAYZ, Gaia is possessed by the Gaiaphage almost immediately after her birth. Gaia quickly grows into a child and becomes the second-most powerful mutant in the FAYZ, behind Little Pete. Her malice and affinity for carnage make her an immediate threat to the children of the FAYZ. Gaia can use the abilities of any mutant in the FAYZ, though that power disappears when that person dies.
- Charles "Orc" Merriman - Nicknamed so for his gargantuan size and limited intelligence, Orc is the original school bully in Perdido Beach. Closely accompanied by his friend Howard Bassem at all times, Orc begins the series as an antagonist. His lack of fear and empathy cause him to accidentally kill a mutant, Bette, the guilt of which causes him to become an alcoholic before becoming a born-again Christian. After being mauled by coyotes, Orc's skin is replaced by a gravel-like substance that makes him almost immune to pain and incredibly strong.
- Brittney Donegal - A devout Christian seemingly killed in Hunger, who discovers she has the ability of immortality. Initially believing that her ability is a divine gift to kill Caine and Drake, Brittney becomes bonded with Drake and shares her body with him, and is manipulated by the Gaiaphage into accepting it as her god.
- Mary Terrifino - One of the main characters in the first few books, Mary took it upon herself to take care of the children at the daycare in town, her slowly decaying mental state leads her to almost kill most of the children from the daycare in the book 'Lies' in the first book, 'Gone' it is revealed she has anorexia and bulimia.

== Critical reception ==
Reviews have generally been mixed to positive, though many note Gone's success in its intended demographic. Mal Peet, for The Guardian, pointed to the series' "rave reviews, most of them posted on websites by teenagers", though noting that such success stemmed from literary sacrifices that made characters into "crude two-dimensional digitisations".

Amanda Craig, for The Times, noted that Gone was "heavily influenced by TV series such as Lost and Heroes, and described the book as "Clever but a little too predictable." Jayne Howarth, for the Birmingham Post, called Gone "superb" and said she found the book "full of suspense, action and the supernatural. Think of a potent mix of Lord of the Flies, Heroes and Lost and you get an idea of the audience this will appeal to." Describing the pace of the novel as "frantic and frenetic" Howarth summed up: "This is an incredible mystery story, with twists and turns, cameos and protagonists, to keep readers engrossed... Violent in parts, Grant does not hold back at showing the feral nature of humans when faced with a world without order. Unputdownable."

Dinah Hall, reviewing Lies for The Sunday Telegraph, also drew comparison with Lord of the Flies and Lost, and wrote: "While it's never going to make it on to the GCSE syllabus, it definitely has the addictive pull of a cult television series... I would sell my soul for the next installment." Toby Clements, reviewing Hunger for The Daily Telegraph, wrote: "Grant's world is hard-edged but thought-provoking, a Stephen King novel for youngsters in which the children are challenged with reshaping society while fighting off evil. Hunger ought to be required reading for any teenager who thinks adults suck."

Stephen King has also praised the series, writing: "These are exciting, high-tension stories told in a driving, torrential narrative that never lets up. There are monsters, there are kids with mad-crazy super powers, there's the mystery of where all the adults went. Most of all, there are children I can believe in and root for. This is great fiction."
