= The Berzerker (album) =

Studio album by The Berzerker
- Released: April 10, 2000
- Genre: Industrial death metal, grindcore
- Length: 40:55
- Label: Earache

The Berzerker chronology
The Berzerker (2000)	Dissimulate (2002)

Professional ratings
Review scores
Source	Rating
AllMusic	2.5/5 stars
Kerrang!	4/5 stars

The Berzerker was the first album of the band The Berzerker. There is no human drummer on this album, as a drum machine was used.

Videos were made of the first two tracks, but neither of them were ever aired on MTV. "Forever" contains epilepsy-inducing imagery and "Reality" contains extremely grisly images taken from a medical school. The Berzerker frontman Luke says that the video for "Reality" was filmed in four days on a budget of $340.

== Track listing ==
1. "Reality" – 1:18
2. "Forever" – 2:41
3. "Burnt" – 2:53
4. "Pain" – 2:14
5. "Cannibal Rights" – 2:08
6. "Massacre" – 3:26
7. "Chronological Order of Putrefaction" – 2:48
8. "Deform" – 2:44
9. "Slit down" – 1:38
10. "February" – 4:07
11. "Mono Grind" – 1:01
12. "Ignorance" – 2:01
13. "Humanity" – 1:43
14. "95" – 3:52
15. "Ode To Nash" – 5:43

Released also as a limited 2-disc edition. Track listing for disc 2:

1. "Incarnated Solvent Abuse (Live)" – 4:43
2. "Cannibal Rights (Live)" – 2:06
3. "Deform (Live)" – 2:45
4. "Intro Commentary" – 0:57
5. "Isolated vocal tracks from "Massacre"" – 1:16
6. "Forever commentary" – 1:00
7. "Isolated guitar tracks from "Forever"" – 2:42
8. "Cannibal Rights commentary" – 0:31
9. "Isolated drum and sample tracks from "Cannibal Rights"" – 2:12
10. "February commentary" – 0:32
11. "Isolated vocal and keyboard tracks from "February"" – 2:02
12. "Burnt commentary" – 0:51
13. "Isolated bass tracks from "Burnt"" – 3:00
14. "Deform commentary" – 0:42
15. "Deform (Demo)" – 2:45
16. "Untitled (Demo)" – 1:11

== Personnel ==
- Luke Kenny – vocals, samples, drum programming
- Ed Lacey – guitar, bass
- Jay – guitar, bass
- Sam Bean – guitar, bass, vocals
- Toby – additional vocals
