= World of Lies =

Studio album by The Berzerker
- Released: 13 December 2005
- Recorded: Dec 2004–Aug 2005
- Genre: Industrial death metal, grindcore
- Length: 58:00
- Label: Earache
- Producer: Luke Kenny

The Berzerker chronology
Dissimulate (2002)	World of Lies (2005)	Animosity (2007)

World of Lies, released in 2005, is the third album by the band The Berzerker. This release marked a change in the band's sound as the tempo was slower on most tracks.

== Track listing ==
All songs written and arranged by Luke Kenny.

1. "Committed to Nothing" – 2:39
2. "Black Heart" – 2:16
3. "All About You" – 2:41
4. "Burn the Evil" – 2:30
5. "World of Tomorrow" – 2:24
6. "Follow Me" – 2:42
7. "Y" – 2:57
8. "As the World Waits" – 3:16
9. "Afterlife" – 3:20
10. "Never Hated More" – 3:18
11. "Free Yourself" – 3:03
12. "Constant Pain" – 2:25
13. "Farewell" – 20:08

The thirteenth track, "Silence", is not listed on the back cover of the album and is normally referred to as "............". Rather than the usual way of listing untitled tracks (track number, no song name), the track number is eliminated completely.

== Reception ==
Professional ratings
Review scores
Source	Rating
Metal Reviews	90/100
MetalReview.com	9/10
Blabbermouth.net	8/10 stars

== Personnel ==
- Luke Kenny – producer, vocals, drum programming, synth
- Ed Lacey – guitar, bass
- Jason V. – guitar, bass
- Adrian Naudi – guitar, bass
- Sam Bean – guitar, bass
