= Animosity (The Berzerker album) =

Studio album by The Berzerker
- Released: 12 February 2007
- Genres: Industrial death metal, grindcore
- Length: 28:55
- Label: Earache

The Berzerker chronology
World of Lies (2005)	Animosity (2007)	The Reawakening (2008)

Animosity is the fourth album by the band The Berzerker released in 2007. A drum machine was used on the drum parts as with the first and third albums.

== Reception ==
Metal Hammer gave it a rating of

== Track listing ==
1. "Eye for an Eye" – 2:17
2. "Purgatory" – 3:04
3. "False Hope" – 3:29
4. "Evolution" – 2:47
5. "No more Reasons" – 2:45
6. "Retribution" – 2:41
7. "The Cancer" – 3:09
8. "Weapons of War" – 2:31
9. "Heavily Medicated" – 2:26
10. "Lonely World" – 3:47

The song "Heavily Medicated" was featured in Issue 164 of Metal Hammer magazine.

A Limited Edition was also released with a live bonus disc entitled Live in London. It was recorded on the UK tour at London's Dome on 16 December 2006.

=== Bonus disc track listing ===
1. "Intro"
2. "Forever"
3. "Compromise"
4. "The Principles and Practices of Embalming"
5. ""Y""
6. "Never Hated More"
7. "World of Tomorrow"
8. "Disregard"
9. "All About You"
10. "Cannibal Rights"
11. "Heavily Medicated"
12. "Burnt"
13. "Afterlife"
14. "Chapel of Ghouls" (Morbid Angel cover)
15. "Pure Hatred"
16. "Deform"
17. "No One Wins"
18. "Death Reveals"
19. "Reality"
20. "Committed to Nothing"
21. "Corporal Jigsore Quandary" (Carcass cover)

== Personnel ==
- Luke Kenny — vocals, drum programming
- Jason — guitar and bass
