= Berserk (robot) =

Combat robot developed in Belarus

Berserk
мини
Overview
Country of origin	Belarus
Classification	Combat Robot
Year of creation	2018
Crew, operator	1
Specifications
Weight, kg	2200
Length, m	2,5
Height, m	1,43
Width, m	1,4
Speed, km/h	6
Cruising range, km	30
Operating time, hours	24
Specific ground pressure, kg/cm2	0,37
Armament
Country of origin	Soviet Union
Machine gun	GShG-7.62
Number of machine guns	2
Caliber, mm	7,62
Allowance of ammunition, rounds	3000
Rate of fire, rpm	from 400 up to 6000
Firing range, m	1000
Homing system
Sight	Optical-electronic station Chizh
Number of channels	4
Target detection range, km	до 10
Satellite positioning system	GPS/GLONASS

Berserk is an unmanned remotely controlled combat complex that was developed in the Republic of Belarus in 2018. The combat complex is equipped with two four-barrel rapid-firing aircraft machine guns GShG-7.62 and designed for engagement of small-size UAVs and enemy troops. For the first time, Berserk was presented at the parade of troops of the Minsk garrison on July 3, 2019 in honor of Independence Day of the Republic of Belarus.

== Chassis ==
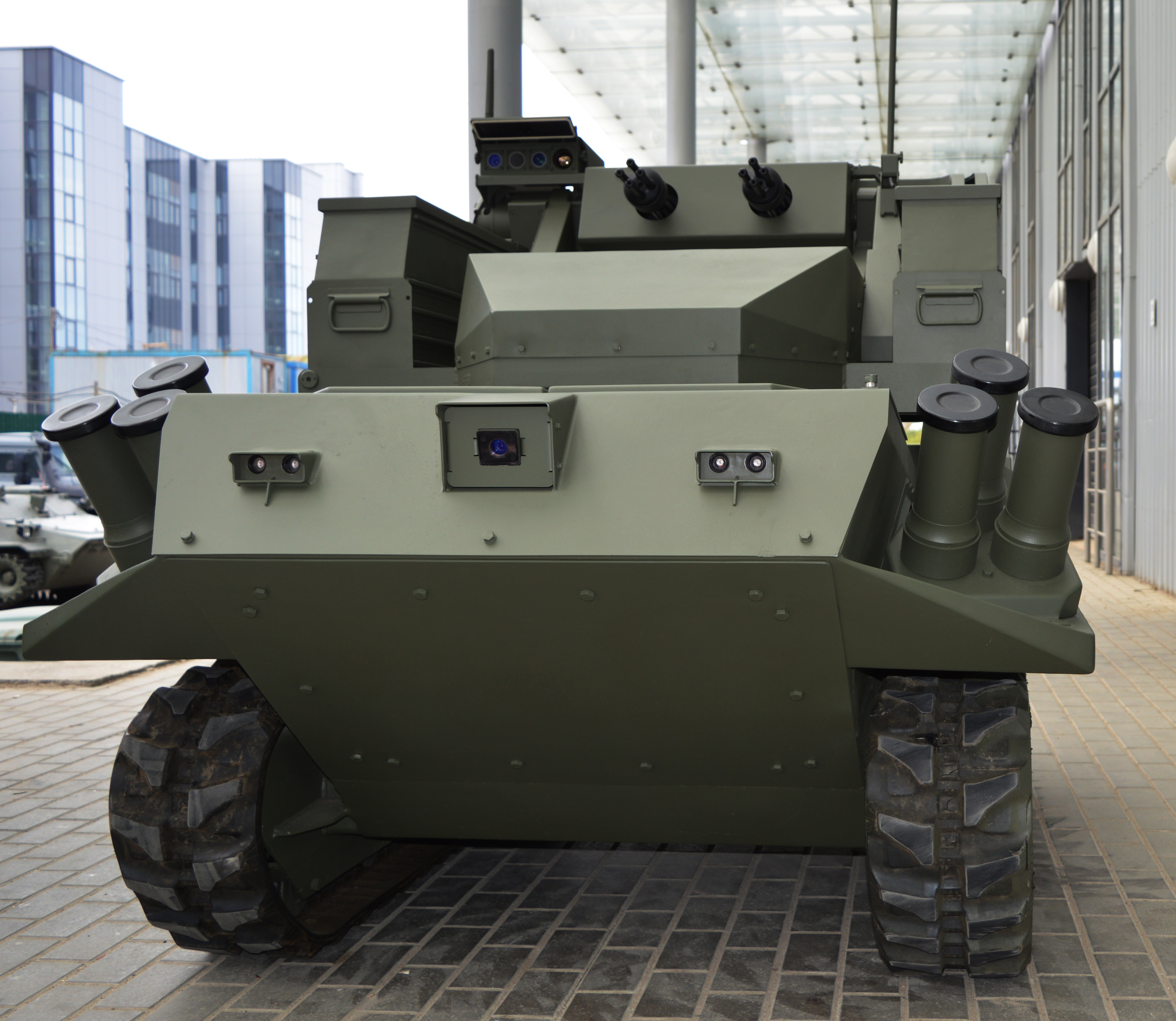

When developing the chassis for Berserk, Belarusian designers decided on the tracked one. The reason is that the complex must be stable while firing, because the GShG-7.62 machine guns have a strong recoil. The chassis design was adopted in a ratio of 1:3 (height to width). This option, together with a low center of gravity, provided maximum stability when firing. In addition, the complex uses two separate drivetrains, each driving one track that allows the Combat robot to turn in place, like the tank T-90. The complex has a low specific ground pressure and therefore has a high level of cross-country ability.

According to its design, the mobile platform consists of a tracked chassis, power supply system, TV viewing module, positioning and control module.

The chassis is equipped with a hybrid engine -electric generators and a conventional gasoline engine, which is mainly used for recharging batteries. This design allows the combat vehicle not only to work silently, but also due to the low heat profile of the batteries makes Berserk almost invisible to thermal imagers. There are 6 blocks (3 on each side) of smoke grenades system 902 "Cloud" mounted on the chassis.

== Armament ==
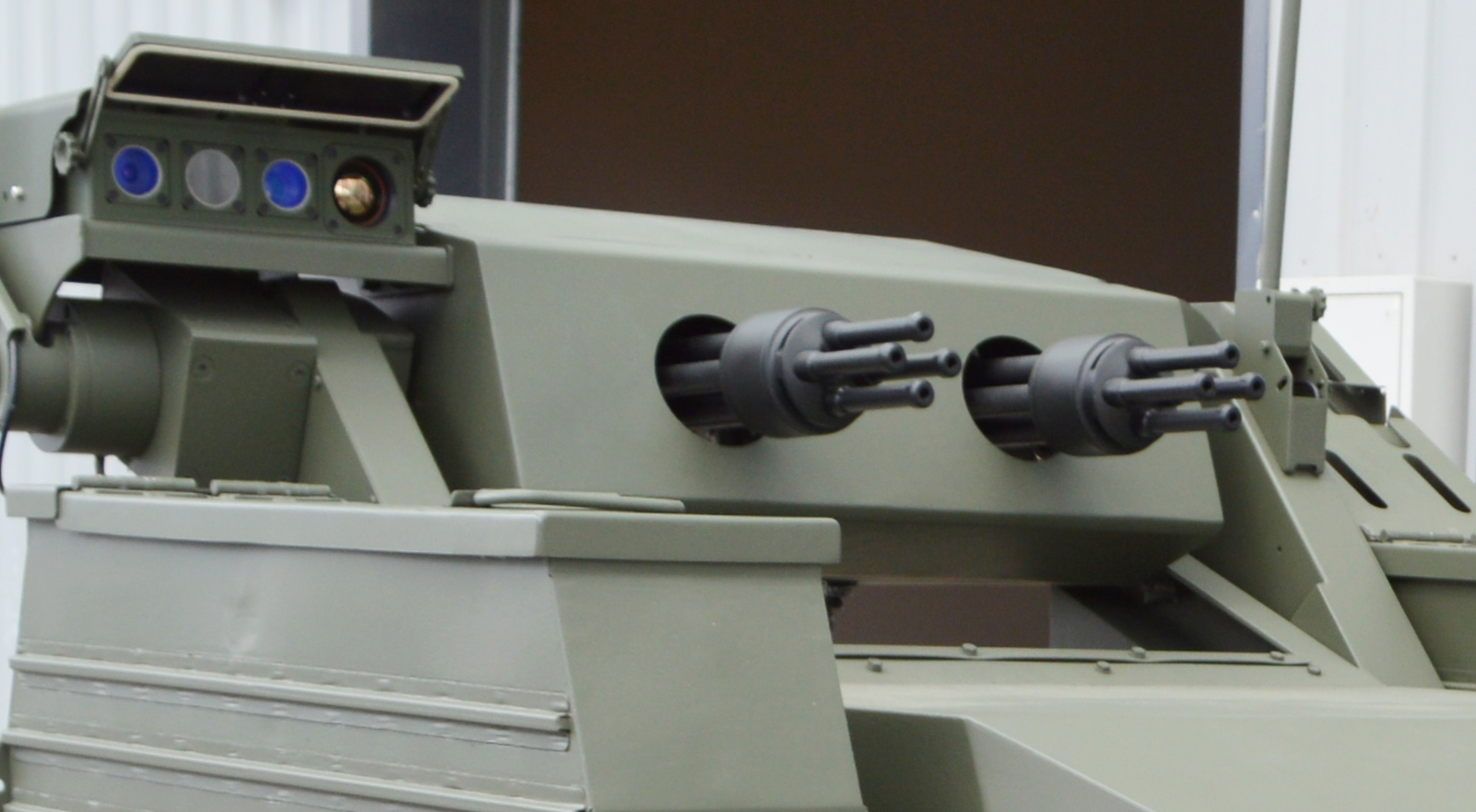
mini

Berserker rotary combat platform is equipped with two Soviet four-barrel aircraft machine guns Glagolev-Shipunov-Gryazev GShG-7.62. The weapon was developed by JSC “KBP named after Academician A.Shipunov” and has a high rate of fire - up to 6000 rounds per minute. The effective range is about 600 meters, and the maximum range is up to 1000 meters.

Berserk’s machine guns are able to provide a rate of fire from 400 to 6000 rounds per minute due to the electric barrels rotation system, which has replaced the gas rotation system. The weapon uses 7.62×54R round.

== Control ==
In order to implement the concept of weapon informatization, where each unit of equipment or fighter is an information node in an automated control system, the combat robot is integrated into automated control system "Alliance".

For example, if you installed an intelligent sight on a weapon or put a cardiometer and vital signs system on a soldier, then you got another source of information. As a result, the commander not only sees the situation on the battlefield in real time, but also knows about the condition of a particular fighter. Berserk is flexibly integrated into already existing environment. All its elements are based on communication, transmission of telemetry and other data.

The combat robot has a jam-proof radio transmitter, both for telemetry signals and for transmitting a high-definition video signal. The radius of stable control of Berserk is about 2 kilometers in the city, and more than 5 kilometers in the open area. If necessary, the combat control radius can be significantly increased by using a retransmitter mounted on multicopter.

== Guidance system ==
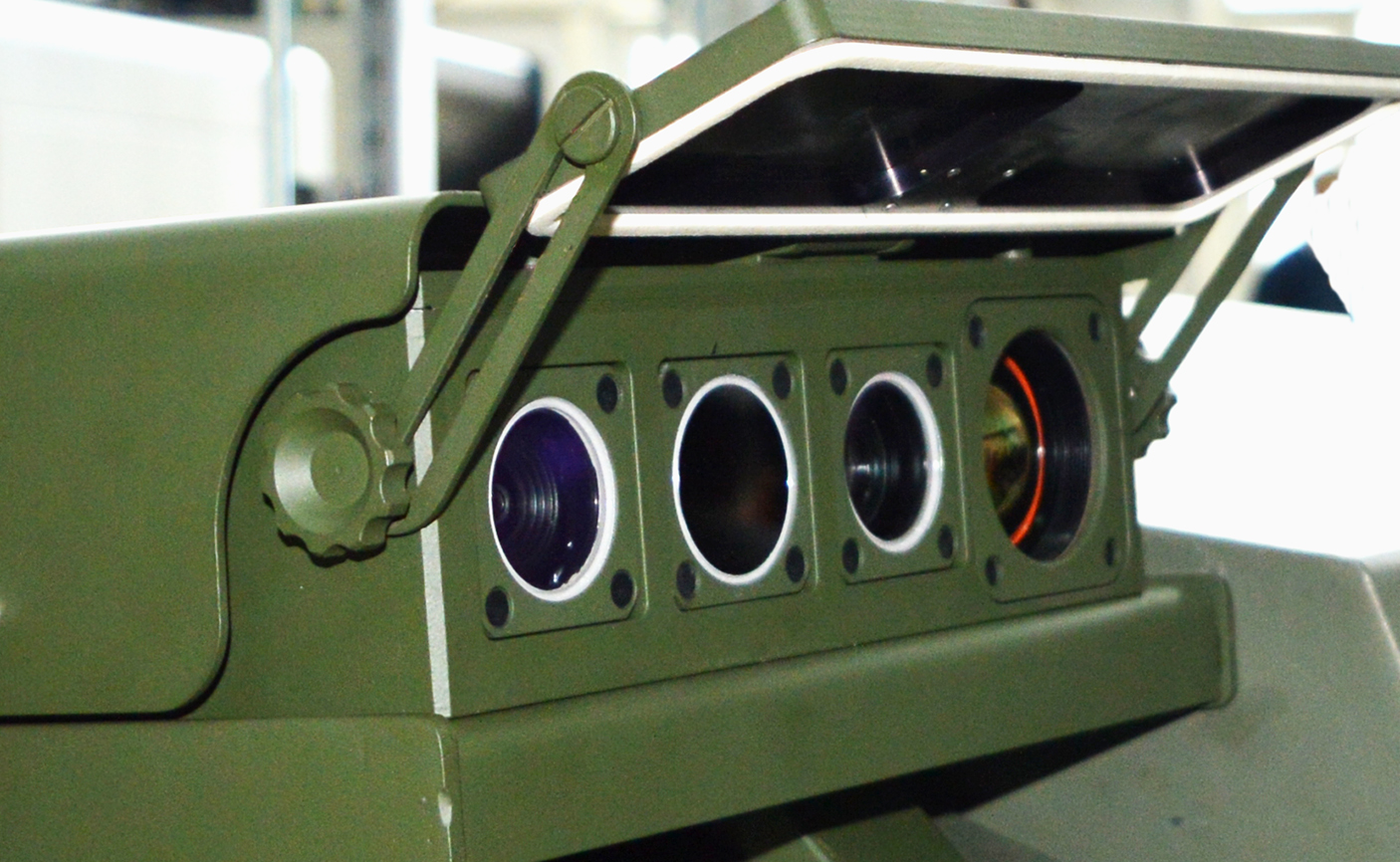
mini

Berserk has a two-channel optical-electronic station with a wide and narrow field of view "Chizh» developed by the Belarusian specialists. The target search is provided by the video and thermal imaging channels with a wide field of view, and the narrow field of view channel provides lock-on and tracking of the detected target. The detection range of a helicopter-type target is about 10 km, and a small-size UAV of rotary- or fixed-wing type is up to 2 km.

== Tests ==
Live firing tests and the robotic complex chassis trials were conducted in October-December 2018 at two Belarusian military training grounds near Borisov and Domanovo. The robotic complex had to detect, identify and destroy a small-size UAV. In addition, Berserk was also tested as a fire-support mean for Special Forces. In 2018, Berserk was demonstrated to the President of the Republic of Belarus Alexander Lukashenko as part of a display of promising samples of equipment and weapons of the Belarusian military-industrial complex. "This is the highest accuracy. This robot is a good technique. We will produce them, improve them and put them into service. And there is already a demand for them abroad," the President stressed.
