= Animosity (film) =

- Directed by: Brendan Steere
- Written by: Brendan Steere
- Produced by: Brandon Taylor; Roy Frumkes
- Starring: Tracy Willet; Marcin Paluch; Thea McCartan; Tom Martin; Alyssa Kempinski; Stephan Goldbach; Michelle Jones
- Cinematography: Jesse Gouldsbury
- Edited by: Steve Burgess
- Music by: Geoff Gersh
- Production company: Laika Come Home
- Release date: May 13, 2013
- Running time: 107 minutes
- Country: United States
- Language: English

Animosity is a 2013 horror thriller film written and directed by Brendan Steere. It had its world premiere on May 13, 2013, and stars Tracy Willet and Marcin Paluch as two newlyweds who discover a sinister presence in the woods.

== Premise ==
Mike (Marcin Paluch) and Carrie (Tracy Willet) Bonner are newly wed and have decided to move into a house set deep into a quiet and secluded forest. Carrie is unnerved by a series of strange encounters with others living in the area, encounters that her husband dismisses as nothing to worry about. She is horrified when she witnesses a violent event and becomes convinced that the area is home to sinister supernatural powers.

== Cast ==
- Marcin Paluch as Mike Bonner
- Tracy Willet as Carrie Bonner
- Thea McCartan as Lauren
- Tom Martin as Carl Hampton
- Stephan Goldbach as Tom
- Alyssa Kempinski as Nicole
- Matt Ziegel as Joe
- Michelle Jones as Erin
- Rob O'Rourke as Boy

== Reception ==
Fangoria gave Animosity three skulls and praised the movie for its use of the film's setting, while the McPherson Sentinel commented that while they did enjoy the movie overall "the first third of the film is very rough". TVQC rated the movie highly and compared it favorably to Blue Ruin and Cold in July. Bloody Disgusting was mixed and gave the movie two skulls, stating that the movie could very well improve with repeated viewings and that they would write a new review if this was the case, but that they left the theater "feeling worn out and unsatisfied."

=== Awards ===
- Dreamer Award for Best Horror Film at the Buffalo Dreams Fantastic Film Festival (2013, won)
- Dreamer Award for Best Actress at the Buffalo Dreams Fantastic Film Festival (2013, won - Tracy Willet)
