= Making Out (book series) =

Young adult series by K.A. Applegate and Michael Grant

- Author: K.A. Applegate, Michael Grant
- Country: United States
- Language: English
- Genre: Young Adult, Romance
- Media type: Print (hardcover and paperback)

Making Out is a series of young adult novels by authors K. A. Applegate and Michael Grant. The series was originally known as "Boyfriends/Girlfriends" and published by HarperPaperbacks. It was repackaged for publication in the UK under the series title "Making Out", to better sales. Avon bought the rights and relaunched the series in August 1998 under the "Making Out" name.. The first eight books were republished in 2015 in four omnibus editions under the collective title The Islanders.

The books focus on the lives of teenagers living on Chatham Island, a fictional island off the coast of Maine. The main characters early in the series are Zoey Passmore and her brother Benjamin, Claire Geiger and her sister Nina, Jake McRoyan, Lucas Cabral, and Aisha Gray.

The books deal with several difficult topics such as the death of a parent, child sexual abuse, divorce, disability, drugs, and alcohol, and follow the effect of these issues on the characters' lives, from their senior year in high school to life in college.

The series was published in German with an additional 29th book. Books from the series have also been translated into Bulgarian, Czech, Dutch, French, Greek, Hungarian, Lithuanian, and Thai.

== List of books ==
There are 28 books in the whole series, but only the first eight books were written by Katherine Applegate. Books #9-28 were ghostwritten.

1. Zoey Fools Around
2. Jake Finds Out
3. Nina Won't Tell
4. Ben's In Love
5. Claire Gets Caught
6. What Zoey Saw
7. Lucas Gets Hurt
8. Aisha Goes Wild
9. Zoey Plays Games
10. Nina Shapes Up
11. Ben Takes a Chance
12. Claire Can't Lose
13. Don't Tell Zoey
14. Aaron Lets Go
15. Who Loves Kate?
16. Lara Gets Even
17. Two-Timing Aisha
18. Zoey Speaks Out
19. Kate Finds Love
20. Never Trust Lara
21. Trouble with Aaron
22. Always Loving Zoey
23. Lara Gets Lucky
24. Now Zoey's Alone
25. Don't Forget Lara
26. Zoey's Broken Heart
27. Falling for Claire
28. Zoey Comes Home
