= Zerker =

Zerker may refer to:

- Thunder Zerker, character in the Japanese video game Mega Man Star Force 2
- Zerkaa (born 1992), English YouTuber also known by his stage name Josh Zerker
- Zerker Road, Kern County, California

== See also ==
- Berserker (disambiguation)
- Zerka (disambiguation)
