= BZRK =

Dystopian book series by Michael Grant

BZRK (novel series)
- First edition of the first book in the series.
- Author: Michael Grant
- Country: United States
- Language: English
- Genre: Horror, science fiction, dystopia
- Publisher: EgmontUSA
- Published: 2012
- Media type: Print (hardback & paperback) and ebook

BZRK is a book series written by Michael Grant. The series consists of four books: BZRK, BZRK II: Reloaded, BZRK III: Apocalypse and BZRK: Origins (the prequel to the series). The series follows the interaction between two warring factions. On one side Charles and Benjamin Armstrong, owners of the Armstrong Fancy Gifts Corporation have a goal to turn the world into their version of utopia. The only people who can stop them are a group of teenagers with the codename BZRK. In 2011, Grant's BZRK had a multimedia online debut with gaming, apps and social media tie-ins beginning six months before the book's publication.

== Books ==
- BZRK New York : Egmont USA, 2012. According to WorldCat, the book is held in 1121 libraries
- BZRK: Reloaded New York, NY : Egmont USA, 2013. According to WorldCat, the book is held in 741 libraries.
- BZRK: Apocalypse London : Electric Monkey, 2014. According to WorldCat, the book is held in 117 libraries
- BZRK: Origins New York : Egmont USA, [2013] According to WorldCat, the book is held in 33 libraries
