= The Berzerker =

Australian metal band

- Origin: Melbourne, Australia
- Genres: Death metal, grindcore, industrial metal, speedcore
- Years active: 1995–2010; 2019–present
- Labels: Berzerker Industries; Earache Records
- Members: Luke Kenny; Matt Wilcock; Sam Bean; Todd Hansen
- Past members: Patrick Beaudoin; Chris Valagao; Matthew Racovalis; Gary Thomas; Fillip Rutherford; Adrian Naudi; Dave Gray; Damien Palmer; Martin Germ Bermheden; Tim Aldridge; Ed Lacey; Jason V.
- Website: www.theberzerker.com

The Berzerker are an Australian/British industrial death metal band from Melbourne formed in 1995. The band's music, influenced by older death metal and grindcore bands such as Carcass, Obituary, and Napalm Death, can be characterised as a fusion of these with speedcore and gabber. The band's founding member, Luke Kenny, described the band's style as industrial death metal.

The Berzerker has produced five full-length albums, The Berzerker (2000), Dissimulate (2002), World of Lies (2005), Animosity (2007) and The Reawakening (2008). These were released through Earache Records, with the exception of the last album, which was self-released through Berserker Industries. During the early part of their career as a live act, band members were identified only as The Vocalist, The Guitarist, The Bassist and The Drummer, distinguishable on stage by the masks they wore. The group abandoned this approach after the masks became unhygienic with age, and to avoid comparisons with Slipknot.

A DVD documentary, The Principles and Practices of The Berzerker (2004), includes several hours of live concert footage, as well as the first public images of the unmasked band members.

Most of the band's music videos have been banned from broadcast for reasons such as the possible epileptic seizure-inducing imagery contained in the video "Forever", and the imagery of "Reality", which features graphic images of cadavers and body parts.

== Biography ==
=== Beginnings and the first album (1995–2000) ===
The Berzerker gained the attention of metal audiences through remixes of songs by death metal bands Deicide and Morbid Angel. They remixed the song with the screams of mentally ill patients with their friends Stalaggh. Earache signed the act, then consisting of Luke Kenny as a one-man DJ/programmer. Kenny had been a drummer in various Melbourne bands, including an early death metal group called Mystic Insight, but after suffering injuries in a motor vehicle accident that involved twenty 18-wheeler trucks, he gave up playing. Earache Records' website suggests that the album was supposed to be recorded at Devin Townsend's Vancouver studio with contributions from David Vincent (Morbid Angel), Kevin Sharp (Brutal Truth, Damaged), Dan Lilker (Brutal Truth, Nuclear Assault), and Jed Simon (Strapping Young Lad, Zimmers Hole) until they were all injured in a mysterious event. After disagreements and financial issues, Kenny returned to Australia and worked with Sam Bean, who recorded guitar parts as well as backing vocals. Also enlisted was a different Sam contributing backing vocals, dubbed "Toby" due to Bean's seniority. Guitarists Jason and Ed Lacey from local metal band The Wolves were recruited, and after a lengthy recording session, the band's first album, The Berzerker, was released. The album received praise in underground metal magazines, and the band was compared to Napalm Death and Strapping Young Lad. The band's masks and live performances earned them more publicity. Videos for the songs "Reality" and "Forever" were released, but were rarely aired on MTV and other mainstream outlets. MTV refused after they received threats for "heads to roll."

=== New members, the second album and touring (2001–2003) ===
The Berzerker had their first full U.S. tour after performing fewer than half a dozen shows, touring with other underground bands Dying Fetus, Gorguts and Skinless. Although the shows were well received, the band did not function through the rigors of touring as a unit and at the end of the tour the session musicians, drawn from Melbourne band Alarum, departed. For some months it seemed doubtful that The Berzerker would last for long. There had been constant setbacks at every stage and any momentum gained was now lost with the departure of the live act. However, the arrival of two replacement members injected new life into the band – drummer Gary Thomas from Perth band Plague and guitarist Matt Wilcock from Melbourne death metal band Abramelin, currently in Akercocke.

With the arrival of these new members The Berzerker set about recording their follow up album Dissimulate. The song 'No-one Wins' was also released as a video. It was claimed that Thomas' drumming on this song was considered for submission to the Guinness Book of Records as fastest drumming performance and while the band has since dismissed this as a fan-fuelled rumour, it was included in official press releases at the time. Around this time the band's dragon logo was redone by designer Ivan Kenny-Sumiga. The band celebrated by playing live shows which resulted in onstage violence in Melbourne for months before heading off for a world tour lasting from 2002 to 2003.

After covering Australia, The Berzerker toured the US with Immolation, Vader and Origin, then travelled to the UK for a headlining tour with Labrat, Insision and Red Harvest. This culminated in an infamous Earache Christmas Party appearance, where the band terrorised both record label and the audience. This exceptionally violent and drunken performance was captured on the DVD Principles and Practices of The Berzerker. The band continued on to the US after a brief Christmas break to do another full US tour with Nile, Napalm Death, Strapping Young Lad and Dark Tranquillity. Disaster struck in New York however when Thomas had an altercation with a bouncer that resulted in a broken foot and cracked vertebrae. The band could not pull out of the tour as there was still a week left, and each show had to be played to allow them to afford to make plane flights to the next tour because members of the band were poor. To solve the problem, Kenny took on playing the drums as well as vocals. Nile drummer Tony Laureano played the Carcass cover "Corporal Jigsore Quandary" each night. The footage of this would later be added to the DVD "The Berzerker".

At the end of that tour, the band spent ten days in Florida before their headline tour of the UK and Europe began. With no drummer, auditions were organised and the band selected a local drummer to take on tour. The new drummer was required to learn the full headlining tour set in six days. The Berzerker hit the UK for its next round of headlining shows featuring snuff footage, locals being abducted, and audiences getting punched in the face, then headed out to Europe for their first-ever appearance there. Finally after five months of touring the band headed home.

=== First DVD, unmasked for the first time (2004) ===
Luke Kenny decided to focus the downtime into compiling all the footage he had recorded of the band, producing a DVD titled The Principles and Practices of The Berzerker. This DVD ended up being over four hours long, consisting of one professionally shot show, another concert-worth of assorted bootleg footage, backstage recordings, band rehearsals, and touring. Also included was documentary-style footage of the recording of both albums (including many unflattering incidents), full interviews with band members, the making of the masks and artwork, and contributions from fans, including one who had tattooed the dragon logo onto her back. The DVD was recommended by Kerrang! for aspiring metal bands.

The DVD brought with it a change in The Berzerker – for the first time, the band members' faces were unmasked. Following this, a decision was made to lose the masks altogether.

=== World of Lies (2005–2006) ===
With Thomas healing in Perth and Wilcock moving to the UK to join Akercocke, The Berzerker decided to record the third album World of Lies over Christmas 2004 with the original line-up from the debut album. It was recorded spontaneously over a week, with no prior planning in direct opposition to how they had created albums in the past. In other changes, all guitar tracks were recorded directly into a laptop via an analogue-to-digital converter without a guitar amp and no live drumming featured on the album. Subsequent live performances featured Dave Gray of Akercocke taking over drumming duties. The album was well received by many critics and one said that "it is a masterpiece of work, that was created in only a matter of minutes".

=== Animosity (2007–2008) ===
A year after the release of World of Lies, The Berzerker released their fourth studio album Animosity on 12 February 2007. This recording saw the band return to their older style of music with a drum machine included for the drum parts as well as a faster tempo in most of the tracks compared to the previous album. A special edition version of this album was also available which included a bonus live CD by the band recorded at London Dome on 16 December 2006 featuring the then new track "Heavily Medicated", a selection of tracks from their previous albums, as well as several covers of songs by Morbid Angel and Carcass.

=== The Reawakening (2008–2009) ===
Animosity was the last record the band were contracted with Earache Records. For the next album The Reawakening the band released it through their own label 'Berzerker Industries'. The album was only available through their official online store. Following the release they toured extensively in several parts of the world sharing the stage with other acts including Satyricon, Napalm Death, Suicide Silence, and Zonaria.

=== Hiatus and break-up (2009–2010) ===
2009 would be the last known year where the band were actively touring the world and playing shows. After October 2009 the band ceased updates. No new tours or future plans were announced. The band appeared to be on hiatus for just over a year, and in late 2010 it seemed the band had indeed split up following several status updates on their Myspace profile referring to 'It's Finally Over' and 'Last Berzerker show in Melbourne'. Furthermore, Kenny has stated that he had lost interest in carrying on with the band and has since moved on to a photography job for Evokke magazine. Since the break-up, former bassist, Sam Bean has released an album with his new band, The Senseless. He also stated in an interview that The Berzerker were on "indefinite hiatus", adding that this "is the best way to describe it."

=== Reformation (2019–present) ===
According to the official Facebook page of the band, The Berzerker said a new album would be released in 2020, but as of September 2021, no album has been released. However a cover of All the Things She Said by pop/rock duo t.A.T.u. was released in 2020 via the band's MySpace with a music video. It was deleted from MySpace due to the service's decline, but the music video is still on YouTube. The Berzerker have since posted an update in December 2023 regarding the future of the band and possible new studio album on their official Facebook page, stating that because of personal issues the album has been postponed indefinitely.

On August 14, 2024, Luke Kenny posted on the band's Facebook that he's working on a music video for the song "The Deception" from the album The Reawakening. The footage was shot in 2009, but it seemed lost until Luke accidentally found it on his old disc drive. On April 7, 2025, a music video was premiered on the band's YouTube channel.

On December 25, 2025, the band released a new song called "Shut The F*ck Up" accompanied by a music video, which contains a footage of the band's first ever show in 2000.

On May 25, 2026, the band on their Facebook announced their first show in 17 years at Necrosonic Festival which will take place on August 22, 2026. Three days later, the band revealed line-up, which consists Luke Kenny, Sam Bean, Matt Wilcock and Todd Hansen.

== Lineup ==
=== Current members ===
- Luke Kenny – vocals, programming (1995–2010, 2019–present), drums (2003, touring)
- Sam Bean – bass, guitar, vocals (1999–2007, 2019–present)
- Matt Wilcock – guitar (2002–2007, 2019–present)
- Todd Hansen – drums (2007-2010, 2026–present)

=== Past members ===
- Chris Valagao – vocals (1998–1999)
- Patrick Beaudoin – guitars (1998–1999)
- Jason Lacey (II) – guitar (1999–2007, 2019–2022)
- Edward Lacey – guitar (1999–2010, 2019–2022)
- Adrian Naudi – guitars (2005)
- Martin Bermheden – guitars (2008–2010)
- Tim Aldridge – guitars (2008–2010)
- Damien Palmer – bass (2007–2010)
- Matthew Racovalis – drums (2000–2001)
- Gary Thomas – drums (2002–2003)
- Fillip Rutherford – drums (2003)
- David Gray – drums (2006–2007)

== Discography ==
=== Albums ===
- The Berzerker (2000)
- Dissimulate (2002)
- World of Lies (2005)
- Animosity (2007)
- The Reawakening (2008)

=== Live albums ===
- The Berzerker – Live in London (2010)

=== EPs ===
- Archie Campbell (Website EP – 4 mp3 tracks) (1995)
- No? (EP) (1996)
- Full of Hate (EP) (1996)
- Inextricable Zenith (EP) (1998)
- Broken (EP) (2000)
- Animosity EP (2006)
- The Reawakening EP (2008)

=== Demos ===
- Demos 1998 (2000)

=== Appearances on compilation albums ===
- This Is Terror 11 – Mixed by the Sickest Squad & Frazzbass ("Her Fear Was a Lie" exclusive song for T.I.T. Records) (2008)

=== DVDs ===
- The Principles and Practices of the Berzerker (DVD) (2004)
