= List of Magic: The Gathering artists =

This is a list of artists who have contributed art to the game of Magic: The Gathering. While 25 artists contributed art to the original Alpha Magic set, 418 different artists illustrated Magic cards through Shards of Alara. Ron Spencer, Mark Tedin, and Pete Venters were the final original artists from Alpha to be active (each had their most recent new piece in Magic 2011). Spencer is also among the eleven artists that have contributed more than 200 pieces for Magic, notable others being Greg Staples, Pete Venters, and Kev Walker. As of 2020, Walker is the most-featured artist, with 436 cards featuring his art as of the Double Masters set.

The list refers to the earliest printing of a given piece of art.

Split cards with both sides by the same artist count as two separate pieces.

Name	#	First		Last		Website	Notes
Name	#	Year	Set	Year	Set	Website	Notes
Aaron Boyd	5	2000	Prophecy	2001	7th Edition		
Aaron Miller	78	2013	Theros	2020	Core Set 2021		
Adam Paquette	121	2012	Avacyn Restored	2020	Core Set 2021		
Adam Rex	126	1996	Mirage	2008	Shadowmoor		
Adi Granov	5	2009	Zendikar	2010	Rise of the Eldrazi		
Adrian Majkrzak	5	2017	Amonkhet	2017	Ixalan		
Adrian Smith	26	1996	Mirage	2011	New Phyrexia		
Ai Desheng	6	1999	Portal Three Kingdoms			n/a	
Al Davidson	2	1996	Mirage			n/a	
Alan Pollack	131	1997	Tempest	2015	Commander 2015		
Alan Rabinowitz	44	1995	Homelands	2004	Unhinged		
Alayna Danner	29	2017	Hour of Devastation	2020	Core Set 2021		
Alejandro Mirabal	7	2015	Fate Reforged	2016	Shadows over Innistrad		
Aleksi Briclot	82	2004	Champions of Kamigawa	2019	War of the Spark		
Alex Brock	3	2019	Throne of Eldraine				
Alex Horley-Orlandelli	105	2001	Apocalypse	2014	Commander 2014		
Alex Konstad	35	2017	Hour of Devastation	2019	Throne of Eldraine		
Alexander Forssberg	9	2018	Commander 2018	2020	Core Set 2021		
Alisa Lee	1	2015	Commander 2015				
Allen Williams	29	1997	Tempest	2019	Throne of Eldraine		
Allison Carl	1	2017	Commander 2017				
Alton Lawson	1	2000	Invasion				
Amy Weber	62	1993	Alpha	1997	Fifth Edition		
Anastasia Ovchinnikova	39	2014	Khans of Tarkir	2019	Throne of Eldraine		
Andi Rusu	14	1993	Alpha	1996	Alliances	n/a	
Andrea Radeck	11	2017	Unstable	2020	Unsanctioned		
Andreas Rocha	11	2013	Commander 2013	2016	Shadows over Innistrad		
Andrew Goldhawk	26	1998	Urza's Saga	2003	Eight Edition		
Andrew Murray	1	2008	Shards of Alara				
Andrew Robinson	55	1996	Mirage	2010	Rise of the Eldrazi		
Andrey Kuzinskiy	5	2020	Lair of Behemoths	2020	Core Set 2021		
Anna Podedworna	6	2019	Core Set 2020	2019	Commander 2019		
Anna Steinbauer	18	2015	Magic Origins	2017	Ixalan		
Anson Maddocks	112	1993	Alpha	2006	Time Spiral	https://ansonmaddocks.com/	
Anthony Francisco	35	2008	Shards of Alara	2012	Avacyn Restored		
Anthony Jones	4	2011	Innistrad	2011	Graveborn		
Anthony Palumbo	82	2010	Magic 2011	2019	Core Set 2020		
Anthony S. Waters	114	1994	Legends	2009	Alara Reborn		until Alliances credited as Anthony Waters
Antonio José Manzanedo	22	2019	Core Set 2020	2020	Core Set 2021		
April Lee	3	1997	Tempest				
Ariel Olivetti	1	2009	Conflux				
Arnie Swekel	86	1999	Mercadian Masques	2006	Time Spiral	n/a	
Ash Wood	3	2008	Shards of Alara	2009	Core Set 2010		
Austin Hsu	33	2009	Magic 2010	2012	Dark Ascension		
Babyson Chen & Uzhen Lin	2	2018	Jiang Yanggu & Mu Yanling				
Bartłomiej Gaweł	2	2020	Ikoria Commander	2020	Core Set 2021		
Bastien L. Deharme	55	2015	Magic Origins	2020	Core Set 2021		
Bayard Wu	18	2018	Rivals of Ixalan	2020	Theros: Beyond Death		
BD	1	2012	Return to Ravnica				
Ben Maier	18	2015	Battle for Zendikar	2019	Throne of Eldraine		
Ben Thompson	70	1999	Mercadian Masques	2007	Lorwyn		
Ben Wootten	18	2017	Mind vs. Might	2019	Ravnica Allegiance		
Berry	7	1998	Urza's Saga	2003	Eighth Edition		
Bill Sienkiewicz	2	1996	Alliances				
Billy Christian	56	2020	Theros: Beyond Death	2024	Duskmourn: House of Horror		
Blackie del Rio	2	1997	Visions	1997	5th Edition	n/a	
Bob Eggleton	18	1996	Mirage	1998	Urza's Saga		
Bob Petillo	11	2001	Seventh Edition	2005	Ninth Edition		
Brad Rigney	23	2011	New Phyrexia	2015	Battle for Zendikar		
Bradley Williams	40	1999	Urza's Legacy	2004	Unhinged		in Portal Second Age credited as Brad Williams
Bram Sels	34	2017	Hour of Devastation	2020	Ikoria: Lair of Behemoths		
Brandon Dorman	6	2007	Lorwyn	2008	Morningtide		
Brandon Kitkouski	35	2005	Ravnica	2009	Alara Reborn		
Brian Despain	26	1998	Urza's Saga	2009	Magic 2010		
Brian Durfee	3	1997	Portal	2000	Starter 2000	n/a	
Brian Horton	4	1997	Visions	1997	Weatherlight		
Brian Snøddy	125	1993	Alpha	2008	Morningtide		
Brian Valeza	5	2020	Theros: Beyond Death	2020	Commander 2020		
Brom	42	1997	Weatherlight	2005	Ninth Edition		
Bryan Sola	6	2020	Ikoria: Lair of Behemoths	2020	Core Set 2021	https://bryansola.com/	
Bryan Talbot	8	1997	Visions	1997	Weatherlight		
Brynn Metheney	4	2013	Commander 2013	2017	Unstable		
Bryon Wackwitz	21	1994	Legends	1996	Alliances	https://bryonwart.com/	
Bud Cook	12	2007	Future Sight	2016	Shadows over Innistrad		
Cai Tingting	2	1999	Portal Three Kingdoms			n/a	
Caio Monteiro	19	2019	Core Set 2020	2020	Zendikar Rising		
Campbell White	18	2020	Commander 2020	2020	Zendikar Rising		
Cara Mitten	2	2005	Betrayers of Kamigawa				
Carl Critchlow	218	1998	Urza's Saga	2022	Commander Legends: Battle for Baldur's Gate		
Carl Frank	15	1997	Tempest	2015	Commander 2015		
Carol Heyer	4	1996	Alliances				
Catherine Buck	1	1995	Ice Age			n/a	
Cecil Fernando	4	1997	Visions	1997	Weatherlight	n/a	
Charles Gillespie	19	1996	Mirage	1997	Tempest		
Chase Stone	64	2012	Magic 2012	2017	Ixalan		
Chen Weidong	4	1999	Portal Three Kingdoms			n/a	
Chengo McFlingers	1	2005	Ravnica			n/a	
Chippy	115	1996	Mirage	2013	Gatecrash	n/a	
Chris Appelhans	2	2004	Champions of Kamigawa	2005	Betrayers of Kamigawa		
Chris Dien	2	2005	Ravnica				
Chris Rahn	161	2008	From the Vault: Dragons	2018	Core Set 2019		
Chris Rallis	58	2015	Fate Reforged	2018	Signature Spellbook: Jace		
Christine Choi	42	2012	Return to Ravnica	2017	Amonkhet		
Christopher Burdett	11	2013	Theros	2017	Amonkhet		
Christopher Moeller	255	1998	Urza's Saga	2016	Kaladesh		
Christopher Rush	123	1993	Alpha	2006	Time Spiral		Deceased
Chuck Lukacs	20	2007	Lorwyn	2013	Magic 2014		
Ciruelo Cabral	26	1998	Exodus	2002	Torment		
Cliff Childs	54	2011	Innistrad	2017	Amonkhet		
Cliff Nielsen	10	1996	Mirage	1997	Weatherlight	n/a	
Clint Cearley	80	2011	Commander	2017	Amonkhet		
Clint Langley	8	1997	5th Edition	2006	Time Spiral		
Clyde Caldwell	6	1999	Mercadian Masques	2002	Torment		
Cole Eastburn	6	2008	Eventide	2008	Shards of Alara		
Colin MacNeil	13	1997	Portal	1998	Stronghold		
Corey D. Macourek	4	2002	Onslaught	2004	Unhinged		
Cornelius Brudi	9	1993	Alpha	1995	Ice Age	n/a	
Craig Hooper	1	1997	Visions			n/a	
Craig J. Spearing	34	2014	Magic 2015	2016	Kaladesh		
Craig Mullins	5	2006	Time Spiral				
Cris Dornaus	1	1998	Portal Second Age			n/a	
Cynthia Sheppard	50	2011	Innistrad	2016	Eldritch Moon		
Cyril van der Haegen	39	2004	Fifth Dawn	2014	Khans of Tarkir		
D. Alexander Gregory	88	1996	Mirage	2012	Magic 2013		
D. J. Cleland-Hura	10	2000	Invasion	2001	7th Edition		
Daarken	199	2007	Future Sight	2018	Core Set 2019		
Dameon Willich	26	1993	Alpha	1995	Ice Age	n/a	
Dan Dos Santos	18	2006	Coldsnap	2009	Alara Reborn		
Dan Frazier	153	1993	Alpha	2006	Time Spiral		
Dan Scott	275	2004	Champions of Kamigawa	2022	Double Masters 2022		
Dan Seagrave	2	2008	Eventide	2008	Shards of Alara		
Dana Knutson	23	1999	Mercadian Masques	2006	Dissension		
Daniel Gelon	62	1993	Alpha	2006	Time Spiral	n/a	
Daniel Ljunggren	103	2010	Worldwake	2016	Kaladesh		
Daniel R. Horne	1	1999	Mercadian Masques				
Darbury Stenderu	1	1997	Weatherlight				
Darek Zabrocki	15	2016	Oath of the Gatewatch	2017	Amonkhet		
Daren Bader	168	1997	Tempest	2010	Worldwake		
Darrell Riche	93	2000	Nemesis	2009	Magic 2010		
Dave Allsop	55	2004	Champions of Kamigawa	2011	New Phyrexia		
Dave DeVries	3	2007	Planar Chaos	2008	Shadowmoor		
Dave Dorman	99	1999	Mercadian Masques	2008	Shadowmoor		
Dave Kendall	126	2006	Coldsnap	2016	Eldritch Moon		
Dave Seeley	1	1997	Visions				
David A. Cherry	26	1995	Homelands	1998	Unglued		
David Day	7	2000	Invasion	2007	Duel Decks: Elves vs. Goblins	n/a	
David Gaillet	39	2014	Khans of Tarkir	2017	Amonkhet		
David Ho	2	1996	Mirage	1998	Portal: Second Age		
David Horne	4	1998	Portal Second Age				
David Hudnut	2	2007	Future Sight				
David Martin	82	1999	Mercadian Masques	2008	Eventide		
David Monette	2	1999	Mercadian Masques				
David O'Connor	11	1996	Mirage	1997	5th Edition	n/a	
David Palumbo	79	2008	Shards of Alara	2016	Kaladesh		
David Rapoza	37	2010	Scars of Mirrodin	2013	Dragon's Maze		
David Seguin	2	2015	Fate Reforged (Ugin's Fate)	2016	Shadows over Innistrad		
Dennis Detwiller	12	1994	The Dark	1995	Homelands		
Dermot Power	22	1996	Mirage	1998	Urza's Saga		
Deruchenko Alexander	23	2015	Magic Origins	2017	Amonkhet		
Diana Vick	2	1996	Alliances			n/a	
Ding Songjian	3	1999	Portal Three Kingdoms			n/a	
Dom!	4	1996	Mirage				
Dominick Domingo	10	2007	Lorwyn	2009	Alara Reborn		
Don Hazeltine	35	1999	Urza's Legacy	2007	Planar Chaos		
Donato Giancola	107	1996	Mirage	2011	Magic 2012		
Doug Chaffee	48	1997	Tempest	2006	Time Spiral		
Douglas Shuler	122	1993	Alpha	2005	Ninth Edition		Often as "Douglas Schuler" on early cards.
Drew Tucker	55	1993	Alpha	2008	Eventide		
Dylan Martens	2	1997	Weatherlight			n/a	
E. M. Gist	10	2006	Coldsnap	2009	Magic 2010		
Edward P. Beard Jr.	124	1994	Legends	2005	Ravnica		
Efflam Mercier	4	2016	Kaladesh	2016	Aether Revolt		
Efrem Palacios	12	2010	Scars of Mirrodin	2015	Dragons of Tarkir		
Eric David Anderson	3	1997	Tempest				
Eric Fortune	16	2007	Future Sight	2009	Magic 2010		
Eric Peterson	73	1997	Visions	2003	Mirrodin		
Eric Polak	3	2005	Saviors of Kamigawa			n/a	
Eric Velhagen	7	2012	Return to Ravnica	2015	Magic Origins		
Erica Yang	40	2010	Rise of the Eldrazi	2015	Khans of Tarkir - Ugin's Fate		
Esad Ribic	1	2007	Future Sight			n/a	
Evan Shipard	8	2014	Journey into Nyx	2016	Conspiracy: Take the Crown		
Eytan Zana	28	2011	Innistrad	2016	Kaladesh		
Fang Yue	3	1999	Portal Three Kingdoms			n/a	
Fay Jones	1	1993	Alpha			n/a	
Filip Burburan	25	2014	Magic 2015	2017	Amonkhet		
Florian de Gesincourt	17	2014	Conspiracy	2017	Amonkhet		
Francis Tsai	5	2004	Fifth Dawn	2008	Shards of Alara		
Frank Kelly Freas	2	1999	Mercadian Masques				
Franz Vohwinkel	107	1997	Weatherlight	2016	Shadows over Innistrad		
Fred Fields	14	1999	Mercadian Masques	2009	Zendikar		
Fred Harper	2	2008	Eventide				
Fred Rahmqvist	1	2002	Judgment			n/a	
Gabor Szikszai	115	2005	Ravnica	2010	Magic 2011		Often with Zoltan Boros
Gao Jianzhang	4	1999	Portal Three Kingdoms			n/a	
Gao Yan	10	1999	Portal Three Kingdoms	2000	Nemesis	n/a	
Garry Leach	21	1996	Mirage	1997	Tempest	n/a	credited as Gary Leach
Gary Ruddell	36	1999	Mercadian Masques	2002	Judgment	n/a	
Geofrey Darrow	10	1996	Mirage	1997	Visions	n/a	
George Pratt	14	1997	Visions	1999	Mercadian Masques		
Brom	42	1997	Weatherlight	2003	Mirrodin		
Gerry Grace	19	1996	Mirage	1999	6th Edition		
Glen Angus	75	1999	Mercadian Masques	2007	Future Sight		Deceased
Glenn Fabry	8	2005	Ravnica	2006	Guildpact		
Goran Josic	10	2011	Zendikar	2015	Magic Origins		
Greg Bobrowski	8	2022	Unfinity	2022	Unfinity		
Greg Hildebrandt	168	1999	Urza's Destiny	2009	Alara Reborn		Often worked with twin brother Tim. Deceased
Greg Opalinski	22	2015	Battle for Zendikar	2017	Amonkhet		
Greg Simanson	25	1996	Alliances	1998	Urza's Saga		
Greg Spalenka	5	1997	Visions				
Greg Staples	272	1998	Urza's Saga	2016	Eldritch Moon		
Grzegorz Rutkowski	34	2017	Amonkhet	2018	Core Set 2019		
Hannibal King	27	1996	Mirage	2000	Invasion	n/a	
Harold McNeill	27	1994	Legends	1997	Tempest		
He Jiancheng	4	1999	Portal Three Kingdoms			n/a	
Erica Gassalasca-Jape	2	2003	Scourge				see H. Hudson
Heather Hudson	186	1994	Legends	2008	Eventide		
Henry G. Higgenbotham	4	1998	Urza's Saga				
Henry van der Linde	7	1998	Portal: Second Age	1999	Urza's Legacy		
Hideaki Takamura	22	2004	Champions of Kamigawa	2008	Shards of Alara		
Hiro Izawa	2	2004	Champions of Kamigawa				
Hong Yan	3	1999	Portal Three Kingdoms			n/a	
Howard Lyon	92	2007	Lorwyn	2016	Kaladesh		
Huang Qishi	2	1999	Portal Three Kingdoms			n/a	
Hugh Jamieson	10	2003	Mirrodin	2005	9th Edition		
I. Rabarot	6	1997	Visions				
Iain McCaig	9	2002	Onslaught	2016	Conspiracy: Take the Crown		
Ian Miller	24	1996	Mirage	1997	Weatherlight		
Igor Kieryluk	131	2009	Zendikar	2017	Amonkhet		
Ilse Gort	18	2020	Magic 2021	2021	Kaldheim		
Isis Sangaré	2	2021	Innistrad: Midnight Hunt	2021	"Secret Lair" edition on Stranger Things	Artstation	
Ittoku	24	2004	Darksteel	2007	Future Sight		
Izzy "Izzy" Medrano	152	2008	Shadowmoor	2018	Core Set 2019		
Jack Wang	44	2012	Magic 2013	2016	Shadows over Innistrad		
Jack Wei	3	1999	Portal Three Kingdoms				
Jacques Bredy	1	2000	Invasion			n/a	
Jaime Jones	102	2008	Eventide	2017	Aether Revolt		
Jakub Kasper	24	2015	Fate Reforged	2017	Amonkhet		
Jama Jurabaev	12	2015	Battle for Zendikar	2016	Conspiracy: Take the Crown		
James Ernest	1	1995	Ice Age				
James Kei	3	2007	Future Sight				
James Paick	101	2009	Zendikar	2018	Dominaria		
James Ryman	87	2010	Rise of the Eldrazi	2016	Kaladesh		
James Zapata	16	2013	Magic 2014	2016	Oath of the Gatewatch		
Janet Aulisio	4	1997	Tempest			n/a	
Janine Johnston	14	1996	Mirage	2006	Time Spiral		
Jarreau Wimberly	3	2008	Shards of Alara				
Jason A. Engle	68	2010	Worldwake	2018	Core Set 2019		
Jason Alexander Behnke	3	1997	Tempest	1998	Stronghold		
Jason Chan	75	2007	Future Sight	2015	Commander 2015		
Jason Felix	101	2009	Zendikar	2018	Core Set 2019		
Jason Kang	18	2016	Oath of the Gatewatch	2018	Dominaria		
Jason Rainville	36	2014	Conspiracy	2016	Kaladesh		
Jasper Sandner	12	2012	Modern Masters	2015	Magic Origins		
Jean-Sébastien Rossbach	7	2007	Future Sight	2009	Alara Reborn		
Jeff A. Menges	56	1993	Alpha	1997	Tempest	n/a	
Jeff Easley	49	1999	Mercadian Masques	2008	Eventide		
Jeff Laubenstein	24	1997	Tempest	1999	Mercadian Masques	n/a	
Jeff Miracola	110	1996	Mirage	2008	Eventide		
Jeff Nentrup	2	2006	Coldsnap			here	
Jeff Reitz	1	1997	Tempest				
Jeff Remmer	2	2001	Odyssey				
Jeff Simpson	12	2014	Journey into Nyx	2016	Kaladesh		
Jeffrey R. Busch	10	1998	Portal Second Age			n/a	
Jehan Choo	4	2018	Masters 25	2018	Dominaria		
Jen Page	1	2005	Ravnica			n/a	
Jennifer Law	2	1996	Mirage			n/a	
Jeremy Enecio	5	2008	Shadowmoor	2008	Eventide		
Jeremy Jarvis	48	2003	Mirrodin	2009	Conflux		
Jerry Tiritilli	37	1997	Visions	2002	Onslaught	n/a	
Jesper Ejsing	131	2007	Lorwyn	2018	Core Set 2019		
Jesper Myrfors	56	1993	Alpha	1994	Fallen Empires		
Ji Yong	3	1999	Portal Three Kingdoms			n/a	
Jiaming	4	1999	Portal Three Kingdoms			n/a	
Jiang Zhuqing	3	1999	Portal Three Kingdoms			n/a	
Jim Murray	73	2004	Darksteel	2015	Magic Origins		
Jim Nelson	127	1997	Tempest	2010	Magic 2011		
Jim Pavelec	22	2004	Champions of Kamigawa	2011	Magic 2012		
Mark "JOCK" Simpson	3	1996	Mirage				
Joel Biske	11	1997	Tempest	2000	Prophecy	n/a	
Joel Thomas	11	2004	Champions of Kamigawa	2006	Coldsnap		
Johann Bodin	98	2010	Worldwake	2018	Core Set 2019		
Johannes Voss	60	2010	Scars of Mirrodin	2016	Kaladesh		With Jana Schirmer through Innistrad block.
John Avon	208	1996	Mirage	2017	Aether Revolt		
John Bolton	11	1996	Mirage	2004	Champions of Kamigawa		
John Coulthart	23	1996	Mirage	1997	Weatherlight		
John Donahue	2	2007	Future Sight			n/a	
John Gallagher	3	2001	7th Edition	2001	Apocalypse	n/a	
John Howe	13	2000	Prophecy	2008	Eventide		
John Malloy	2	1996	Mirage				
John Matson	106	1996	Alliances	2006	Time Spiral		
John Severin Brassell	23	2013	Dragon's Maze	2017	Amonkhet		
John Stanko	40	2010	Magic 2011	2016	Kaladesh		
John Zeleznik	10	1999	Urza's Destiny	2006	Time Spiral		
Jon Foster	19	2003	Mirrodin	2009	Magic 2010		
Jon J. Muth	5	1997	Visions	1998	Urza's Saga		
Jonas De Ro	37	2014	Born of the Gods	2017	Amonkhet		
Jonathan Kuo	10	2017	Ixalan	2018	Core Set 2019		
Jose Cabrera	3	2016	Shadows over Innistrad	2016	Eldritch Moon		
Joseph Meehan	25	2015	Dragons of Tarkir	2016	Kaladesh		
Josh Hass	8	2016	Eldritch Moon	2017	Amonkhet		
Joshua Hagler	7	2008	Eventide	2008	Shards of Alara		
Josu Hernaiz	17	2015	Magic Origins	2017	Amonkhet		
Julie Baroh	24	1993	Alpha	1997	Tempest		
Jung Park	52	2009	Zendikar	2016	Kaladesh		
Junich Inoue	3	1999	Portal Three Kingdoms			n/a	
Junior Tomlin	4	1996	Mirage			n/a	
Junko Taguchi	3	1999	Portal Three Kingdoms			n/a	
Justin Hampton	17	1994	Antiquities	1995	Ice Age		
Justin Murray	2	2007	Future Sight				
Justin Sweet	66	2001	Odyysey	2010	Magic 2011		
Kaja Foglio	63	1993	Arabian Nights	2004	Darksteel		
Kang Yu	4	1999	Portal Three Kingdoms				
Kari Johnson	2	1996	Mirage				
Karl Kopinski	178	2008	Shards of Alara	2020	Commander Legends		
Karla Ortiz	19	2013	Dragon's Maze	2016	Eldritch Moon		
Kathryn Rathke	3	1996	Mirage				
Keith Garletts	18	2001	Odyssey	2005	Ravnica		
Keith Parkinson	16	1998	Stronghold	1998	Portal Second Age		
Ken Meyer Jr	15	1994	Arabian Nights	1999	Tempest	www.kenmeyerjr.com	
Kensuke Okabayashi	7	2004	Champions of Kamigawa	2006	Coldsnap		
Kerstin Kaman	3	1994	Antiquities			n/a	
Kev Brockschmidt	4	1993	Alpha				
Kevin "Kev" Walker	436	1996	Mirage	2020	Double Masters	n/a	
Kevin Dobler	3	2003	Mirrodin	2004	Unhinged		
Kevin Murphy	2	1999	Mercadian Masques			n/a	
Khang Le	4	2004	Champions of Kamigawa	2007	Future Sight		
Kieran Yanner	49	2009	Magic 2010	2016	Kaladesh		
Kipling West	2	1997	Weatherlight				
Kirsten Zirngibl	3	2016	Kaladesh	2016	Aether Revolt		
Koji	2	1999	Portal Three Kingdoms				
Kristen Bishop	1	1993	Arabian Nights				
Ku Xueming	4	1999	Portal Three Kingdoms			n/a	
Kuang Sheng	3	1999	Portal Three Kingdoms			n/a	
L. A. Williams	28	1995	Ice Age	1999	Mercadian Masques		
LHQ	2	1999	Portal Three Kingdoms			n/a	
Lake Hurwitz	20	2015	Fate Reforged	2017	Amonkhet		
Larry Elmore	10	2000	Invasion	2001	Odyssey		
Larry MacDougall	27	2007	Lorwyn	2008	Eventide	n/a	
Lars Grant-West	83	2003	Legions	2017	Amonkhet		
Lawrence Snelly	8	1996	Alliances	1998	Urza's Saga		
Li Tie	4	1999	Portal Three Kingdoms	2000	Nemesis		
Li Wang	4	1999	Portal Three Kingdoms				
Li Xiaohua	4	1999	Portal Three Kingdoms			n/a	
Li Youliang	3	1999	Portal Three Kingdoms			n/a	
Li Yousong	4	1999	Portal Three Kingdoms			n/a	
Lie Tiu	1	1999	Portal Three Kingdoms			n/a	
Lin Yan	2	1999	Portal Three Kingdoms			n/a	
Lindsey Look	14	2014	Commander 2014	2017	Amonkhet		
Liu Jianjian	2	1999	Portal Three Kingdoms			n/a	
Liu Shangying	3	1999	Portal Three Kingdoms			n/a	
Lius Lasahido	33	2015	Fate Reforged	2017	Amonkhet		
Livia Prima	66	2018	Battlebond	2024	Modern Horizons 3		
Liz Danforth	34	1994	Legends	2006	Time Spiral		
Lou Harrison	1	2000	Nemesis			n/a	
Lubov	5	1998	Portal Second Age				
Luca Zontini	63	1999	Mercadian Masques	2007	Planar Chaos	n/a	
Lucas Graciano	59	2012	Dark Ascension	2017	Amonkhet		
Lucio Parrillo	10	2007	Future Sight	2008	Shadowmoor		
M. W. Kaluta	2	1998	Stronghold				
Magali Villeneuve	95	2013	Commander 2013	2018	Core Set 2019		
Marc Fishman	13	1999	Urza's Destiny	2001	Odyssey		
Marc Simonetti	7	2010	Scars of Mirrodin	2015	Dragons of Tarkir		
Marcelo Vignali	7	2003	Scourge	2006	Coldsnap		
Marco Nelor	28	2012	Magic 2013	2016	Shadows over Innistrad		
Margaret Organ-Kean	27	1994	Antiquities	2026	Lorwyn Eclipsed		
Mark Brill	38	1999	Urza's Legacy	2008	Shards of Alara		
Mark Harrison	3	1997	Weatherlight	2003	Mirrodin	n/a	
Mark A. Nelson	9	1998	Urza's Saga	2005	Ravnica		credited as Mark Nelson for early illustrations
Mark Poole	111	1993	Alpha	2015	Fate Reforged		
Mark Romanoski	27	1999	Mercadian Masques	2006	Coldsnap		
Mark Rosewater	1	1998	Unglued			N/A	
Mark Tedin	203	1993	Alpha	2022	Double Masters 2022		
Mark Winters	36	2013	Gatecrash	2016	Kaladesh		
Mark Zug	150	1998	Stronghold	2016	Kaladesh		
Martin McKenna	5	1996	Mirage				
Massimilano Frezzato	9	1999	Mercadian Masques	2001	7th Edition	n/a	Deceased
Mathias Kollros	59	2012	Return to Ravnica	2016	Conspiracy: Take the Crown		
Matt Cavotta	179	1999	Mercadian Masques	2011	Mirrodin Besieged		
Matt Stawicki	2	1998	Portal Second Age				
Matt Stewart	128	2007	Future Sight	2016	Kaladesh		
Matt Thompson	24	2002	Onslaught	2006	Guildpact	n/a	
Matthew D. Wilson	59	1997	Tempest	2004	Fifth Dawn		
Matthew Mitchell	4	2002	Judgment	2002	Onslaught	n/a	
Melissa A. Benson	62	1993	Alpha	1998	Portal: Second Age		
Miao Aili	3	1999	Portal Three Kingdoms			n/a	
Michael Bruinsma	9	2007	Future Sight	2008	Alara Reborn		
Michael Danza	3	1997	Visions				
Michael Koelsch	4	2001	7th Edition			n/a	
Michael Komarck	47	2007	Future Sight	2015	Battle for Zendikar		
Michael Phillippi	12	2005	Ravnica	2007	Future Sight		
Matteo Bassini	6	2019	Zendikar Rising	2022	Streets of New Capenna		
Michael Ryan	3	2008	Shards of Alara				
Michael Sutfin	81	1998	Stronghold	2008	Shadowmoor		
Michael Weaver	5	1998	Portal Second Age				
Michael Whelan	1	1994	Other				
Mike Bierek	72	2009	Magic 2010	2017	Amonkhet		
Mike Dringenberg	41	1996	Mirage	2008	Eventide	n/a	
Mike Kerr	5	1996	Mirage	1997	5th Edition	n/a	
Mike Kimble	19	1994	Legends	1996	Mirage	n/a	
Mike Ploog	30	1999	Mercadian Masques	2002	Judgment	n/a	
Mike Raabe	41	1995	Ice Age	2001	Planeshift		
Mike Sass	2	2001	7th Edition	2001	Apocalypse		
Min Yum	48	2011	New Phyrexia	2016	Kaladesh		
Miranda Meeks	1	2021	Planeswalker				
Mitch Cotie	7	2004	Champions of Kamigawa	2009	Alara Reborn		
Mitsuaki Sagiri	3	1999	Portal Three Kingdoms			n/a	
Monte Michael Moore	8	2001	7th Edition	2002	Onslaught		
Naomi Baker	6	2017	Ixalan	2018	Battlebond		
Nathalie Hertz	3	1997	Visions			n/a	
Nelson DeCastro	15	1999	Mercadian Masques	2002	Onlsaught		
Nene Thomas	21	1994	Antiquities	1995	Homelands		
Nick Percival	13	2005	Ravnica	2006	Coldsnap		
Nicola Leonard	21	1994	Legends	1997	Tempest		
Nils Hamm	151	2007	Future Sight	2022	Commander Legends: Battle for Baldur's Gate		
Noah Bradley	92	2012	Return to Ravnica	2018	Core Set 2019		
Nottsuo	13	2004	Darksteel	2006	Guildpact		
Omaha Pérez	1	1997	Visions				
Omar Rayyan	16	2007	Future Sight	2008	Shadowmoor		
Paolo Parente	125	1997	Tempest	2006	Guildpact		Often as "Parente"
Pat Lee	11	2004	Champions of Kamigawa	2006	Guildpact		
Pat Morrissey	31	1994	Fallen Empires	1999	Mercadian Masques	n/a	
Patrick Beel	2	1996	Mirage				
Patrick Ho	4	1999	Urza's Destiny			n/a	
Patrick Kochakji	2	1997	Weatherlight				
Paul Bonner	16	2008	Eventide	2010	Worldwake		
Paul Chadwick	1	2007	Lorwyn				
Paul Lee	3	1997	Visions	2009	Duel Decks: Garruk vs. Liliana	n/a	
Pete Venters	282	1994	Antiquities	2010	Magic 2011	n/a	
Peter Bollinger	7	2001	Planeshift	2001	7th Edition	n/a	
Peter Mohrbacher	49	2011	Commander	2015	Battle for Zendikar		
Phil Foglio	48	1994	Antiquities	1998	Portal: Second Age		
Philip Mosness	1	1995	Ice Age			n/a	
Philip Straub	14	2007	Future Sight	2015	Battle for Zendikar		
Philip Tan	2	2007	Lorwyn				
Phill Simmer	10	2013	Theros	2015	Dragons of Tarkir		
Piotr Dura	50	2019	War of the Spark	2021	Strixhaven		
Puddnhead	16	2003	8th Edition	2006	Time Spiral	n/a	
Qi Baocheng	7	1999	Portal Three Kingdoms			n/a	
Qiao Dafu	8	1999	Portal Three Kingdoms	1999	Mercadian Masques	n/a	also referred to as Zhao Dafu
Qin Jun	3	1999	Portal Three Kingdoms			n/a	
Qu Xin	6	1999	Portal Three Kingdoms			n/a	
Quan Xuejun	4	1999	Portal Three Kingdoms			n/a	
Quinton Hoover	73	1993	Alpha	2008	Morningtide		Deceased
Raf Sarmento	3	2015	FNM Promo	2015	Dragons of Tarkir		
Ralph Horsley	56	2004	Champions of Kamigawa	2015	Commander 2015		
Randy Asplund-Faith	24	1994	Antiquities	1996	Alliances		
Randy Elliott	19	1997	Tempest	2006	Time Spiral		
Randy Gallegos	204	1995	Ice Age	2023	Doctor Who		
Randy "rk" Post	117	1998	Exodus	2015	Commander 2015		
Randy Vargas	16	2017	Hour of Devastation	2018	Core Set 2019		
Raoul Vitale	30	2013	Dragon's Maze	2016	Kaladesh		
Ray Lago	27	1999	Urza's Destiny	2004	Unhinged	n/a	
Raymond Swanland	169	2007	Future Sight	2018	Duel Decks: Elves vs. Inventors		
Rebecca Guay	151	1996	Alliances	2009	Magic 2010		
Rebekah Lynn	1	2006	Coldsnap				
Richard Kane Ferguson	62	1994	Legends	2008	Eventide	n/a	
Richard Sardinha	16	2003	Scourge	2008	Shadowmoor		
Richard Thomas	44	1993	Alpha	1997	Tempest	n/e	
Richard Whitters	7	2008	Shadowmoor	2011	New Phyrexia		
Richard Wright	36	2005	Ravnica	2016	Kaladesh	n/a	
Rick Berry	7	1998	Urza's Saga				
Rick Emond	7	1995	Ice Age			n/a	
Rick Farrell	4	2001	Odyssey			n/a	
Rob Alexander	145	1993	Alpha	2016	Eternal Masters		
Robert Bliss	15	1996	Mirage	1998	Stronghold	n/a	
Robh Ruppel	5	1998	Urza's Saga	2010	Magic 2011		
Roger Raupp	42	1996	Mirage	2002	Onslaught		
Rogério Vilela	2	1997	Weatherlight			n/a	
Romas Kukalis	3	1997	Visions				
Ron Brown	6	2008	Shadowmoor	2008	Eventide		
Ron Chironna	4	1997	Tempest				
Ron Spencer	234	1993	Alpha	2010	Magic 2011		
Ron Walotsky	4	2001	Planeshift	2001	7th Edition	n/a	
Ruth Thompson	10	1995	Ice Age	1996	Alliances		
Ryan Alexander Lee	39	2014	Born of the Gods	2017	Amonkhet		
Ryan Barger	51	2012	Return to Ravnica	2016	Oath of the Gatewatch		
Ryan Pancoast	75	2009	Magic 2010	2016	Kaladesh		
Ryan Yee	55	2010	Magic 2011	2016	Kaladesh		
Sal Villagran	4	2008	Shards of Alara	2009	Alara Reborn		
Sam Guay	4	2021	Adventures in the Forgotten Realms				
Sam Wood	17	1998	Portal Second Age	2009	Magic 2010	n/a	
Sandra Everingham	42	1993	Alpha	1996	Alliances	n/a	
Sara Winters	28	2016	Kaladesh	2018	Battlebond		
Scott Altmann	10	2007	Future Sight	2008	Eventide	hre	
Scott Bailey	13	1999	Mercadian Masques	2001	7th Edition		
Scott M. Fischer	144	1996	Mirage	2015	Commander 2015		
Scott Hampton	18	1997	Visions	2008	Morningtide		
Scott Kirschner	43	1994	Legends	1998	Urza's Saga	n/a	
Scott Murphy	18	2014	Born of the Gods	2016	Kaladesh		
Sean McConnell	1	1999	Mercadian Masques				
Sean Murray	1	2016	Kaladesh				
Sean Sevestre	3	2016	Shadows over Innistrad	2016	Kaladesh		
Seb McKinnon	93	2012	Magic 2013	2019	Throne of Eldraine		
Shang Huitong	3	1999	Portal Three Kingdoms			n/a	
Shelly Wan	17	2008	Morningtide	2011	Mirrodin Besieged		
Shishizaru	25	2004	Champions of Kamigawa	2007	Future Sight		
Sidharth Chaturvedi	12	2016	Eldritch Moon	2017	Amonkhet		
Slawomir Maniak	134	2011	Innistrad	2018	Core Set 2019		
Solomon Au Yeung	3	1999	Portal Three Kingdoms			n/a	
Song Shikai	4	1999	Portal Three Kingdoms			n/a	
Stephanie Pui-Mun Law	3	2000	Invasion				credited as Stephanie Law
Stephen Daniele	29	1997	Tempest	2004	Unhinged		
Stephen L. Walsh	2	1997	Weatherlight			n/a	
Steve Argyle	84	2008	Shards of Alara	2018	Battlebond		
Steve Ellis	10	2007	Planar Chaos	2008	Ikoria		
Steve Firchow	3	1998	Urza's Saga				
Steve Luke	29	1996	Mirage	1997	Tempest	n/a	
Steve Prescott	203	2007	Planar Chaos	2022	Dominaria united		
Steve White	13	1996	Mirage	1998	Urza's Saga	n/a	
Steven Belledin	135	2006	Coldsnap	2017	Amonkhet		
Stuart Griffin	17	1996	Mirage	2006	Time Spiral	n/a	
Sue Ellen Brown	5	1997	Tempest				
Sun Nan	3	1999	Portal Three Kingdoms			n/a	
Sung Choi	6	2016	Kaladesh	2017	Amonkhet		
Susan Van Camp	47	1993	Arabian Nights	1997	Tempest		
Svetlin Velinov	214	2010	Worldwake	2018	Core Set 2019		
Tang Xiaogu	2	1999	Portal Three Kingdoms			n/a	
Ted Naifeh	11	1997	Portal	1997	Weatherlight		
Terese Nielsen	188	1996	Alliances	2016	Eldritch Moon		
Terry Springer	5	1999	Mercardian Masques				
Thomas M. Baxa	110	1997	Tempest	2009	Zendikar		
Thomas Denmark	12	2007	Lorwyn	2008	Eventide		
Thomas Gianni	30	1996	Mirage	2007	Future Sight		Deceased
Tianhua Xu	9	2015	Battle for Zendikar	2016	Eldritch Moon		
Tim Hildebrandt	107	1999	Urza's Destiny	2007	Future Sight		Often worked with twin brother Greg. Deceased
Titus Lunter	83	2014	Khans of Tarkir	2018	Battlebond		
Todd Lockwood	73	1999	Urza's Legacy	2016	Kaladesh		
Tom Babbey	1	2016	Kaladesh				
Tom Fleming	5	1998	Urza's Saga	1999	Urza's Legacy		
Tom Kyffin	16	1996	Mirage	1997	Tempest		
Tom Wänerstrand	69	1993	Alpha	2006	Time Spiral	n/a	
Tomas Giorello	11	2004	Fifth Dawn	2007	Planar Chaos	n/a	
Tomasz Jedruszek	63	2009	Worldwake	2017	Amonkhet		
Tommy Arnold	6	2016	Kaladesh	2017	Amonkhet		
Tony DiTerlizzi	89	1997	Visions	2004	Unhinged		
Tony Foti	10	2016	Kaladesh	2017	Amonkhet		
Tony Roberts	15	1996	Mirage	1997	5th Edition		
Tony Szczudlo	77	1999	Mercadian Masques	2006	Time Spiral	n/a	
Torstein Nordstrand	6	2014	Khans of Tarkir	2015	Magic Origins		
Trevor Claxton	42	2008	Shards of Alara	2014	Magic 2015		
Trevor Hairsine	26	2002	Onslaught	2008	Shards of Alara	n/a	
Tsutomu Kawade	19	2004	Champions of Kamigawa	2007	Future Sight	n/a	
Tyler Jacobson	67	2012	Return to Ravnica	2017	Amonkhet		
Una Fricker	43	1996	Mirage	2006	Time Spiral	n/a	
Val Mayerik	36	1997	Tempest	2008	Morningtide		
Vance Kovacs	48	2004	Darksteel	2014	Born of the Gods		
Victor Adame Minguez	61	2015	Magic Origins	2018	Core Set 2019		
Viktor Titov	24	2014	Khans of Tarkir	2016	Kaladesh		
Vincent Evans	4	1998	Urza's Saga			n/a	
Vincent Proce	69	2009	Zendikar	2016	Kaladesh		
Volkan Baga	140	2006	Coldsnap	2018	Core Set 2019		
Wang Chuxiong	3	1999	Portal Three Kingdoms			n/a	
Wang Feng	3	1999	Portal Three Kingdoms			n/a	
Wang Yuqun	5	1999	Portal Three Kingdoms			n/a	
Warren Mahy	65	2006	Guildpact	2012	Return to Ravnica		
Wayne England	111	2000	Prophecy	2016	Shadows over Innistrad	n/a	Deceased
Wayne Reynolds	153	2004	Champions of Kamigawa	2018	Dominaria		
Wesley Burt	52	2012	2017 Avacyn	Restored	Amonkhet		
William Donohoe	3	1996	Mirage			n/a	
William O'Connor	18	1997	Tempest	2008	Eventide		
William Simpson	21	1997	Portal	2015	Magic Origins		
Willian Murai	51	2013	Gatecrash	2016	Kaladesh		
Winona Nelson	115	2011	Innistrad	2018	Core Set 2019		
Wylie Beckert	4	2020	Core Set 2021	2020	Zendikar Rising		
Xi Zhang	2	2018	Kaladesh	2018	Masters 25		
Xu Tan	4	1999	Portal Three Kingdoms				
Xu Xiaoming	6	1999	Portal Three Kingdoms			n/a	
YW Tang	9	2014	Khans of Tarkir	2015	Dragons of Tarkir		
Yan Li	1	2015	Magic Origins				
Yang Guangmai	3	1999	Portal Three Kingdoms			n/a	
Yang Hong	3	1999	Portal Three Kingdoms				
Yang Jun Kwon	4	1999	Portal Three Kingdoms			n/a	
Yefim Kligerman	6	2014	Journey into Nyx	2016	Oath of the Gatewatch		
Yeong-Hao Han	89	2011	Commander	2018	Dominaria		
Yohann Schepacz	10	2014	Journey into Nyx	2016	Eldritch Moon		
Yokota Katsumi	2	2006	Coldsnap				
Yoshino Himori	2	2008	Duel Decks: Jace vs. Chandra	2008	Duel Decks: Jace vs. Chandra		
Zack Stella	81	2013	Modern Masters	2018	Core Set 2019		
Zak Plucinski	7	1996	Alliances	1997	5th Edition		
Zezhou Chen	11	2016	Shadows over Innistrad	2017	Amonkhet		
Zhang Jiazhen	3	1999	Portal Three Kingdoms			n/a	
Zhao Dafu	8	1999	Portal Three Kingdoms	1999	Mercadian Masques		see Qiao Dafu
Zhao Tan	2	1999	Portal Three Kingdoms			n/a	
Zina Saunders	29	1996	Mirage	1997	Tempest		
Zoltan Boros	199	2005	Ravnica	2017	Amonkhet		(often with Gabor Szikszai)

# = Number of artworks of the artist used for Magic cards (as found at Gatherer); First = Year and set of first artwork in Magic; Last = Year and set of most recent new artwork in Magic.
