= Susan Brown =

Susan or Sue Brown may refer to:

- Susan Brown (mathematician) (1937–2017), British professor of mathematics
- L. Susan Brown (born 1959), Canadian anarcha-feminist writer
- Susan Brown (minister) (born 1958), Scottish minister
- Susan Brown (English actress) (born 1946), English actress
- Susan Brown (American actress) (1932–2018), American actress
- Susan E. Brown, American medical anthropologist and nutritionist
- Sue Brown (cricketer) (born 1958), New Zealand cricketer
- Sue Brown (rowing) (born 1958), first woman to take part in The Boat Race (Oxford cox in 1981 and 1982)
- Sue Ellen Brown (born 1954), American artist
- Sue K. Brown (1948–2024), American diplomat, ambassador to Montenegro
- Sue M. Wilson Brown (1877–1941), African-American activist for women's suffrage
- Susan Brown (judge), judge of the Supreme Court of Queensland, Australia
