= Zhang Xi =

Zhang Xi or Xi Zhang may refer to:

- Zhang Xi (Tang dynasty), chancellor of the Chinese Tang dynasty
- Zhang Xi (PRC politician), the first Communist Party chief of Henan
- Zhang Xi (beach volleyball) (born 1985), female player from China
- Zhang Xi (chemist), scientist and member of the Chinese Academy of Sciences
- Xi Zhang (artist) (born 1984), Chinese-American artist
- Xi Zhang (professor)
