= Ferencik =

Ferencik is a surname. Notable people with the surname include:

- Erica Ferencik (born 1958), American novelist
- Milan Ferenčík (born 1991), Slovak footballer
