= Animorphs =

Science fantasy young adult book series

- The original cover of the first book in the series, entitled The Invasion, showing Jake as the protagonist.
- Author: K. A. Applegate
- Cover artist: David Burroughs Mattingly
- Country: United States
- Language: English
- Genre: Science fantasy; Thriller
- Publisher: Scholastic Publishing
- Published: June 1996 – May 2001 (original run); May 2011 – September 2012 (re-issue)
- Media type: Print (hardcover and paperback), audiobook
- No. of books: 54 main series books; 10 companion books; 6 graphic novels (List of books)

Animorphs is a science fantasy series of middle grade books written by K. A. Applegate (see authorship below) and published by Scholastic. It is told in first person, with all six main characters taking turns narrating the books through their own perspectives. The core themes of the series are horror, war, imperialism, dehumanization, sanity, morality, innocence, leadership, freedom, family, and growing up.

Published between June 1996 and May 2001, the series consists of 54 books and includes ten companion books, eight of which fit into the series' continuity (the Animorphs Chronicles and Megamorphs books) and two that are gamebooks not fitting into the continuity (the Alternamorphs books).

The books were adapted into a television series of the same name on Nickelodeon, YTV and Global, which ran from 1998 to 1999. The series has also been adapted to audiobook form as well as a series of graphic novels starting in 2020. A second television adaptation was announced in 2026.

== Plot summary ==
The story revolves around five teenage humans: Jake, Marco, Cassie, Rachel, Tobias, and one alien, Aximili-Esgarrouth-Isthill (nicknamed Ax), who obtain the ability to transform into any animal they touch. Naming themselves "Animorphs" (a portmanteau of "animal morphers"), they use their ability to battle a secret infiltration of Earth by a parasitic race of aliens resembling large slugs called Yeerk. Yeerks can take any living creature as a host by entering and merging with their brain through the ear canal. The Animorphs fight as a guerrilla force against the Yeerks, led by Visser Three, who uses an Andalite (a centaur-like race of aliens, which Ax belongs to) as a host.

Throughout the series, the Animorphs carefully protect their identities; the Yeerks assume that the Animorphs are a strike force of Andalites, the aliens who created the transformation technology, sent to prevent the Yeerks from conquering Earth. The Animorphs maintain this façade to protect their families from Yeerk reprisals.

Though the Animorphs can assume the form of any animal they touch to acquire the DNA, there are several limitations to the ability. The most vital is that they cannot stay in animal form for more than two hours, or they will be unable to return to human form and the morphs become permanent. The Andalite term for this is "Nothlit". Others include having to demorph back to human in between morphs, only tight clothing being able to be carried over with a morph, DNA allergies that can lose some control of the morphing ability, and having to consistently maintain concentration during a morph to prevent the animal's natural instincts from overwhelming their human intellect. A benefit to morphing is that it allows the team to heal any superficial, non-genetic injury, sustained as a human or in a morph. Also, while in morph, they can telepathically communicate with anyone nearby in what they call 'thought-speak'.

== Development ==
=== Writing ===
The series was originally conceived as a three-part series called The Changelings, in which Jake was named Matt, and his little brother Joseph took the place of Cassie.

In an interview with Publishers Weekly, Katherine Applegate talked about the source of inspiration and realization for the Animorphs series: "I grew up loving animals and lived with the usual suburban menagerie of dogs, cats and gerbils", she said "I really wanted to find a way to get kids into the heads of various species and decided that a science-fiction premise was the way to do this". Applegate tried to accurately depict the various animals, and did research such as visiting "a raptor center where they rehabilitate injured birds". "When Tobias becomes a hawk, I want the reader to see the world as a hawk might see it—to soar on the warm breezes and hurtle toward the ground to make a kill", she said.

To develop the characters for Animorphs, Applegate would go through teenage magazines such as YM and Seventeen (both of which are referenced in the books when describing Rachel), cutting out pictures and piecing them together to get an idea of what sort of children the Animorphs would look like. Applegate stated in an interview online that many of the names for her alien creatures, races, and locations are actually scrambled names of local street signs or companies that she happens to notice. For instance, the word nothlit was derived from the hotel name Hilton. In another interview, Applegate stated that she originally wanted the alien Andalite to have more standard and familiar forms, but was told by Scholastic to be more creative with the designs, which led to her giving them such a distinctive look.

According to the Anibase (an officially-produced, Flash-based piece of software once available on the official Animorphs website with detailed information about each book), Applegate did not make up the titles for the Animorphs books: it was up to the Scholastic editors to create the titles for the books based on the outlines provided by the author, having to select a word that not only fit the book's storyline, but sounded good with the characteristic "The" preface. One of the author's favorite books, The Lord of the Rings, lent several words and images to Animorphs: the Sindarin plural word for Orc, "yrch", became Yeerk; the flaming red Eye of Sauron inspired the Crayak, and Ax's middle name, "Esgarrouth", is based on a town in the books called Esgaroth. The human name of Ax's brother, Elfangor, is Alan Fangor and his last name is in reference to the Fangor region or Fangorn Forest. Also there was a minor reference to Gondor, in the form of a fictional company named "Gondor Industries" in the 14th book.

==== Authorship ====
Animorphs is published under the name "K.A. Applegate", and was created by husband-and-wife co-authors Katherine Applegate and Michael Grant, though Katherine Applegate is often presented as the single author. Grant described their division of work as running "anything from 50/50 to 90/10". Later graphic novel adaptations were "based on the novels by K.A. Applegate and Michael Grant".

Due to many contributing factors—such as the birth of their child and the difficulties involved in writing Everworld (which was originally intended to be mostly ghostwritten, like Applegate's third Scholastic series Remnants), many of the novels from the #25-#52 range were written by ghostwriters. Typically, Applegate would write a detailed outline for each book, and a ghostwriter, usually one of Applegate's former editors or writing protégés, would spend a month or two writing the actual novel. After this, Applegate, and later series editor, Tonya Alicia Martin, would edit the book to make it fit in with the series' tight continuity. Ghostwriters are credited for their help in the book's dedication page: "The author would like to thank [ghostwriter name] for his/her help in preparing this manuscript".

The following books in the series were ghostwritten:

- #25: The Extreme – Jeffrey Zeuhlke
- #27: The Exposed – Laura Battyanyi-Weiss (Due to an editorial oversight, Battyanyi-Weiss was uncredited for this book.)
- #28: The Experiment – Amy Garvey
- #29: The Sickness – Melinda Metz
- #30: The Reunion – Elise Donner
- #31: The Conspiracy – Laura Battyanyi-Weiss
- #33: The Illusion – Ellen Geroux
- #34: The Prophecy – Melinda Metz
- #35: The Proposal – Jeffrey Zeuhlke
- #36: The Mutation – Erica Bobone
- #37: The Weakness – Elise Smith
- #38: The Arrival – Kimberly Morris
- #39: The Hidden – Laura Battyanyi-Weiss
- #40: The Other – Gina Gascone
- #41: The Familiar – Ellen Geroux
- #42: The Journey – Emily Costello
- #43: The Test – Ellen Geroux
- #44: The Unexpected – Lisa Harkrader
- #45: The Revelation – Ellen Geroux
- #46: The Deception – Elise Donner
- #47: The Resistance – Ellen Geroux
- #48: The Return – Kimberly Morris (Due to an editorial oversight, Lisa Harkrader was mistakenly credited for this book.)
- #49: The Diversion – Lisa Harkrader
- #50: The Ultimate – Kimberly Morris
- #51: The Absolute – Lisa Harkrader
- #52: The Sacrifice – Kimberly Morris
- Alternamorphs #1 – unknown
- Alternamorphs #2 – Emily Costello

=== Cover art ===
The covers for 55 books in the series were designed by David B. Mattingly. He used the software Elastic Reality for the morphing effect. According to Mattingly, Scholastic was not satisfied with the first two book covers. Then-Creative Director David Tommasino knew Mattingly had experience working digitally and reached out to him. Mattingly had never done a morph before, but ordered a copy of Elastic Reality and completed a sample within two days, which eventually became the cover for book #3: The Encounter.

Each of Mattingly's covers took two weeks to create, from pencil sketch to finished digital render and required painting, since the Elastic Reality program produced smeared or stretched material. Mattingly would do the covers first, then the cutbacks. Since Scholastic wanted the covers to feature photorealistic humans, model reference photos were taken by photographer Addie Passen at her Union Square studio. According to Paige Tiffany, the model for most of Rachel's books, each photoshoot would only take between 30 and 60 minutes. Due to most of the models aging out, only Cassie's model was used continuously throughout the series.

The covers not designed by Mattingly are issues #1: The Invasion (designed by Peter Bollinger), #2: The Visitor (designed by Tim O'Brien), #9: The Secret, #10: The Android and #12: The Reaction (each designed by Damon C. Torres & The I-Way Company). In addition, Romas Kukalis provided cover art for the limited Animorphs Chronicles series. Mattingly used Kukalis' version of the Andalites as reference for his covers.

== Characters ==
=== Animorphs ===
- Jake: Jake Berenson is the leader of Animorphs. His battle morph is a tiger, and his flight morph is a peregrine falcon. Despite being a natural leader, he's reluctant to accept the role. The war takes on a deeper meaning for Jake when he finds out that his older brother Tom has been taken over by a Yeerk; this is one of his main motivations, preventing him from cracking under the pressure of making life-or-death decisions throughout the series. He is the only member of the team to have some relationship with all of the other human members prior to the war: Jake and Rachel are cousins, he and Marco have been best friends since early childhood, he is one of the few people who treats Tobias kindly, and he and Cassie have always had an attraction to each other. Jake and Cassie share their first kiss in book 26 and are in a relationship throughout the second half of the series.
- Rachel: Rachel has the most warrior-like and, as the series progresses, increasingly bloodthirsty nature in the group, earning her the nickname of "Xena, Warrior Princess". Her battle morphs are an African elephant and grizzly bear, and her flight morph is a bald eagle. She is also good at gymnastics and has an interest in fashion. She is Jake's cousin and Cassie's best friend, although her mindset often conflicts with Cassie's pacifist mindset. She and Tobias develop an attraction for one another during the series. She also has two younger sisters, Jordan and Sara. In the television series adaptation, her morph is a male lion as opposed to this being the battle morphs of David and James.
- Tobias: Tobias has low self-esteem and was often bullied in school before becoming an Animorph. An orphan, he lives with his aunt and uncle, who share custody of him. Tobias becomes trapped in a red-tailed hawk form in the first book. During the series, he regains the power to morph, but with his natural form remaining a hawk. Even though Rachel wants him to morph back into a human permanently, he keeps the hawk form in order to retain his morphing powers and continue fighting the Yeerks. Tobias admires Jake because Jake always showed him respect and kindness when no one else did. Also, Tobias develops a close friendship with Ax.
- Cassie: Cassie lives on a farm with her parents, who are veterinarians. Her battle morph is a wolf, and her flight morph is an osprey. She is African-American and the most knowledgeable about animals; also, she is an environmentalist. Her best friend is Rachel, despite the disparity in their personalities and lifestyles. Cassie loves nature and animals. She is also an estreen, the Andalite term for someone who is naturally talented at morphing.
- Marco: Marco is the source of comic relief in the series and Jake's best friend. His battle morph is a gorilla, and his flight morph is an osprey. He is Latin-American, and he also coined the term "Animorphs". Marco often proposes the most direct solution to any problem, even if it involves sacrifice. He lives with his father, who is depressed about his mother's apparent death in a boating accident. At first, he does not want to fight the Yeerks because he fears his father will not survive without him. He changes his mind when he discovers his mother is still alive as the host body for Visser One, the leader of the Yeerk invasion. In the television adaptation, his morph is a wolf rather than Cassie.
- Aximili-Esgarrouth-Isthill ("Ax"): Aximili-Esgarrouth-Isthill is an Andalite who is thought to be the only survivor of a bloody battle that took place in outer space. His flight morph is a Northern harrier. His ship has crash landed on Earth. He is the younger brother of Prince Elfangor-Sirinial-Shamtul, who gave the Animorphs their morphing ability moments before dying. He considers Jake a prince and is a strong friend of Tobias. The human Animorphs call him 'Ax' for the sake of easily pronouncing his name.

=== Other main characters ===
- Visser Three: Born as Esplin 9466 Primary and later promoted to Visser One, is the leader of the Yeerk forces on Earth and the primary antagonist of the series. He believed the planet was his inheritance from Edriss 562, his predecessor as Visser One. Sadistic and cruel, Visser Three has a penchant for torture and possesses the body of a full-grown Andalite warrior, Alloran-Semitur-Corrass. Esplin 9466 is the only Yeerk who has an Andalite host. Therefore, Visser Three also has the Andalite's ability to change their form by morphing. Throughout the series, Visser Three shows his acquisition of exceptionally powerful forms from many different planets, which he morphs into. During the final arc of the series, he is promoted to Visser One, when his predecessor is sentenced to execution.
- Ellimist: Seemingly all-powerful, a supernatural being which intermittently helps the Animorphs, including giving Tobias the ability to morph again. He acts to avoid direct involvement in the war to escape antagonizing Crayak, his evil counterpart, because that combat would cause galactic destruction. He subtly orchestrated many events which are key to the series. In The Ellimist Chronicles, it is revealed that Ellimist was once simply a member of an avian race, which by adaptive selection became a drastically different being.
- Crayak: Ellimist's arch-enemy which seeks absolute control over all intelligent life. He develops a personal vendetta against Jake after Jake ruins his species of soldiers, the Howlers. Ellimist claimed that Crayak originated in another galaxy, from where a greater power drove him out; The Ellimist Chronicles details Crayak's early conflict with Ellimist prior to the evolution of both beings to acquire seemingly limitless power.

=== Secondary characters ===
- Andalites:
  - Aldrea-Iskillion-Falan – Aldrea is the daughter of Prince Seerow, a main character in Animorphs #34: The Prophecy and the heroine in The Hork-Bajir Chronicles. She has a strong personality mixed with a desire to do the right thing, not necessarily what is easy. Born an Andalite, her father Seerow gave the Yeerks' technology that they used to leave their home planet and begin their quest to dominate the universe. Her family was eventually sent to the Hork-Bajir home planet, where she bonded with an unusually intelligent Hork-Bajir named Dak Hamee. Aldrea obtained the ability to morph shortly after the technology was developed, and used it to fight the Yeerk invasion of the Hork-Bajir world after her family was murdered. She and Dak led the resistance, and a strong bond developed between the two of them. She eventually, though accidentally, became a Hork-Bajir female permanently, and she and Dak fell deeply in love, married and had a son named Seerow. Despite their resistance efforts, they were both eventually killed and their son was infested by the Yeerks, though his line later gave rise to the leaders of the free Hork-Bajir on Earth. A copy of Aldrea's memories and personality made before her death was later temporarily implanted in Cassie in order to gain access to a cache of Yeerk weapons stolen and hidden by Aldrea and the Hork-Bajir resistance on the Hork-Bajir homeworld.
  - Alloran-Semitur-Corrass – Andalite host body of Visser Three. Alloran was an officer under Prince Seerow, who relieved his superior of duty after a force of Yeerks stole Andalite ships and left their planet thanks to technology provided to them by Seerow. Years later, having been promoted to the rank of War Prince, Alloran was placed in command of the Andalite forces sent to fight the Yeerk invasion of the Hork-Bajir homeworld. Unfortunately, the desperate situation on the planet led Alloran to decide that wiping out the Hork-Bajir with a virus was a better alternative than allowing them to be enslaved, and countless members of the species died as a result. Alloran was subsequently disgraced, and ended up serving on the crew of the same ship that Elfangor was assigned to as a junior officer. A mission that the pair went on with Elfangor's peer Arbron and a pair of humans led to Alloran's infestation by the Yeerk who would become Visser Three, who used Alloran's morphing abilities for many vile purposes throughout the years. After an attempt by Ax to kill Visser Three, Alloran was briefly left free to communicate with him, and encouraged him to continue the fight. Eventually he was freed from his infestation.
  - Elfangor-Sirinial-Shamtul – Elfangor is the first alien the Animorphs meet in the series. He gives them the power to morph minutes before his death. His adventures are highlighted in the book called The Andalite Chronicles, which takes place before the main Animorphs series. He was a war prince, and the older brother of Aximili-Esgarrouth-Isthill. He was the sworn enemy of Visser Three, and – due to time spent as a human – the father of Tobias.
- Auxiliary Animorphs: These are seventeen teenagers recruited from hospitals and rehabilitation centers where they are being treated for chronic diseases or learning to live with disabilities, the expectation being that the Yeerks would not want their bodies as hosts. The ability to morph restored some of the teenagers' bodies to perfect health, but failed to when the diseases or conditions were genetic. They are all killed in the final conflicts, providing a distraction for the main Animorphs.
- David: A boy who joins the Animorphs after learning their secret. The Animorphs trust him at first, giving him the ability to morph and fight with them rather than allow the Yeerks to take him, but he betrays them. He comes to reason that it is morally okay to attempt to kill the Animorphs while they are morphed, as they are not humans during that time. Ultimately, they are forced to trick him into morphing into a rat and trap him permanently in the morph, leaving him stranded on an island only inhabited by rats. He returns later in the series, eventually asking Rachel to kill him. Whether Rachel kills David or not has never been established.
- Drode: The Drode is an alien creature, described as being similar to a very dark purple dinosaur with wrinkled, pruny skin, and an oddly humanoid face. Little is known of the Drode, but it serves Crayak and usually shows up when he does.
- Erek King: Erek King is a member of the Chee, a pacifistic android race created by an alien race called the Pemalites. After the destruction of the Pemalites at the hands of the Howlers, Erek, along with the rest of the Chee, escaped to Earth. They have lived on the planet for thousands of years, using incredibly advanced holographic technology to pass as human.
- Hork-Bajir:
  - Toby Hamee – Leader of the Free Hork-Bajir on Earth; a Seer or exceptionally intelligent member of the Hork-Bajir race.
  - Jara Hamee – Toby's father and the descendant of Dak Hamee, a Hork-Bajir Seer, and Aldrea, an Andalite-turned-Hork-Bajir who led the Hork-Bajir resistance against the Yeerks. He was killed in action during the final battle.
  - Ket Halpak - Toby's mother and Jara Hamee's wife.
- Howlers: A race of killers artificially created by Crayak and deployed as shock troopers against the inhabitants of various worlds. Seven of them were selected by Crayak to be pitted against the Animorphs and Erek the Chee in a contest between the Ellimist and Crayak concerning the fate of an offshoot of the Yeerk race who had found an alternative means of living. Jake eventually discovered that the Howlers were children, too young to understand what they were doing and seeing it all as a game, and the Animorphs managed to infect their collective memory with a flashback of Jake and Cassie kissing. The Howlers were thus ruined as a soldier race.
- The One: An alien being who assimilates other beings; he makes a deal with the defeated Yeerks. He is the final antagonist of the series.
- Tom Berenson: Jake's older brother, a Controller. His original Yeerk is promoted and meant to receive another host early in the series, but ends up in Jake instead; it subsequently dies, while Tom receives another Yeerk. This Yeerk eventually stole the cube that provided the morphing power to the Animorphs and delivered it to his fellow Yeerks, and was later subsequently killed by Rachel.
- Homer: A Golden Retriever who is the family pet of Jake and is also his first morph.
- Hedrick Chapman: Vice-principal of the Animorphs' school and a Controller.
- Yeerks: The main antagonists, described as small, slug-like parasitic aliens that enter various organisms' brains through the ear canal to control their behavior. They are dependent upon Kandrona rays to survive, and must leave their hosts every three days in order to enter a Yeerk pool where they may absorb these rays.
  - Edriss 562 – Edriss 562 is a Yeerk that controls Marco's mother Eva. For most of the series, her rank is Visser One. She is the subject of the novel Visser, which describes her rise to and dramatic fall from power. She is the highest ranking of all the Yeerks in their military, and is only surpassed in importance by the Council of Thirteen. She is killed by Marco after being forced to leave Eva's body.
  - Aftran 942 – Aftran 942 is a Yeerk that initially controls a young girl named Karen until Cassie learns of her secret. She believes that it is unfair that Yeerks should be forced to either live in the mind of a host or nearly senseless in their own bodies and, after briefly controlling Cassie to prove that her intentions are pure, agrees to no longer take host bodies and work for peace. She founds the Yeerk Peace Movement and is to be executed until she is rescued by the Animorphs. Rather than die of Kandrona starvation, she is given the ability to morph and agrees to trap herself as a humpback whale.

== Publication ==
Each book in the series revolved around a given event during the war waged between the Animorphs and the invading Yeerks. Within a year and a half after the first book was published, the series had close to ten million copies in print, with Scholastic claiming a "stronger initial sell-in" than any of its other series up to that time. The series debut was preceded by a large marketing campaign which included posters on buildings, giveaway items in bookstores, and ads on Nickelodeon TV.

=== American editions ===
In the United States, the books were most popular as A5-sized paperback volumes. They were usually between 150 and 200 pages long, divided into just under 30 chapters.

The front covers featured images of the narrating Animorph undergoing the various stages of one of the morphs from the story, with a few exceptions. Behind the morphing character were images of clouds and skies, which became more colorful and elaborate as the series progressed. All the covers of the regular series books had a small cutout over part of the full morph's anatomy, revealing a computer-generated illustration on the first page, which was printed on glossy paper. The illustration shared the image of the full morph with the front cover, but placed within an environment from the story. The book spines repeated the narrating character's face from the front cover, and the spine color changed with every new book, resulting in a very colorful collection when viewed from any angle. A small excerpt from one of the book's chapters was printed on the inside of every front cover. As of the eighth book, The Alien, the Animorphs logo, the author's name, and the book's title were printed in glossy, metallic-looking ink, rather than the flat colors that had been used for the first seven books. In addition, the author's name and book title were surrounded by solid black rectangles. The majority of the books in the series were printed only in "metallic-ink editions". All further reprintings of the first seven books had this treatment applied to them as well.

The books in the series' final arc, beginning with the 45th book, The Revelation had yet another treatment applied to the cover, a variation on the new metallic style; the change affected only the main 'Animorphs' logo: instead of consisting of white letters superimposed on a metallic, colored background, the last ten books featured a logo with colored letters over a dark grey background, in contrast with the white logo background from the series' "opening arc". The final book, #54 The Beginning had a unique cover style, with the logo consisting of a glowing outline.

Every book featured an introduction to the series on the back cover, in the voice of Jake, one of the Animorphs.

We can't tell you who we are. Or where we live. It's too risky, and we've got to be careful. Really careful. So we don't trust anyone. Because if they find us... well, we just won't let them find us. The thing you should know is that everyone is in really big trouble. Yeah. Even you.

As of book 51, The Absolute, the introduction read as follows:

Here's the deal these days: They know exactly who we are. They know exactly where we live. We've got a few secrets left, and we're gonna use them. But just know that the end is coming. And we don't know how much longer we can do this. How much longer can we fight. What about you? Where will you be when it ends? Think about it. Think hard. Because the countdown has already begun...

In addition to this text, each book also carried an introduction, or teaser, to its own storyline.

Another feature of the books was a flipbook composed of the bottom right-hand corners of all of the book's pages. A step of the cover morph was printed on each page, less than an inch tall, in black-and-white. When the pages were flipped from front to back, the narrating Animorph could be seen morphing into the animal.

==== 2011 rereleases ====
In 2010, Scholastic announced plans to re-release the series with new lenticular covers and updated pop culture references. The re-release lasted from May 2011 to September 2012, ending after #8: The Alien due to tepid sales. These did not feature the flipbooks seen in the original run, likely due to different models being used for the covers.

==== 2026 rereleases ====
In 2026, the first three books in the series were reprinted with new covers. These use the text from the 2011 versions, and do not feature the original run's flipbooks.

=== International editions ===
The Animorphs series was printed in over twenty-five languages and other English-language markets, and the books in those countries sometimes had different designs, layouts, cover quotes, and even different cover morphs, as is the case for the fifth book, The Predator, whose UK edition showed Marco morphing into a lobster, in contrast to the American edition's gorilla morph. Japanese-language covers were hand-drawn; The Invasion showed Jake morphing into his dog Homer, a morph that was featured on the cover of The Threat in the American editions. Gallimard Jeunesse is the French publisher and Tammi is the Finnish publisher. The German publisher, Ravensburger, has also published some of the volumes as audio plays.

== Books ==
The series consists of fifty four main books and ten companion books. Among the companion books, eight are in the story line - four Megamorphs and four Chronicles. Two of the companion books do not fit in the story, because they are gamebooks - Alternamorphs.

== Toys ==
The Animorphs toy line was introduced in 1999 by Hasbro. They were marketed as part of the Transformers series, despite there being no in-universe connection between the two franchises. The Animorphs toy line was poorly received and commercially unsuccessful, leading to the line's cancellation by Hasbro. Several models from the Animorphs toy line were repurposed and released as part of the Transformers: Beast Wars line.

== Adaptations ==
=== Television series ===
An Animorphs television series ran from September 1998 to March 2000 comprising 26 episodes over two seasons. These aired on YTV and Global (second season) in Canada and Nickelodeon in the United States. It was executively produced by Deborah A. Forte and Bill Siegler, and was filmed in Toronto, Canada. The animals were supplied by the Bowmanville Zoo. This series makes several changes to the books with the names of Marco's father Peter being changed to Jeremy, Jake's mother and father, Jean and Steve being changed to Nikki and Greg, and Cassie's mother Michelle being Aisha, as well as other plot changes, such as the morphs, with Jake's morph being a white tiger, Rachel being a male lion (rather than being the battle morph of James and David in the books) instead of an elephant and grizzly bear, Marco being a wolf (rather than Cassie) instead of a gorilla, and Tobias being a Harris's hawk rather than a red-tailed hawk, and most of the others, like marine animals, insects, and arachnids being omitted, due to budget, practical, logistical and safety issues of filming certain dangerous species because these are too expensive and couldn't be trained or handled during production, and limiting the number of morphs to cheaper and safer alternatives, such as smaller and domesticated animals, like cats, dogs, horses, llamas, ducks, rats, and ferrets, as well as to avoid the difficulties of filming underwater scenes.

On April 3, 2026, it was announced that Ryan Coogler's production company Proximity Media had acquired the rights to the book series to be turned into a television series for Disney+ with 20th Television. Bayan Wolcott was attached as writer and executive producer, and Sev Ohanian, Coogler, and his wife Zinzi Coogler serving as executive producers on behalf of Proximity Media. Iole Lucchese and Caitlin Friedman were announced to executive produce via Scholastic. Proximity Media’s Simone Harris and Dezi Gallegos were also announced to oversee the project.

=== Film ===
In September 2015, several film websites began reporting rumors that Universal Pictures had plans to adapt the book series into a film, based on a report by the film website The Tracking Board. The site also claimed that Universal would be working with Silvertongue Films, a production house launched to develop Scholastic books into feature films, and that Deborah Forte would be producing.

In June 2020, it was formally announced that an Animorphs film would be produced by Scholastic Entertainment and Picturestart, the latter run by Erik Feig and Lucy Kitada. Script development would be overseen by Caitlin Friedman and Royce Reeves Darby.

Animorphs authors Katherine Applegate and Michael Grant initially agreed to collaborate on the project, but in October 2020 Grant announced via Twitter that he and Applegate would not be a part of the film's production, citing "creative differences". Grant later clarified his remark, wishing the producers the best and noting he and Applegate simply were not being involved enough in the production process. Ultimately, the project never materialized.

=== Video games ===
Animorphs: Know the Secret is an action-adventure game, released for Microsoft Windows. Developed by Gigawatt Studios and published by Infogrames, it lets the player to switch control between four of the Animorphs (Cassie, Jake, Marco and Rachel). They will explore different environments searching for clues as to why the activities of Yeerks have gone down. The Animorphs have access to a number of specific forms they can change into, which can increase by finding more animals on the way.

Animorphs: Shattered Reality is a platform video game, released for PlayStation. Developed by SingleTrac, it revolves around four of the Animorphs trying to find pieces of the Continuum Crystal before Visser Three does.

Animorphs for the Game Boy Color was published by Ubi Soft.

=== Audiobooks ===
In 2020, Scholastic Audio began releasing an uncut audio version of the series on Audible. Books 1 and 2 were released on January 7, 2020, with subsequent releases on the first or second Tuesday of each month for 5 months. There was a brief hiatus, then books 11 and 12 were released on January 26, 2021, following the same pattern. After another hiatus, 21 and 22 were released on November 8, 2021, following the same way. Since June 2022, Books 31 and on have been released on the first Tuesday of every month. Six narrators are used, one for each of the main characters. MacLeod Andrews narrates Jake (and Elfangor, for The Andalite Chronicles), Emily Ellet for Rachel, Michael Crouch for Tobias, Sisi Aisha Johnson for Cassie, Ramón de Ocampo for Marco, and Adam Verner for Ax. Mark Bramhall narrates as Jake's Civil War ancestor Isaiah Fitzhenry for parts of book #47, The Resistance. The narrators of The Hork-Bajir Chronicles are Michael Crouch, Natasha Soudek, Mark Turetsky, and Bahni Turpin. The narrator of Visser is Suzanne Elise Freeman, and the narrator of The Ellimist Chronicles is Scott Brick.

=== Graphic novels ===
Scholastic announced plans to launch a graphic novel adaptation of Animorphs via its Scholastic Graphix imprint. The first release, adapting The Invasion, was released on October 6, 2020, with art by Eisner-Award nominee Chris Grine. The second novel, adapting The Visitor, was released on October 5, 2021. The third novel, adapting The Encounter, was released on October 4, 2022. The fourth novel, adapting The Message, was released on December 5, 2023. The fifth novel, adapting The Predator, was released on August 20, 2024. The sixth and final novel, adapting The Capture, was released on March 4, 2025.
