= Noah Bradley =

American artist

Noah Bradley is an artist known for his work on Dungeons & Dragons, Magic: The Gathering and his The Sin of Man project. In 2020 he admitted to multiple incidents of sexual misconduct, resulting in Wizards of the Coast and Fantasy Flight Games, among others, stating they condemned Bradley's actions and would cut all ties with him for being a sexual predator.

== Education and career ==
Bradley attended Rhode Island School of Design before transferring to and graduating from Virginia Commonwealth University. He had a feature at GenCon Indy 2013.

His first commission by Wizards of the Coast was for a set of five basic lands released in Magic 2013.

== Sexual misconduct ==
On June 21, 2020, Bradley posted a note on Twitter acknowledging and apologizing for being in his words a "creepy sexual predator" after a female concept artist in the industry posted accusations on Twitter alluding to him, and several other women also came forward. As of June 2020, no charges had been pressed against Bradley for any of the allegations. After the scandal broke in June 2020, Wizards of the Coast announced they were cutting off business relations with him: they would not commission new art from him, and would not include previously commissioned art in future reprints. Fantasy Flight Games also released a similar statement cutting all ties with Bradley.

In 2021, Bradley wrote on his website about his sexual misconduct and its effects on his career.

== See also ==
- List of Magic: The Gathering artists
