= Animorphs Chronicles =

Spin-offs of the Animorphs book series

The Animorphs Chronicles
- 4
- Author: K. A. Applegate
- Illustrator: Romas Kukalis (cover art)
- Country: United States
- Language: English
- Genre: Science fiction
- Publisher: Scholastic
- Published: 1997–2000
- Preceded by: Animorphs

The Animorphs Chronicles is a series of four companion books to the Animorphs series written by K. A. Applegate. They explore and expand upon concepts that were briefly defined in the series, and detail the backstories of characters that were introduced. Four Chronicles books were published: The Andalite Chronicles in 1997, The Hork-Bajir Chronicles in 1998, Visser in 1999, and The Ellimist Chronicles in 2000. The Chronicles books differ from the Animorphs series because they are mostly told from the largely unfamiliar aliens' perspectives instead of the human characters. All four books feature artwork by Romas Kukalis on their covers.

== The Andalite Chronicles ==
The Andalite Chronicles takes place before and leading up to the events in The Invasion. It is narrated by Elfangor-Sirinial-Shamtul, or, as he is later known, Prince Elfangor. It begins with him uploading his memory into the computer before facing Visser Three at the abandoned construction site. The rest of the book is then a flashback of Elfangor's personal history, beginning with him as an Aristh, a warrior in training, and ending with him at the construction site.

Elfangor and his fellow aristh Arbron rescued two humans from the Skrit Na: Loren and Hedrick Chapman. They were assigned to return them to Earth under the leadership of a disgraced War-Prince, Alloran-Semitur-Corrass. However, upon realizing the Skrit Na were in possession of the mythical Time Matrix, they were forced to go after it. Arbron became trapped as a Taxxon, and Elfangor became responsible for Alloran's infestation. Eventually, Elfangor, Alloran and the Yeerk controlling him, and the humans fell into a black hole. They were forced to use the Time Matrix to escape, which took them to a fragmented universe created from Elfangor, Loren, and the Yeerk (now Visser Thirty-Two)'s memories. Elfangor and Loren were able to escape to Earth, where he permanently morphed a human and stayed in that form. He married Loren some time later, but just before she gave birth to Tobias, the Ellimist repaired Elfangor's "timeline" and returned him to the Andalite homeworld. Elfangor went on to become a great Andalite hero, leading to the events of the first Animorphs book, where Visser Thirty Two, (Esplin 9466 the Greator) having somehow escaped the collapsing universe, has been promoted to Visser Three.

== The Hork-Bajir Chronicles ==
Jara Hamee, the first member of the free Hork-Bajir colony, tells Tobias a story of how the Yeerks tried to enslave the Hork-Bajir, and how Aldrea, an Andalite, tried to help the Hork-Bajir.

== Visser ==
Told from the perspective of the Yeerk Edriss 562 who, during most of the main series, was the designated Visser One. She later takes over the body of Marco's mother, Eva, and fakes her own death to fulfil her duties as the lead Visser. In the book, she is on trial for treason, prosecuted by her enemy, Visser Three. Edriss 562 explains her backstory, from when she was inside her previous host, a Hork-Bajir designated Sub-Visser 409, stationed on the Hork-Bajir world, to when she hijacked a ship and eventually inhabited a female Hollywood actor, Jenny Lines, to her founding of The Sharing inside another host, Lore David Altman, to her current host, Eva, and her role in the Yeerk Empire.

== The Ellimist Chronicles ==
As an unidentified Animorph (who in the final book is revealed to be Rachel) lies on the brink of death, the Ellimist appears and recounts his origins as Azure Level, Seven Spar, Extension Two, Down-Messenger, Forty-One (Toomin) the Ketran and his transfiguration into the Ellimist as a final request to the dying Animorph. The Ketran race was virtually extinguished by the Capasins, who had seen images of violent virtual Ketran games that had been broadcast into space and mistook them for real violence. Toomin/Ellimist was one of the few survivors. These survivors became space nomads, seeking a replacement for their home Ket. Toomin became the leader of this group and was the only survivor when it crash-landed on a mostly aquatic planet. He was kept alive at the bottom of the sea by a planet spanning entity known as Father that accessed every corpse on it. Toomin, after defeating Father at music, began to grow too intelligent for Father and defeated him, incorporating all the memories of corpses on the planet, eventually becoming a blending of minds.

After he defeated Father he began to wander the universe without purpose until he started to resolve conflicts and crises under the name Ellimist. The Ellimist worked like this for several thousand years until he encountered the Crayak, who existed to destroy all life in galaxies, a strong antithesis to what the Ellimist had come to stand for. Crayak engaged Ellimist in games that had entire planets on the stakes. Ellimist did not fare well and lost far more often than he won. Losing motivation to continue fighting the Crayak, the Ellimist temporarily retreated to the Andalite home planet. The Andalites at the time were not the advanced civilization but a primitive collection of tribes. By living on the planet as an Andalite, the Ellimist learned that the key of survival was to create as many offspring as possible; although some may die, with repeated efforts life could multiply faster than the Crayak could wipe them out. With a renewed vigor, the Ellimist fought the Crayak, creating the Pemalites, creators of the Chee, who spread quickly throughout the galaxy (until they were destroyed by Crayak's own creations, the Howlers). Although, the Crayak eventually destroyed the Ellimist physically by luring him into a black hole, the Ellimist found himself fully integrated into the fabric of space-time. Soon, both the Crayak and the Ellimist recognised direct combat to be much too dangerous for themselves and space-time itself. To prevent such catastrophic damage, the Crayak and the Ellimist agree to construct the intricate "game" they are seen to play in the Animorphs series.
