= List of Animorphs books =

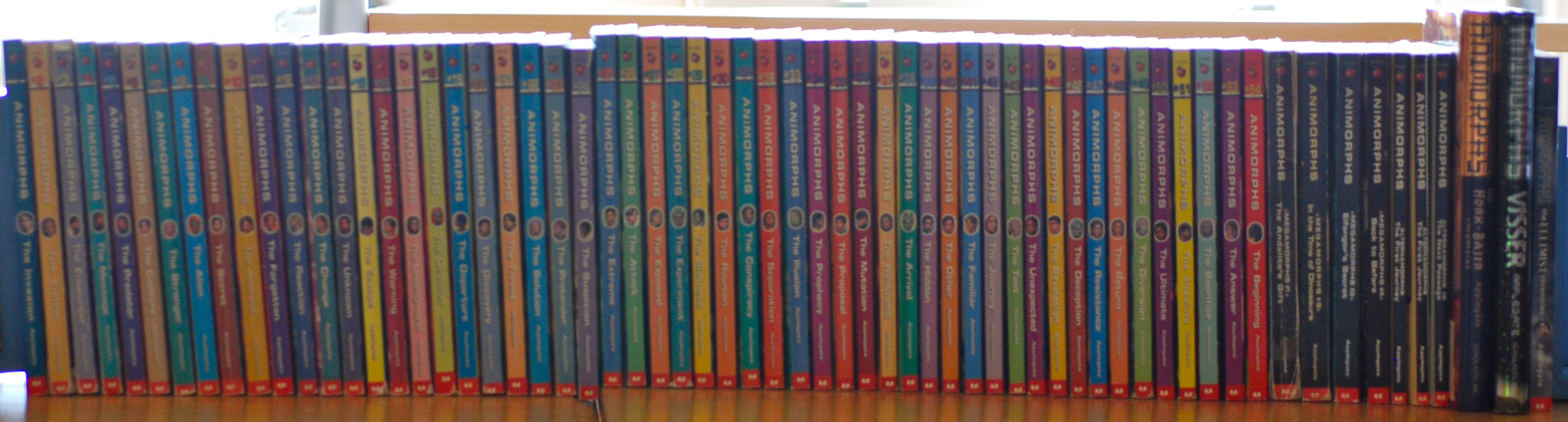
A collection of Animorphs books including selected companion books

This is a list of all books in the Animorphs series by K. A. Applegate. For a list of authors who ghostwrote much of this series using Applegate's name, see Animorphs § Authorship.

== List of main books and companion books in publication order ==
There are fifty-four books in the main series. There is a difference between publication order and chronological order.

Publication date	Number	Title	Cover morph	Narrator	Time period	Ghostwriter	ISBN
June 1996	01	The Invasion	Anole lizard	Jake	c. Spring 1997		0-590-62977-8
June 1996	02	The Visitor	Cat (Fluffer McKitty)	Rachel			0-590-62978-6
August 1996	03	The Encounter	Red-tailed hawk	Tobias			0-590-62979-4
October 1996	04	The Message	Bottlenose dolphin (Monica)	Cassie			0-590-62980-8
December 1996	05	The Predator	Gorilla (Big Jim)	Marco			0-590-62981-6
February 1997	06	The Capture	Housefly	Jake			0-590-62982-4
April 1997	07	The Stranger	Grizzly bear	Rachel			0-590-99726-2
May 1997	Megamorphs #1	The Andalite's Gift	Siberian tiger, housefly, wolf, grizzly bear, and red-tailed hawk	All six Animorphs	c. Summer 1997		0-590-21304-0
July 1997	08	The Alien	Human (blends DNA of Cassie, Jake, Marco, and Rachel)	Aximili-Esgarrouth-Isthill	During or after December 1998		0-590-99728-9
August 1997	09	The Secret	Wolf	Cassie			0-590-99729-7
August 1997	10	The Android	Wolf spider	Marco			0-590-99730-0
September 1997	11	The Forgotten	Jaguar	Jake			0-590-99732-7
October 1997	12	The Reaction	Crocodile	Rachel			0-590-99734-3
November 1997	13	The Change	Human (past self)	Tobias			0-590-49418-X
December 1997		The Andalite Chronicles. This book has three parts. Each part was originally released as a separate book to school book clubs. 1. Elfangor's Journey. 2. Alloran's Choice. 3. An Alien Dies.		Elfangor-Sirinial-Shamtul	c. 1976, the 1980s, and c. Spring 1997		ISBN 0-590-10971-5
January 1998	14	The Unknown	Horse (Minneapolis Max)	Cassie			0-590-49423-6
January 1998	15	The Escape	Hammerhead shark	Marco			0-590-49424-4
March 1998	16	The Warning	Rhinoceros	Jake			0-590-49430-9
April 1998	17	The Underground	Bat	Rachel			0-590-49436-8
May 1998	18	The Decision	Mosquito	Aximili-Esgarrouth-Isthill			0-590-49441-4
June 1998	Megamorphs #2	In the Time of Dinosaurs		All six Animorphs	Sario Rip time travel to 65,000,000 years ago		ISBN 0-590-95615-9
July 1998	19	The Departure	Black swallowtail butterfly	Cassie and Jake			0-590-49451-1
August 1998	20	The Discovery	King cobra snake	Marco			0-590-49637-9
September 1998	21	The Threat	Golden retriever dog (Homer)	Jake			0-590-76254-0
October 1998	22	The Solution	White rat	Rachel			0-590-76255-9
November 1998		The Hork-Bajir Chronicles		Tobias, Aldrea-Iskillion-Falan, Dak Hamee, and Esplin 9466	1966, 1968-69, and 1998 In the year 1998, Jara Hamee tells Tobias about the Yeerk invasion of the Hork-Bajir home world. The events described happened in the 1960s.		ISBN 0-439-04291-7
November 1998	23	The Pretender	Rabbit	Tobias	Presumably 1998		0-590-76256-7
December 1998	24	The Suspicion	Giant anteater	Cassie			0-590-76257-5
January 1999	25	The Extreme	Polar bear	Marco		Jeffrey Zeuhlke	0-590-76258-3
February 1999	26	The Attack	Siberian tiger	Jake			0-590-76259-1
March 1999	27	The Exposed	Giant squid	Rachel		Laura Battyanyi-Weiss	0-590-76260-5
April 1999	28	The Experiment	Cattle	Aximili-Esgarrouth-Isthill		Amy Garvey	0-590-76261-3
April 1999	Alternamorphs #1	The First Journey		Second person	It is a gamebook, similar to the Choose Your Own Adventure series. The story exists outside continuity.	Unknown	ISBN 0-439-06164-4
May 1999	29	The Sickness	Yeerk (Illim)	Cassie		Melinda Metz	0-590-76262-1
May 1999	Megamorphs #3	Elfangor's Secret		All six Animorphs	Time Matrix time travel to October 25, 1415, December 25, 1776, October 21, 1805, 1934, June 6, 1944, and 1967.		ISBN 0-590-03639-4
June 1999	30	The Reunion	Cockroach	Marco		Elise Donner	0-590-76263-X
July 1999	31	The Conspiracy	Peregrine falcon	Jake		Laura Battyanyi-Weiss	0-439-07031-7
August 1999	32	The Separation	Starfish	Rachel			0-439-07032-5
September 1999	33	The Illusion	Andalite (Aximili-Esgarrouth-Isthill)	Tobias		Ellen Geroux	0-439-07033-3
October 1999	34	The Prophecy	Hork-Bajir (Jara Hamee)	Cassie and Aldrea-Iskillion-Falan	During or after May 1999	Melinda Metz	0-439-07034-1
November 1999	35	The Proposal	Poodle dog (Euclid)	Marco		Jeffrey Zeuhlke	0-439-07035-X
November 1999		Visser		Edriss 562	1976, the 1980s, and 1991-99		ISBN 0-439-08764-3
December 1999	36	The Mutation	Orca (Swoosh)	Jake		Erica Bobone	0-439-10675-3
January 2000	37	The Weakness	Cheetah	Rachel		Elise Smith	0-439-10676-1
February 2000	38	The Arrival	Northern harrier	Aximili-Esgarrouth-Isthill		Kimberly Morris	0-439-10677-X
March 2000	39	The Hidden	African Cape buffalo	Cassie		Laura Battyanyi-Weiss	0-439-10678-8
April 2000	40	The Other	Honey bee	Marco		Gina Gascone	0-439-10679-6
March 2000	Alternamorphs #2	The Next Passage		Second person	It is a gamebook, similar to the Choose Your Own Adventure series. The story exists outside continuity.	Emily Costello	ISBN 0-439-14263-6
April 2000	41	The Familiar	Human (future self) (not technically a morph)	Jake		Ellen Geroux	0-439-11515-9
May 2000	Megamorphs #4	Back to Before		All six Animorphs	1990 and alternate time line of 1997		ISBN 0-439-17307-8
June 2000	42	The Journey	African elephant	Rachel and Marco		Emily Costello	0-439-11516-7
July 2000	43	The Test	Taxxon	Tobias		Ellen Geroux	0-439-11517-5
August 2000	44	The Unexpected	Kangaroo	Cassie	January 2000	Lisa Harkrader	0-439-11518-3
September 2000	45	The Revelation	Black garden ant	Marco		Ellen Geroux	0-439-11519-1
October 2000	46	The Deception	Human (Joseph Felitti)	Aximili-Esgarrouth-Isthill		Elise Donner	0-439-11520-5
November 2000	47	The Resistance	North American beaver	Jake and Isaiah		Ellen Geroux	0-439-11521-3
November 2000		The Ellimist Chronicles		Ellimist / Toomin	The events described happened billions of years in the past. However, they are being described in the year 2000.		ISBN 0-439-21798-9
December 2000	48	The Return	Super-Rachel (not technically a morph)	Rachel		Kimberly Morris	0-439-11522-1
January 2001	49	The Diversion	German shepherd dog (Champ)	Tobias		Lisa Harkrader	0-439-11523-X
February 2001	50	The Ultimate	Great horned owl	Cassie		Kimberly Morris	0-439-11524-8
March 2001	51	The Absolute	Mallard duck	Marco		Lisa Harkrader	0-439-11525-6
April 2001	52	The Sacrifice	Raccoon	Aximili-Esgarrouth-Isthill		Kimberly Morris	0-439-11526-4
May 2001	53	The Answer	Anaconda	Jake			0-439-11527-2
May 2001	54	The Beginning	The heads of all six Animorphs are shown, from the side, mimicking the Rolling Stones compilation album Hot Rocks 1964–1971	All six Animorphs	2000, 2001, 2003, and maybe early 2004		0-439-11528-0

== Chronological list ==
This is a chronological list of the Animorphs books by K. A. Applegate, as applies to storyline continuity.

- The Andalite Chronicles (c. 1976, 1980s, 1997)
  - This book is divided into three parts: #1: Elfangor's Journey, #2: Alloran's Choice, and #3: An Alien Dies.
- 1: The Invasion (Spring 1997)
- 2: The Visitor
- 3: The Encounter
- 4: The Message
- 5: The Predator
- 6: The Capture
- 7: The Stranger
- Megamorphs 1: The Andalite's Gift (Summer 1997)
- 8: The Alien
- 9: The Secret
- 10: The Android
- 11: The Forgotten
- 12: The Reaction
- 13: The Change
- 14: The Unknown
- 15: The Escape
- 16: The Warning
- 17: The Underground
- 18: The Decision—(c. 1998)
- Megamorphs 2: In the Time of Dinosaurs—(Sario Rip time travel to 65,000,000 years ago.)
- 19: The Departure
- The Hork-Bajir Chronicles (1966, 1968–69, 1998)
  - Although the events in this story occur between The Ellimist Chronicles and The Andalite Chronicles, the entire story is being told by Jara Hamee to Tobias after book #13, The Change, and before the events of #23 The Pretender. Tobias makes reference to his restlessness and the fact that there were no missions planned (Prologue, pg ix). However, in The Pretender, (pg 12) Tobias makes reference to the fact that they had "worked plenty lately, dealing with the horrifying matter of David, the first new Animorph." This places the last possible "break" before book #20, the first book in the David trilogy
- 20: The Discovery
- 21: The Threat
- 22: The Solution
- 23: The Pretender
- 24: The Suspicion
- 25: The Extreme
- 26: The Attack
- 27: The Exposed
- 28: The Experiment
- 29: The Sickness
- Megamorphs 3: Elfangor's Secret (Time Matrix time travel to 10/25/1415, 12/25/1776, 10/21/1805, 1934, 6/6/1944, and 1967)
- 30: The Reunion—(sometime a little bit before or after 12/18/98)
- 31: The Conspiracy
- 32: The Separation—(c. 1999)
- 33: The Illusion
- 34: The Prophecy
- 35: The Proposal
- Visser (1976, 1980s, 1991–1999)
  - The trial chronicled in Visser is set during and after the events of The Proposal, but the book also covers events before The Andalite Chronicles.
- 36: The Mutation
- 37: The Weakness
- 38: The Arrival
- 39: The Hidden
- 40: The Other
- Megamorphs 4: Back to Before (1999, experimental timeline to 1997)
- 41: The Familiar
- 42: The Journey
- 43: The Test
- 44: The Unexpected (c. 2000)
- 45: The Revelation
- 46: The Deception
- 47: The Resistance
- 48: The Return
- 49: The Diversion
- 50: The Ultimate
- 51: The Absolute
- 52: The Sacrifice
- 53: The Answer
- The Ellimist Chronicles (story stretching billions of years into the past)
  - Technically this is set during the same time as the first chapters of The Beginning even though it covers events set far before The Andalite Chronicles.
- 54: The Beginning (2000-c. 2004)

== Graphic novels ==
A series of graphic novel adaptations, adapted by and with art by Chris Grine, began to be released in October 2020. Each volume adapts one book from the original series.

Number	Title	Publication date	Cover morph	Narrator	ISBN
01	The Invasion	October 2020	Anole lizard	Jake	ISBN 978-133-8226-485 (Hardcover); ISBN 978-133-8538-090 (Paperback)
02	The Visitor	October 2021	Cat (Fluffer McKitty)	Rachel	ISBN 978-133-8538-397 (Hardcover); ISBN 978-133-8538-373 (Paperback)
03	The Encounter	October 2022	Red-tailed hawk	Tobias	ISBN 978-133-8538-410 (Hardcover); ISBN 978-133-8538-403 (Paperback)
04	The Message	December 2023	Bottlenose dolphin (Monica)	Cassie	ISBN 978-133-8796-216 (Hardcover); ISBN 978-133-8796-209 (Paperback)
05	The Predator	August 2024	Gorilla (Big Jim)	Marco	ISBN 978-133-8796-247 (Hardcover); ISBN 978-133-8796-230 (Paperback)
06	The Capture	March 2025	Housefly	Jake	ISBN 978-133-8796-278 (Hardcover); ISBN 978-133-8796-261 (Paperback)
