= Romas Kukalis =

Canadian-American painter

Romas Brandt Kukalis (also known simply as Romas; born in Toronto, Ontario) is a Canadian-American painter best known for his work as a cover artist for books of speculative fiction, including the Animorphs Chronicles. Kukalis also illustrated eight cards for the Magic: The Gathering collectible card game. Three were created under the name Romas Kukalis and five were created using only Romas for the Portal set.

== Personal life ==
Kukalis was raised in Connecticut, and trained at Paier College of Art (from which he was graduated in 1978) in Hamden, Connecticut. He now lives in Keene, New Hampshire. He is married to Allison Barrows, a cartoonist, author, and advertising illustrator. They have a daughter and a son.
