= Animorphs (GBC video game) =

2000 video game

- Developer: Runny-Fun
- Publisher: Ubi Soft
- Producer: Tony Gold
- Designers: Christopher Locke; Grady Sain
- Programmer: Christopher Locke
- Artists: Grady Sain; Dirk Tiede
- Composer: Randy Wilson
- Platform: Game Boy Color
- Release: NA: November 7, 2000; PAL: December 15, 2000
- Genres: Adventure, role-playing
- Mode: Single-player

Animorphs is a 2000 game for the Game Boy Color. It is based upon the Scholastic book series Animorphs by K. A. Applegate.

== Gameplay ==
A pre-release screenshot of one of the Animorphs in coyote morph preparing to fight a Hork-Bajir.

The game operates in a series of turn-based battles during combat. In a manner similar to the Pokémon video games, the object of Animorphs is to fight and defeat various animals and aliens in order to gain the morph (DNA) of that creature. Sometimes, the player can use the animal's acquired skills outside combat. For example, snakes crawl up walls, fish swim, and bird morphs take to the air. The game saves using a password system.

Animorphs was supposed to use the "Ubi Key" feature, allowing players to share data between games via the system's infrared port and unlock extra content, but ultimately the game shipped without the feature.

== Development ==
The game was developed by American studio RUNANDGUN! under the pseudonym Runny-Fun and published by Ubi Soft.

== Reception ==
Critical reception of the game was generally negative. Marc Nix of IGN described the game as "pat and boring, but also silly in difficulty at times since there's little guiding your path and no real clue to the strategy." He gave it a score of 3.0 out of 10. Nintendo Power was a bit more favorable in its review of the game, giving it 3 out of 5.
