= Erica Ferencik =

American novelist

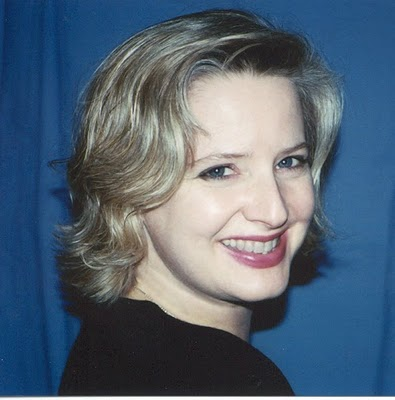
- Born: October 21, 1958 (age 67); Urbana, Illinois, U.S.
- Education: University of Massachusetts (BA); Boston University (MA)
- Writing career
- Notable work: Repeaters
- Website: ericaferencik.com

Erica Ferencik (born October 21, 1958) is a Massachusetts-based novelist, screenwriter and stand-up comic.

== Early life ==
Ferencik was born in Urbana, Illinois and later obtained a Bachelor of Arts degree in painting and French from University of Massachusetts and after a Master of Arts in creative writing from Boston University.

Ferencik did stand-up comedy for ten years at various comedy clubs in Boston and New York and was also a material writer for David Letterman during the early years of his national late-night show.

== Writing career ==
In 2022, Ferencik released the novel "Girl in Ice", a psychological suspense thriller about a linguist who travels to an island off the northwest coast of Greenland in the attempt to communicate with a young girl found frozen in the ice.

== Works ==
- Ghostwrote "The Mutation", a novel in the Animorphs series by K. A. Applegate
- Novella "The Inheritance" a finalist in the 2005 Malahat Review Novella Competition
- Wrote and made the prizewinning short film "New Stepmom"
- Frequent writer/performer for National Public Radio's "Morning Edition"

== Bibliography ==
=== Novels ===
- "Girl in Ice", Gallery/Scout Press - 2022
- "Into the Jungle", Gallery/Scout Press - 2019
- "The River at Night" - 2017
- "Repeaters", Waking Dream Press - 2011
- Cracks in the Foundation, Waking Dream Press - 2008

=== Screenplays ===
- Thriller screenplay, "Mob Dot Com", co-written with Rick D'Elia, optioned by Goodman Productions

=== Nonfiction ===
- Radio My Way, Pearson Education - 2011

=== Awards ===
- Repeaters was awarded a starred Kirkus Review and named to Kirkus Reviews Best of 2012
