= Susan E. Brown =

American medical anthropologist and nutritionist

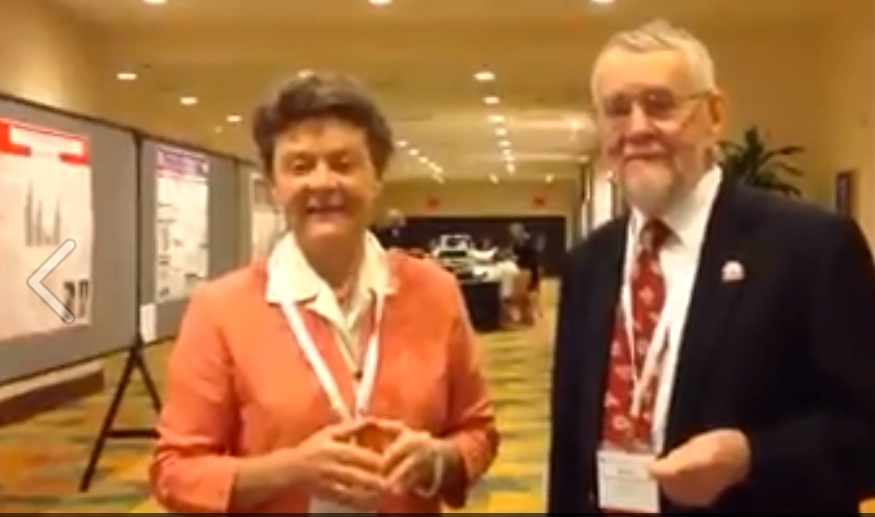
Susan E. Brown with Robert Heaney, 2014

Susan E. Brown is an American medical anthropologist and certified nutritionist, and two-time Fulbright scholar, who uses holistic and non-pharmacological interventions in the treatment of osteoporosis. She is the author of several books on the topic of natural bone health, including Better Bones, Better Body: Beyond Estrogen and Calcium (McGraw Hill 2000).
