= Sue Ellen Brown =

American artist

- Born: May 8, 1954; Tyler, Texas
- Education: University of North Texas
- Movement: Sketch Pad Studio
- Spouse: Don Stewart
- Website: zoolnart.com

Sue Ellen Brown (born March 8, 1954) is an artist living in Birmingham, Alabama.

== Early life ==
Brown was born in Tyler, Texas to John Robert and Joy Kathryn (née Hardie). Brown spent much of her childhood drawing and painting. During this period, she encountered the work artists and writers who would become inspirations for her own work, including George MacDonald and Hans Christian Andersen. J. R. R. Tolkien and C. S. Lewis later became important to Brown due to their vivid and layered styles.

== Career ==
After graduating with a B.F.A. in Advertising Design from University of North Texas in 1977, Brown assisted Don Ivan Punchatz at the Sketch Pad Studio in Dallas, Texas, then became a staff artist for Hallmark Cards. Since 1986 she has worked independently a painter, portrait artist and illustrator.

Regarding Brown's Shell Series of oil paintings on canvas, The Birmingham News described her as a lyrical nonobjective abstractionist. She contributed to the exhibit "Heads Up Alabama" at the Aldridge Botanical Gardens in Hoover in 2010, with her work "Mental Block".

Brown has illustrated children's books for various publishers, worked for commercial clients such as McDonald's, Denny's, and Pepsi, and produced cover art for books and magazines. She has earned two Paragon Awards from the National Council for Marketing and Public Relations, and she was included in the New York City Society of Illustrators' Humor Exhibition, and The Encyclopedia of Fantasy and Science Fiction Art Techniques.

Books Illustrated by Sue Ellen Brown:

- Time-Life Family Time Bible Stories: The First Christmas by Patricia Daniels. ISBN 0-7835-4625-4
- Gleaming Bright by Josepha Sherman. Walker & Co. New York 1994 ISBN 0-8027-8296-5
- Orphans of the Night Josepha Sherman, ed. Walker & Co. New York 1995 ISBN 0-8027-8368-6
- The Nativity: A Bible Story Pop-Up Book by Thomas Nelson (publisher) 1993 ISBN 0-8407-8481-3
- Winter's Child by Mary K. Whittington. Atheneum New York 1992 ISBN 0-689-31685-2

She has also illustrated cards for the Magic: The Gathering collectible card game.

== Personal life ==
Brown is now married to artist Don Stewart, with whom she shares studio space.
