= Xi Zhang (artist) =

- Born: 1984 (age 41–42); Kaifeng, Henan, China
- Known for: painting, Contemporary art
- Awards: The 12 best Colorado artists under age 35, The Pathmakers: Visual Art, Grand Prize in Painting from See Me
- Website: www.xizhang.org

Xi Zhang (Chinese: 张曦; born 1984 in Kaifeng, China) is a contemporary artist who lives and works in China and the United States.

== Biography ==
Zhang moved to the United States in 2004 after studying painting at the Beijing Institute of Art and Design. He then studied at the Rocky Mountain College of Art and Design in Denver and received a Bachelor of Fine Arts in painting in 2008. That same year, the Denver Post selected Zhang as the 2008 Emerging Artist of the Year for his “well developed, surprising mature vision.” In 2011, Zhang was commissioned by CNN to do a painting about post 9/11. On October 26, 2011, Zhang was invited to give a Logan Lecture at Denver Art Museum. He earned a Masters of Fine Art in painting at the University of Colorado at Boulder in 2011. That same year he was voted one of the 12 Best Colorado Artists Under 35 by the Denver Post, as well as one of the seven Visual Arts Pathfinders. In 2012, Zhang has been selected to represent the United States in the Biennial of the Americas. On July 18, 2013, a short documentary of Zhang was featured on PBS and KUNC for the Art Distract Program.

== Awards ==
- Grand Prize in Painting from See Me
- The 12 best Colorado artists under age 35
- Top Ten Colorado Art Happenings of 2011
- The Pathmakers: Visual Art
- 2008 Emerging Artist of the Year

== Selected solo exhibitions ==
- 2018 "Xi Zhang" Marc Straus Gallery
- 2013 "21st Xi Zhang: 21st Century DNA" McNichols
- 2012 "11 Ceremonies" Plus gallery
- 2010 "the promise" Denver International Airport
- 2010 "Dream Dusts" HeNan Art Museum, China
- 2008 "12921" Rule Gallery
- 2006 "Never Land" (peace project) Museum of Contemporary Art Denver
