= All the Mowgli Stories =

Collection of short stories by Rudyard Kipling

- First US edition (1936)
- Author: Rudyard Kipling
- Illustrator: Stuart Tresilian
- Cover artist: Kurt Wiese
- Genre: Short story collection
- Publisher: Macmillan and Co.
- Publication date: 1933

All the Mowgli Stories is a collection of short stories by Rudyard Kipling. As the title suggests, the book is a chronological compilation of the stories about Mowgli from The Jungle Book and The Second Jungle Book, together with "In the Rukh" (the first Mowgli story written, although the last in chronological order). The book also includes the epigrammatic poems added to the stories for their original book publication. All of the stories and poems had originally been published between 1893 and 1895.

The book was first published under this title in 1933 by Macmillan and Co., containing colour plates and pen illustrations by Stuart Tresilian. Its contents are virtually identical to The Works of Rudyard Kipling Volume VII: The Jungle Book, part of a multi-volume set which had appeared in 1907. (A companion volume, The Works of Rudyard Kipling Volume VIII: The Jungle Book collects all of the non-Mowgli stories from the two Jungle Books.)

== Contents ==
=== Short stories ===
1. Mowgli's Brothers
2. Kaa's Hunting
3. How Fear Came - During a drought, Mowgli and the animals gather at a shrunken Wainganga River for a Water Truce where the display of the blue-coloured Peace Rock prevents anyone from hunting at its riverbanks. After Shere Khan was driven away by him for nearly defiling the Peace Rock, Hathi the elephant tells Mowgli the story of how the first tiger got his stripes when fear first came to the jungle.
4. Tiger! Tiger!
5. Letting in the Jungle
6. The King's Ankus - Mowgli discovers a jewelled object beneath the Cold Lairs that he later discards carelessly, not realising that men will kill each other to possess it. Mowgli later returns the treasure to its hiding-place to prevent further killings.
7. Red Dog
8. The Spring Running - Mowgli, now almost 17 years old, is growing restless for reasons he cannot understand. On an aimless run through the jungle he stumbles across the village where his adopted mother Messua is now living with her 2-year-old son, and is torn between staying with her and returning to the jungle.
9. In the Rukh

=== Poems ===
1. Hunting-Song of the Seeonee Pack
2. Road-Song of the Bandar-Log (poem)
3. The Law of the Jungle (poem)
4. Mowgli's Song (that he sang at the Council Rock when he danced on Shere Khan's hide)
5. Mowgli's Song Against People (poem)
6. The Out-Song (poem)
