= Letting in the Jungle =

1894 short story by Rudyard Kipling

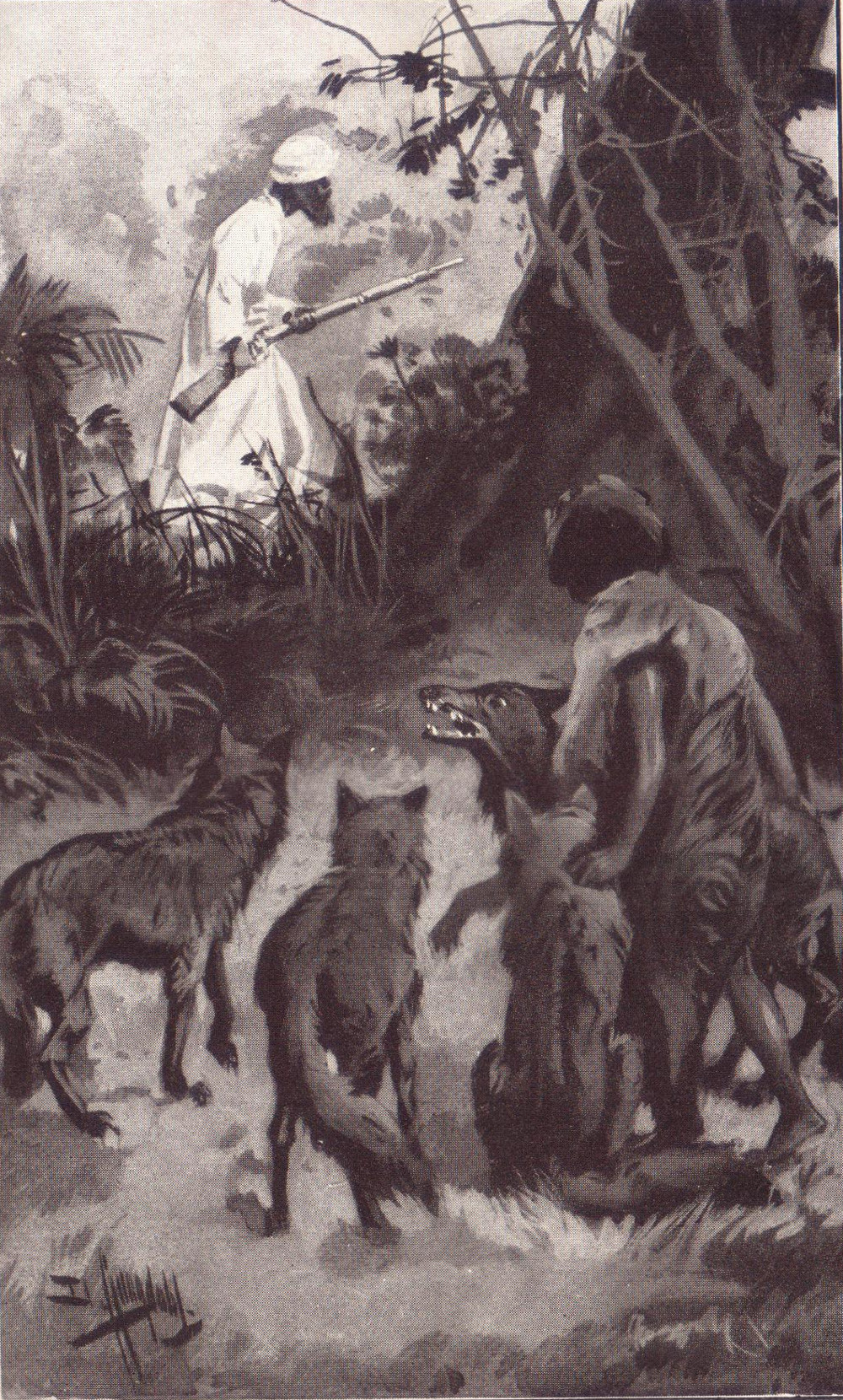
Illustration from "Letting in the Jungle" in Rudyard Kipling's The Second Jungle Book.

"Letting In the Jungle" is a short story by Rudyard Kipling which continues Mowgli's adventures from "Mowgli's Brothers" and "Tiger! Tiger!". The story was written at Kipling's parents' home in Tisbury, Wiltshire, and is therefore the only Mowgli story not written in Vermont.

It was published in the Pall Mall Gazette and the Pall Mall Budget for December 13, 1894, and in McClure's Magazine for January 1895, before being collected as the third story in The Second Jungle Book (1895).

== Story ==
In the previous story Mowgli fulfilled his vow to kill the tiger Shere Khan and to lay his hide upon the wolfpack's Council Rock, but was cast out of the human village after its chief hunter Buldeo learned of his friendship with wolves and accused him of sorcery.

Mowgli returns to the jungle and tries to forget humanity, but Akela tells him that Buldeo is still searching for him. Grey Brother suggests killing Buldeo, but Mowgli angrily forbids him.

Mowgli and the wolves stalk Buldeo and eavesdrop on his conversation with some charcoal-burners. Mowgli is shocked to discover that the villagers have imprisoned his adoptive human parents, Messua and her husband, and are planning to execute them for fostering Mowgli.

Ordering the wolves to harry Buldeo and prevent him from returning to the village, Mowgli returns there to rescue his parents. He discovers that his adopted wolf mother Raksha has also arrived, and warns her to keep out of sight while he frees Messua and her husband.

Meshua is pleased that her son has returned to save them, but her husband is bitter at losing most of his money and possessions and shows no paternal warmth toward Mowgli.

Messua and her husband set out on foot for the town of Khanhiwara, some thirty miles away, guarded by Raksha at a discreet distance. Meanwhile, Bagheera the panther arrives and takes their place in the hut, so that when the villagers arrive to take out the prisoners they get an unpleasant surprise.

The next day Mowgli tells Bagheera he has a plan to take back the jungle and banish the villagers, a plan that involves Hathi the elephant leader and his sons. Bagheera is skeptical that Hathi will answer Mowgli's summons, but is surprised when he does so.

Mowgli tells Hathi of a story Buldeo once told, about an elephant that escaped from a trap and took revenge upon his captors by trampling their fields and villages. Hathi confirms Mowgli's suspicion that he was the elephant in the story. Mowgli wants Hathi to destroy Buldeo's village as well, but to take more time doing so.

Over the course of several weeks the village fields are invaded by herds of wild pigs, deer and buffalo, the livestock is harried by wolves, and the elephants destroy the grain storage bins. While all this is happening Mowgli keeps well out of sight so that the villagers will not suspect his involvement. Finally, as the rainy season sets in, the elephants tear down the village huts and any villagers who have not already left flee for their lives. Six months afterward the wreckage has been completely swallowed by wild jungle and Mowgli's plan is complete.

== In other media ==
- In the 1942 film, Mowgli recruits Hathi and his herd to help with banishing the humans for their crimes, but it leads to rescuing animals when a fire threatens the jungle.
- In the anime series Jungle Book Shōnen Mowgli, one episode shows Mowgli, Hathi, Baloo, Bagheera, and Raksha leading an army of elephants, buffaloes, deer, wild boars, and wolves to protect the jungle from Buldeo's dark deeds.
