= Hathi =

Jungle Book character

- The Jungle Book character
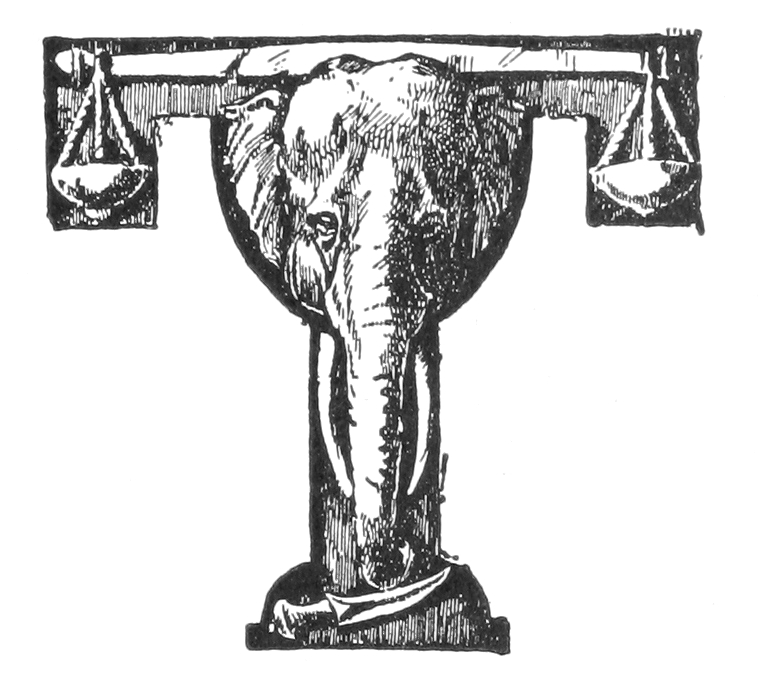
- Hathi as illustrated by W. H. Drake in the 1895 edition of The Two Jungle Books
- First appearance: "Kaa's Hunting"
- Last appearance: "Letting in the Jungle"
- Created by: Rudyard Kipling

In-universe information
- Nickname: Colonel Hathi
- Species: Indian elephant
- Gender: Male
- Occupation: Colonel
- Children: 3

Hathi is a fictional character created by Rudyard Kipling for the Mowgli stories collected in The Jungle Book (1894) and The Second Jungle Book (1895). Hathi is an elephant that lives in the Seeoni jungle. Kipling named him after hāthī (हाथी), the Hindi word for "elephant".

== Kipling's character ==
Hathi is head of the elephant troop. He is one of the oldest animals of the jungle and represents order, dignity and obedience to the Law of the Jungle. Hathi is famed for his patience and never hurries unnecessarily.

In "How Fear Came" at the time when the water truce occurred, he tells Mowgli and the jungle animals' creation myth and describes Tha, the first of elephants and how the first tiger broke the first law by slaying a man thus condemning the animals to being prey for humankind. He told this after Shere Khan the tiger had boasted about killing a man purely for sport and following him drinking some water where some dark oily streaks floated on the water. Hathi and his sons made sure that Shere Khan had his fill and sent him away to make sure he doesn't defile the river any further.

In the story "Letting In the Jungle", Mowgli reveals that Hathi once destroyed a human village in revenge for being captured and persuades Hathi and his sons to do the same to the village where Mowgli once lived as punishment for threatening Messua with execution.

== Disney adaptations ==
Hathi appears in the 1967 animated adaptation by Walt Disney Productions, where he is voiced by J. Pat O'Malley. He is a comically pompous elephant who styles himself after a British Army colonel, referring to himself as "Colonel Hathi" and leading his troop in a marching patrol around the jungle. He is seen as obnoxious by the other animals including his own herd and is forgetful, though he insists that "an elephant never forgets". His marching awakens Mowgli, who attempts to join, though Hathi becomes angry when he notices Mowgli is a human, wanting "no mancub in my jungle". Bagheera takes Mowgli away and Hathi continues marching before he notices he has left Hathi Junior behind. He goes back to get him but forgets to order his troop to halt, causing the herd to crash into him much to Mowgli's amusement. Bagheera later asks him to help him find Mowgli after he runs away from Baloo, reminding him that Shere Khan has returned to the jungle. Hathi agrees after Winifred and Hathi Junior convince him and orders the troop to begin searching. Unbeknownst to them, Shere Khan decides to start looking for Mowgli by himself, having heard them from only yards away.

Hathi returns in the Disney sequel The Jungle Book 2, voiced by Jim Cummings. He and his troop help Bagheera prevent Baloo from entering the human village where Mowgli is living, though Baloo evades them. Hathi tries to chase Baloo across the bridge leading to the village, but it breaks under his weight causing him and Bagheera to fall into the river below. Hathi is later seen fleeing from villagers searching for Mowgli and his friends. After being told by Hathi that man is in the jungle, Bagheera deduces from him that Baloo has something to do with the children going missing.

Hathi appears as a calf in the prequel series Jungle Cubs, where he is voiced by Rob Paulsen in season one and Stephen Furst in season two. Hathi is friendly with the other cubs, though he is usually seen trying to court his future mate Winifred. Winifred lives with her herd under the ownership of humans until a storm separates her from her herd, causing her to meet Hathi.

Hathi appears in The Jungle Book: Mowgli's Story, voiced by Marty Ingels.

A pizza restaurant in Disneyland Paris is named Colonel Hathi's Pizza Outpost.

== Other media ==
- Hathi is a supporting character in the 1942 film of The Jungle Book. He warns Mowgli of Shere Khan's return during their final fight. He also helps Mowgli rescue Messua and the jungle creatures from a wild fire.
- Hathi is a major character in the anime series Jungle Book Shōnen Mowgli where he is the king and enforcer of the Law of the Jungle. Like in the stories, he has 3 children, and is one animal Shere Khan fears. Hathi tells Mowgli about the story for Thaa and how Shere Khan's ancestor broke the Law by slaying a man, and also helps him chase away Buldeo for his crimes. In the series, Chil the kite is his messenger. He is voiced by Daisuke Gouri in the Japanese version.
- Hathi appears briefly in the beginning of Jetlag Productions film The Jungle Book alongside his wife and his son, but they have non-speaking appearance in the scene.
- Hathi is a major character in the 2010 TV series. Here, he has 2 children named Appu and Heetah and a wife named Kachini. Like the 1989 TV series, he is one animal Shere Khan fears.
- Hathi (not referred by name) appears in Mowgli: Legend of the Jungle. He lost half his right tusk to John Lockwood, a colonial hunter. He frees Mowgli from a deep trap, and also helps him defeat Shere Khan. He kills Lockwood to stop him from causing more harm.
