= Chil =

Chil may refer to:

- A character in The Jungle Book; see List of The Jungle Book characters#Mowgli's adventures
- Chil, Iran, a village in Sistan and Baluchestan Province, Iran
- Chil, Hormozgan, a village in Hormozgan Province, Iran
- Kim Chil (1422–1478), scholar-official of the early Joseon Dynasty in Korea
