= Jaghdar =

Jaghdar (Persian: جغدر) may refer to:

- Jaghdar-e Bala
- Jaghdar-e Pain
