= Tiger! Tiger! (Kipling short story) =

1893 short story by Rudyard Kipling

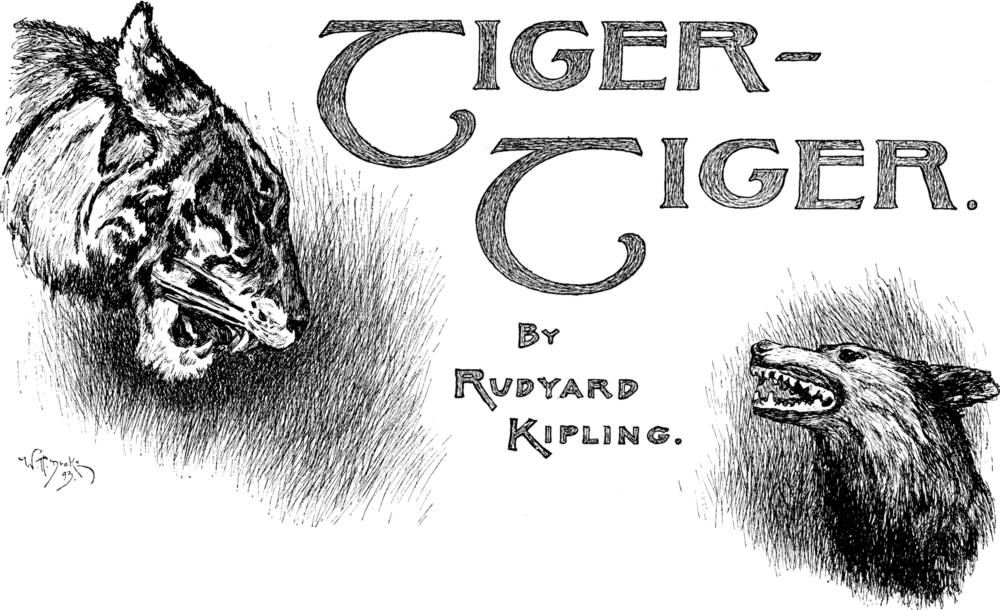
"Tiger! Tiger!": logo and illustration by Will H. Drake, St. Nicholas Magazine, Vol. XXI, 1894.

"Tiger! Tiger!" is a short story by Rudyard Kipling. A direct sequel to "Mowgli's Brothers", it was published in magazines in 1893–94 before appearing as the third story in The Jungle Book (1894), following "Kaa's Hunting". The title is derived from William Blake's poem "The Tyger".

The story focuses on Mowgli's alienation from wolf and human society, which both reject him.

== Story ==
After driving out the tiger Shere Khan, (Note: As depicted in Mowgli's Brothers.) Mowgli leaves the wolf pack that has raised him and makes his way to a human village to be with his own (biological) kind. There he is adopted by a bereaved couple, Messua and her husband, due to his resemblance to their long-lost son Nathoo. The village priest agrees to this because it will keep Messua's rich husband happy.

For three months Mowgli learns human language and customs such as wearing clothes, ploughing, money and caste divisions, few of which impress him. He is also disrespectful to the village elders when they tell fanciful tales of the jungle, such as claims of the tiger being the reincarnation of a lame money-lender, since he has first-hand experience of what the jungle is really like. What is not fanciful is the 100-rupee reward for the tiger's skin.

During this period, Mowgli regularly sneaks out of the village to meet his wolf friend Grey Brother who brings him news of the jungle.

To keep Mowgli out of trouble the village elders decide to put him to work herding buffalo. One day while taking a break from this task he meets Grey Brother again. The wolf tells him that Shere Khan has returned and is planning to kill Mowgli.

For the next few weeks Grey Brother keeps watch on Shere Khan while Mowgli goes about his tasks in the village. Eventually he meets Mowgli again and tells him that Shere Khan is hiding in a nearby ravine in preparation to attack. Mowgli learns that Grey Brother obtained this information from Shere Khan's accomplice Tabaqui the jackal, before killing him.

With the aid of Akela, Mowgli and Grey Brother divide the buffalo herd in two and stampede them from opposite ends of the ravine, trampling the tiger to death between them.

Mowgli, who has promised to lay Shere Khan's skin on the wolf pack's Council Rock, sets about skinning the tiger. The village hunter Buldeo has been told of the stampede by the other village boys, and soon arrives to chastise Mowgli. Buldeo demands that Mowgli hand the skin over to him for the reward. Mowgli refuses, and summons Akela to restrain him.

When Mowgli and Akela let him go, the frightened hunter returns to the village and tells the villagers Mowgli is a shapeshifting sorcerer. By the time the unsuspecting Mowgli returns with the buffalo, the entire village except Messua has turned against him and they drive him away.

Confused and disgusted by their behaviour, Mowgli fulfils his promise to lay out Shere Khan's hide on Council Rock and dances upon it, singing of his emotional confusion. The pack offers to take Mowgli back, but he refuses to forgive them for casting him out earlier. Instead he decides that from now on he will hunt alone, except for his four wolf-brothers who refuse to be parted from him. The story ends with the statement that Mowgli will eventually grow up and get married, "but that is a story for grown-ups". This is clearly a reference to Kipling's earlier story "In the Rukh" (collected in Many Inventions), which was indeed aimed at adults, in which the adult Mowgli does marry.
