= Kaa's Hunting =

Short story by Rudyard Kipling

"Kaa's Hunting" is an 1893 short story by Rudyard Kipling featuring Mowgli. Chronologically the story falls between the first and second halves of "Mowgli's Brothers", and is the second story in The Jungle Book (1894) where it is accompanied by the poem "Road Song of the Bandar-log".

== Story ==
The seven-year-old "man-cub" Mowgli, raised by wolves in the Indian jungle, is being tutored in the Law of the Jungle by Baloo the bear, but "runs off in a temper" when Baloo hits him over the head for inattention. Bagheera the black panther, who disapproves of this corporal punishment, persuades Mowgli to return and recite his lessons. These include the "Master Words" for various species that identify the speaker as a friend.

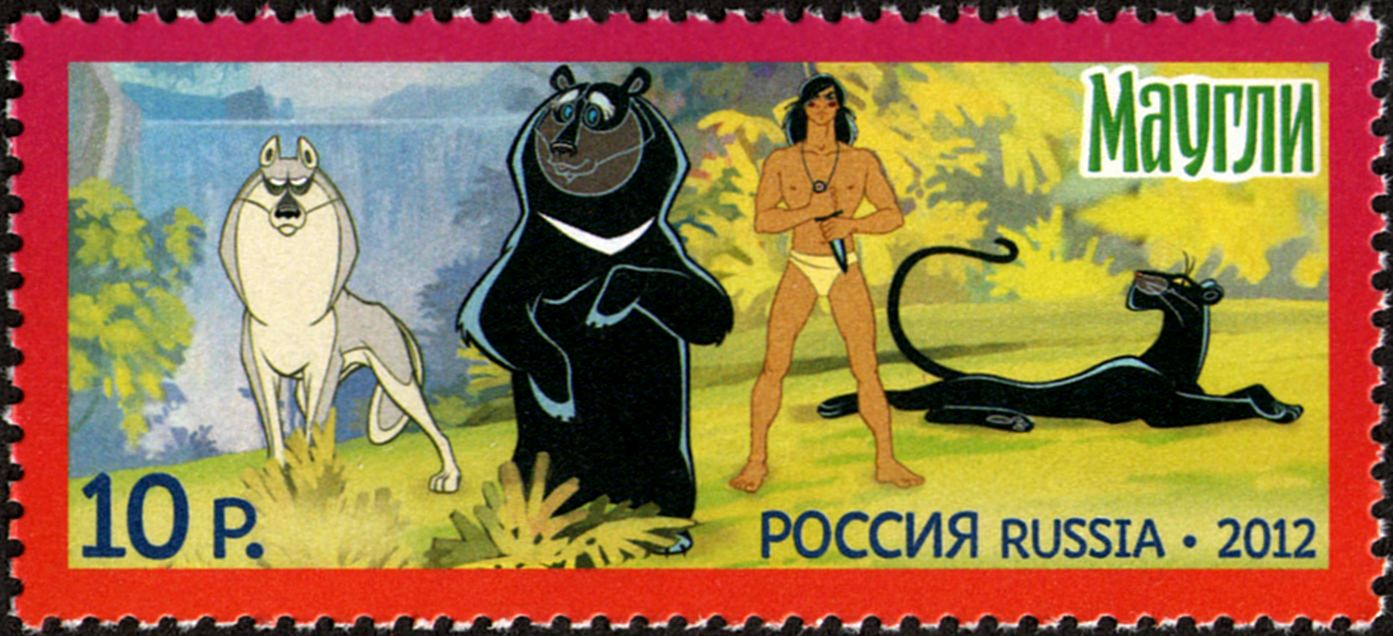
A Russian stamp showing Mowgli and other characters from The Jungle Book as depicted in a Soviet-era animated film

Bagheera is impressed with Mowgli's progress, but both are horrified when the man-cub then reveals that he has been visiting the Bandar-log ("Monkey-People") who are shunned by the rest of the jungle.

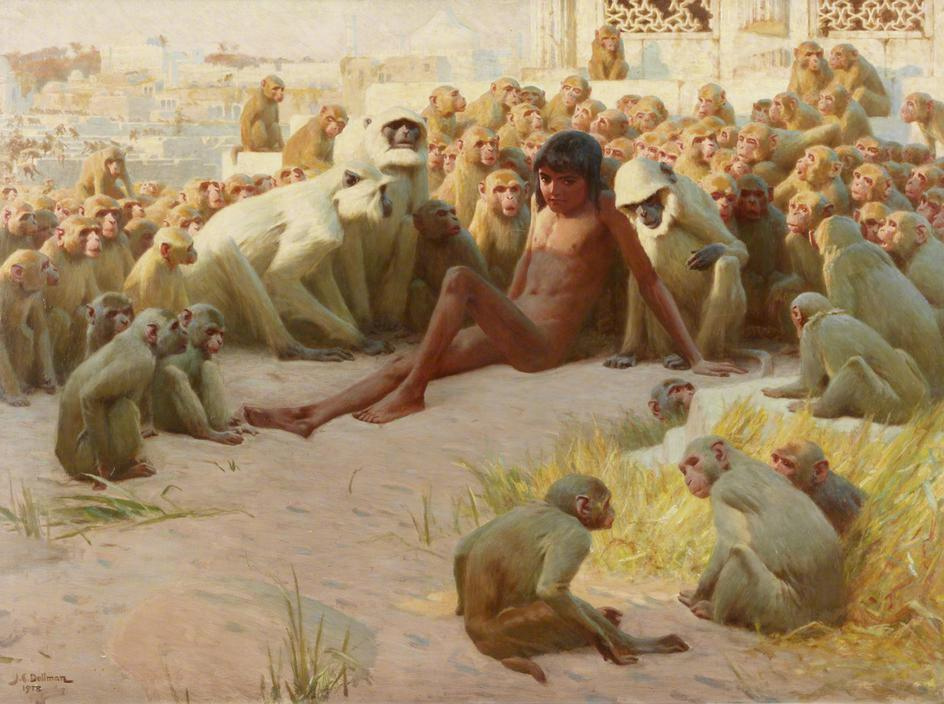
John Charles Dollman's painting of Mowgli among the Bandar Log

Mowgli is chastened, but soon afterward is abducted by the Bandar-log through the treetops. Seeing Chil the Kite, Mowgli gives the kites' Master Word and tells Chil to find Baloo and Bagheera. The bear and the panther, unable to follow the monkeys, recall that the monkeys' only fear is Kaa the python, and Bagheera goads the python into helping them by repeating (or inventing) some of the Bandar-log's insults against him. Here, Chil tells them Mowgli has been taken to the 'Cold Lairs', an abandoned human city, and they set off to rescue him. In the Cold Lairs, Mowgli soon realises that the monkeys only captured him as an amusing novelty. They soon become bored of him but refuse to let him go. When Kaa and Bagheera arrive the monkeys throw Mowgli into an abandoned "summer-house" inhabited by cobras, whereupon Mowgli hastily uses the snakes' Master Word to prevent them from striking. When Baloo and Bagheera arrive, a furious battle ensues. Kaa is delayed by a large section of city walls, but breaks down the wall of the summer house and frees Mowgli, who thanks him courteously. Kaa then scatters, and afterward hypnotises the Bandar-log into submission to himself. Baloo and Bagheera are also hypnotized, but Mowgli frees them. Once away, Bagheera advocates corporal punishment and Baloo opposes it. After "six love-taps" from Bagheera, the score is settled and the three of them go home.
