= Jungle Cubs =

American animated television series

- Genre: Animated series; Adventure; Children's television series; Comedy
- Created by: Mark S. Bernthal
- Based on: The Jungle Book by Rudyard Kipling The Jungle Book by Larry Clemmons; Ralph Wright; Ken Anderson; Vance Gerry; Bill Peet
- Voices of: Pamela Segall; Jim Cummings; Jason Marsden; Elizabeth Daily; Stephen Furst; Rob Paulsen; Dee Bradley Baker; Michael McKean; Cree Summer; David L. Lander; Tress MacNeille; Frank Welker; Tyler Mullen; Kath Soucie; April Winchell; Adam Wylie; Ed Gilbert; Tony Jay
- Theme music composer: Lou Rawls
- Opening theme: "Bare Necessities"
- Ending theme: "Bare Necessities" (instrumental)
- Composer: Stephen James Taylor
- Country of origin: United States
- Original language: English
- No. of seasons: 2
- No. of episodes: 21 (34 segments)

Production
- Executive producers: Tedd Anasti (season 2); Patsy Cameron (season 2)
- Producers: Chris Bartleman (season 2); Blair Peters (season 1); Kenny Thompkins (season 1)
- Editors: Peter Lonsdale; Robert S. Birchard; Carol Lewis; John Royer
- Running time: 22 minutes (11 minutes per segment)
- Production company: Walt Disney Television Animation (Note: Animation outsourced to Toon City Animation, Wang Film Productions, Sunmin Image Pictures, and Walt Disney Animation (Australia) with pre-production by Studio B Productions and additional production by Thai Wang Film Productions.)

Original release
- Network: ABC
- Release: October 5, 1996 – January 10, 1998

Jungle Cubs is an American animated series produced by Walt Disney Television Animation for ABC in 1996, serving as the prequel to the 1967 film The Jungle Book, the show focuses on the youth of the animal characters before the events of the film. A critical success, the show ran for two seasons on ABC from 1996 to 1998 before its syndication in re-runs on the Disney Channel. The show was broadcast on Toon Disney, but was taken off the schedule in 2001. Re-runs aired on Disney Jr. in the US from 2012 to 2013. The show also aired in the United Kingdom on Disney Cinemagic and in Latin America.

The show's theme song is a hip hop version of the song, "The Bare Necessities" performed by Lou Rawls. Jungle Cubs was animated by Walt Disney Television Animation (Australia) Pty. Ltd., Wang Film Productions Co., Ltd., Thai Wang Film Productions Co., Ltd., Toon City Animation, Inc., and Sunmin Image Pictures Co., Ltd., with Studio B Productions, as the animation pre-production studio of the series.

== Characters ==
The Jungle Cubs kids: Shere Khan, Kaa, Bagheera, Baloo, Hathi, and Louie.

- Baloo (voiced by Pamela Adlon) is a fun-loving sloth bear. He likes to play with his friends and sometimes pulls pranks on Bagheera in order to snap the latter out of his uptight attitude.
- Bagheera (voiced by Elizabeth Daily in Season 1 and Dee Bradley Baker in Season 2) is a sensible and level-headed panther who stays out of trouble. He has an obsession with maintaining good personal hygiene. Bagheera is affectionately known as "Baggy" or "Bags" and is the youngest of the group. Despite having a Home Counties English accent in the original film, Bagheera speaks with an American accent in the series.
- Louie (voiced by Jason Marsden in Season 1 and Cree Summer in Season 2) is an orangutan. He is very physically active, spending a great deal of his time in the trees and eating bananas, and wants to become king of the jungle one day, and when any man made objects turn up he immediately shows great interest.
- Shere Khan (voiced by Jason Marsden) is an arrogant and hot-tempered Bengal tiger. He often tries to intimidate the other animals, but his confidence suffers when faced with actual problems. He is often called "Khannie" by Baloo and Louie. Despite having a well-spoken English accent in the original film, Shere Khan speaks with an American accent in the series.
- Kaa (voiced by Jim Cummings) is a young Indian python who wants to hypnotize other animals, but his skills at hypnosis are unpredictable.
- Hathi (voiced by Rob Paulsen in Season 1 and Stephen Furst in Season 2) is an elephant who attempts to keep the group in order but is known to stammer when stressed. He has a huge crush on Winifred, who is his wife in The Jungle Book. He is often called "Little Peanut" by Baloo. Despite having a strong southern English accent in the original film, Hathi speaks with an American accent in the series.
- Cecil (voiced by Michael McKean) and Arthur (voiced by David Lander) are two vultures who are constantly hoping for one of the cubs to die so that they can eat them, but they are never seen as a threat.
- Mahra (voiced by Tress MacNeille) is a ruthless baboon that lives in Pinnacle Rock within the wasteland. She and her three incompetent sons have often antagonized the Jungle Cubs when they enter the wasteland. One particular instance is when she and her sons return from a long journey and she wants a new animal skin blanket after her old one is destroyed.
  - Ned (voiced by Charlie Adler) is one of Mahra's sons.
  - Jed (voiced by Jim Cummings) is the leader of Mahra's sons.
  - Fred (voiced by Jim Cummings) is the largest and most dull-witted of Mahra's sons.

== Episodes ==
=== Series overview ===
Season	Segments	Episodes	Originally released	
Season	Segments	Episodes	First released	Last released
1	19	13	October 5, 1996	December 28, 1996
2	15	8	October 11, 1997	January 10, 1998

=== Season 1 (1996) ===
No. overall	No. in season	Title	Directed by	Written by	Storyboard by	Original release date
1	1	"A Night in the Wasteland"	Kenny Thompkins	Sam Graham and Chris Hubbell	Jill Colbert, Denise Koyama, Michael A. Swanigan and Phil Weinstein	October 5, 1996
Attempting to prove his courage after a joke by Louie and Baloo, Shere Khan vows to travel to Pinnacle Rock in the wasteland unaware that the ruthless baboon Mahra and her sons Ned, Jed, and Fred have returned and Mahra wants a new fur blanket. Note: This is the first two-part episode of the series. Song: "Take Your Sweet Sweet Time"
2	2	"How the Panther Lost His Roar"	Mircea Mantta	Carter Crocker; Story editors : Sam Graham and Chris Hubbell	Michael Bennett and Victor Cook	October 12, 1996
2	2	"The Humans Must Be Crazy"	Kenny Thompkins	Dev Ross; Story editors : Sam Graham and Chris Hubbell	Robert Onorato and Norma Rivera	October 12, 1996
Bagheera's feelings of inadequacy when compared to Khan are worsened when he loses his voice. Bagheera becomes convinced that an old pocket-watch will make him a great hunter.
3	3	"Hathi Meets His Match"	Kenny Thompkins	Story editors : Sam Graham and Chris Hubbell	Enrique May	October 19, 1996
3	3	"Buffaloed"	Kenny Thompkins	Jane Kagon and Ed Greenberg; Story editors : Sam Graham and Chris Hubbell	Alan Wright	October 19, 1996
A young female elephant named Winifred is separated from her family – owned by humans – after a fire in their village, and runs into Hathi. Khan is tricked into fighting against an elderly water buffalo by Cecil and Arthur. When he finds out, he gets help from Baloo to get even with the vultures.
4	4	"Mondo Mungo"	Kenny Thompkins	Sam Graham and Chris Hubbell	Carin-Anne Anderson	October 26, 1996
4	4	"Bare Necessities"	Kenny Thompkins	Carter Crocker; Story editors : Sam Graham and Chris Hubbell	Alan Wright	October 26, 1996
Kaa befriends a young mongoose named "Mungo" and the pair strike up a friendship despite being natural enemies. The Cub's attempts to prepare for the monsoon season are hampered by Baloo's laziness, but he soon becomes their only hope when they are trapped in a cave as the monsoons begin.
5	5	"Who Wants to Be a Baboon?"	Mircea Mantta	Peter Lawrence; Story editors : Sam Graham and Chris Hubbell	Jill Colbert and John Flagg	November 2, 1996
After being the victim of one too many jokes, Louie leaves the Cubs and becomes Mahra's assistant.
6	6	"Red Dogs"	Mircea Mantta	Sam Graham and Chris Hubbell	Carin-Anne Anderson, Alan Wright and Suraiya Daud	November 9, 1996
Louie tricks Kaa into believing that Baloo's sleepwalking is the result of his attempts at hypnosis, sending Kaa out after Baloo just as the lethal red dogs return to The Jungle, with only Baloo to save the day. Note: This episode was inspired by "Red Dog", a chapter from Rudyard Kipling's The Second Jungle Book.
7	7	"The Great Kaadini"	Kenny Thompkins	Sam Graham and Chris Hubbell	Victor Cook	November 16, 1996
Kaa accidentally hypnotizes the vultures whilst trying to hypnotize himself, turning them into competent hunters totally obedient to his commands. Song: "Kaa's Song"
8	8	"Hulla Baloo"	Mircea Mantta	Arthur Sellers; Story editors : Sam Graham and Chris Hubbell	Carin-Anne Anderson and Victor Cook	November 23, 1996
8	8	"Shere Bliss"	Kenny Thompkins	Seth MacFarlane; Story editors : Sam Graham and Chris Hubbell	Joe Horne	November 23, 1996
Louie becomes jealous when Baloo begins to spend more time with another bear after he saved his life. When Khan becomes a more fun-loving cat after a bump on the head, the Cubs find themselves trying to bring him back to normal.
9	9	"Treasure of The Middle Jungle"	Mircea Mantta	Peter Lawrence; Story editors : Sam Graham and Chris Hubbell	Enrique May and Robert Onorato	November 30, 1996
When a shrew tells the animals about the long-lost 'Treasure of the Middle Jungle', the group - minus Bagheera and Hathi - set out to find it, only to come face-to-face with the massive Cobra Whitehood. Note: This episode was inspired by "The King's Ankus", a chapter from Rudyard Kipling's The Second Jungle Book. Song: "When We Find Our Treasure"
10	10	"Feather Brains"	Kenny Thompkins	Sam Graham and Chris Hubbell	Jill Colbert	December 7, 1996
10	10	"Benny & Clyde"	Mircea Mantta	Gordon Kent; Story editors : Sam Graham and Chris Hubbell	Jill Colbert	December 7, 1996
Cecil falls in love with a female vulture named Clarice and kicks Arthur out of the nest. Arthur then, unsuccessfully, tries to bond with Khan. Louie is forced to look after his younger cousins.
11	11	"Splendor in the Mud"	Kenny Thompkins	Dev Ross; Story editors : Sam Graham and Chris Hubbell	Jill Colbert and Victor Cook	December 14, 1996
When the boys play a few pranks, Winifred's uncle gets very upset and tells Hathi that he will never see her again. After her uncle gets hurt by a mother rhinoceros he feels very ill, and he wants to find the red clay in the wasteland for him to recover, the cubs become his only hope. Song: "Jungle Cub Love"
12	12	"Trouble on the Waterfront"	Mircea Mantta	Jane Kagon and Ed Greenberg; Story editors : Sam Graham and Chris Hubbell	Enrique May	December 21, 1996
12	12	"Fool Me Once..."	Mircea Mantta	Arthur Sellers; Story editors : Sam Graham and Chris Hubbell	Robert Onorato	December 21, 1996
The Cubs break out into violent arguments when a drought destroys almost their entire water supply. After a particularly harsh prank by Baloo and Louie, a sad and depressed Bagheera fakes his death to get even. Note: The first segment was inspired by "How Fear Came", a chapter from Rudyard Kipling's The Second Jungle Book, in which there is a drought in the jungle and a limited water supply.
13	13	"The Coming of the Wolves"	Mircea Mantta	Sam Graham and Chris Hubbell	Carin-Anne Anderson, Robert Onorato and Alan Wright	December 28, 1996
The cubs find themselves caught between two runaway wolves: Akela and his pregnant mate Leah who hide at the temple to evade their pack led by villainous alpha wolf Cain.

=== Season 2 (1997–98) ===
No. overall	No. in season	Title	Directed by	Written by	Storyboard by	Original release date
14	1	"The Ape Who Would Be King"	Chris Bartleman	Tedd Anasti and Patsy Cameron	Louie Escauriaga, Lazarino Baarde, Steve Gan, Renato Otacan and Alan Wright	October 11, 1997
The Cubs learn of a prophecy that states that Louie will some day be king of the jungle, but Khan wants the role for himself. Song: "Everything's Gonna Be Right with the World"
15	2	"Trunks For The Memories"	Chris Bartleman	Tedd Anasti & Patsy Cameron	Lazarino Baarde, Steve Gan and David Earl	October 18, 1997
15	2	"Kasaba Ball"	Chris Bartleman	Lesa Kite	Lazarino Baarde, Steve Gan and David Earl	October 18, 1997
Hathi's best friend Johar may have to part ways with him when the elephant herd breaks in two due to a food shortage. The Cubs divide into teams - Louie, Bagheera, and Baloo against Khan, a monkey named Lepe, and the inappropriately-named rhinoceros 'Tiny' - in a game of 'Kasaba Ball' (the jungle's equivalent of football).
16	3	"Hathi's Makeover"	Chris Bartleman	Lesa Kite	Louie Escauriaga, Lazarino Baarde, Steve Gan and David Earl	October 25, 1997
16	3	"Curse of The Magnificent Melon"	Chris Bartleman	Tedd Anasti & Patsy Cameron	Louie Escauriaga, Lazarino Baarde, Steve Gan and David Earl	October 25, 1997
Hathi tries to become a different kind of animal after he becomes ashamed of being an elephant. After stealing Hathi's prized melon, Baloo finds himself apparently followed by a mass of frogs accusing him of the crime.
17	4	"The Five Bananas"	Chris Bartleman	Michael Karnow & Lance Khazei	Lazarino Baarde, Steve Gan and David Earl	November 1, 1997
17	4	"Birthday Snake"	Chris Bartleman	Story by : Don London; Teleplay by : Roger Reitzel	Lazarino Baarde, Steve Gan and David Earl	November 1, 1997
The cubs form a band for an upcoming talent show, but split before the show starts because each of them believes they are the most important instrument in the band. Kaa resorts to hypnosis when he thinks that the others have forgotten his birthday.
18	5	"Old Green Teeth"	Chris Bartleman	Peter Hirsch	Louie Escauriaga	November 8, 1997
18	5	"The Elephant Who Couldn't Say No"	Blair Peters	Tedd Anasti & Patsy Cameron	David Earl	November 8, 1997
Louie suffers a crisis of confidence when the Five Bananas are invited to perform for an old idol of his. Hathi's inability to say 'no' to anyone results in him having to abandon a game of shadow puppets, with Winifred who is forced to take care of a basket full of crazy woodpeckers that was passed from a sloth to a bighorn sheep to a crane to a warthog and into Hathi's possession.
19	6	"Hair Ball"	Chris Bartleman	Scott Gimple	Steve Gan, David Earl and Eduardo Soriano	November 15, 1997
19	6	"A Tale of Two Tails"	Blair Peters and Mauro Casalese	Teleplay by : David Wiemers and Roger Reitzel	Steve Gan, David Earl and Eduardo Soriano	November 15, 1997
Bagheera runs away from the jungle in embarrassment after coughing up a hairball in front of the entire jungle, resulting in him joining the 'Embarrassment Club', consisting of various animals who unintentionally humiliated themselves in public. Kaa and Khan take advantage of Louie's kindness after they sustain "injuries" to their tails while saving him.
20	7	"Waiting For Baloo"	Chris Bartleman	Story by : David Wiemers; Teleplay by : Roger Reitzel	Rento Otacan and David Earl	November 22, 1997
20	7	"Tree For Two"	Blair Peters	Story by : Lesa Kite; Teleplay by : Peter Hirsch	Rento Otacan and David Earl	November 22, 1997
Baloo is entrusted with delivering a bunch of bananas to the baboons and the Buffaloes. Bagheera and Louie have difficulty getting along when they are forced to live together after a storm destroys their old homes.
21	8	"Nice Tiger"	Chris Bartleman and Blair Peters	Tedd Anasti & Patsy Cameron	Dave Pemberton, Steve Gan and David Earl	January 10, 1998
21	8	"Sleepless In The Jungle"	Mauro Casalese	Tedd Anasti & Patsy Cameron	Dave Pemberton, Steve Gan and David Earl	January 10, 1998
Khan tries to convince the other cubs that there's nothing nice about him, but they all think differently. Baloo has difficulty sleeping due to his concerns about the potential water shortage. Note: This is the first and only episode to have "The Bare Necessities" sung, outside of the opening sequence.

== Voice cast ==
- Pamela Segall as Baloo
- E.G. Daily as Bagheera (Season 1)
- Dee Bradley Baker as Bagheera (Season 2)
- Jason Marsden as Shere Khan, Louie (Season 1), Benny
- Cree Summer as Louie (Season 2)
- Rob Paulsen as Hathi (Season 1), Akela
- Stephen Furst as Hathi (Season 2)
- Jim Cummings as Kaa, Fred, Jed, Older Louie, Older Hathi, Older Kaa, Older Bagheera, Cain
- David Lander as Arthur
- Michael McKean as Cecil

=== Additional voices ===
- Adam Wylie as Mungo
- Andrew J. Ferchland
- April Winchell as Mother Bird, Shrew, Old Monkey Lady
- Bebe Neuwirth as LaasLa
- Brandy Norwood as Latecia
- Charlie Adler as Ned
- Dorien Wilson as Yarren
- Ed Gilbert as Older Baloo
- Frank Welker as Crane, Crocodile, Frogs, Rhino
- Gretchen Palmer as Old Monkey Lady
- Jeannie Elias as Clyde
- Jeff Bennett as McCoy
- Jess Harnell as Toucan
- Kath Soucie as Grandma Kahn, Mommie Mouse, Mother Duck, Winifred, Leah
- Kenneth Mars as Buffalo
- Mari Morrow as Juwanna
- Susan Tolsky as Clarisse
- Tony Jay as Older Shere Khan
- Tress MacNeille as Mahra
- Vanessa Williams as Trech
- Vivica A. Fox as Lima
- Yolanda Snowball as Beckie
- Yvette Wilson as Kateri

== Crew ==
- Lou Rawls - Singer
- Jamie Thomason - Voice Casting Director & Dialogue Director

== Home media ==
=== VHS releases ===
==== US releases ====
Two VHS releases containing 6 episodes of the series were released in the United States.

VHS name	Episode titles	Release date
Cub House Fun	"Hathi Meets His Match" "A Night in the Wasteland" "Mondo Mungo"	June 12, 1996
Crazy Congo Capers	"The Great Kaadini" "How the Panther Lost His Roar" "Who Wants to be a Baboon?"	April 13, 1997

==== UK, Australia and New Zealand releases ====
Three VHS releases containing 11 episodes of the series were released in Australia and New Zealand, while the first volume saw a release in the UK and would later be re-released on DVD. These international releases included newly-animated wraparounds set at unspecified points during the original film with Mowgli (voiced by Tyler Mullen) interacting with the characters as adults, as they recall events from their childhood through the series' episodes. In these segments, Baloo is voiced by Ed Gilbert, Bagheera, Hathi, Kaa and Louie are voiced by Jim Cummings and Shere Khan is voiced by Tony Jay. Gilbert, Cummings and Jay reprised their roles from TaleSpin.

VHS name	Episode titles	Release date
Jungle Cubs (Volume 1): Born to be Wild	"A Night in the Wasteland" "How the Panther Lost His Roar" "Red Dogs"	August 15, 1997
Jungle Cubs (Volume 2): Once Upon a Vine	"Who Wants to be a Baboon?" "Hathi Meets His Match" "The Treasure of the Middle Jungle"	February 27, 1998
Jungle Cubs (Volume 3): Monkey Business	"The Great Kaadini" "Benny & Clyde" "The Coming of the Wolves"	May 15, 1998

=== DVD releases ===
On September 8, 2003, one DVD containing three episodes of the series was released in the United Kingdom.

DVD name	Episode titles	Release date
Born to Be Wild	"A Night in the Wasteland" "How the Panther Lost His Roar" "Red Dogs"	September 8, 2003

==== Australian and New Zealand releases ====
On September 12, 2003, three DVDs containing eleven episodes of the series was released in Australia and New Zealand.

DVD name	Episode titles	Release date
Born to be Wild	"A Night in the Wasteland" "How the Panther Lost His Roar" "Red Dogs"	September 12, 2003
Once Upon a Vine	"Who Wants to be a Baboon?" "The Humans Must Be Crazy" "Hathi Meets His Match" "Mondo Mungo" "The Treasure of the Middle Jungle"	September 12, 2003
Monkey Business	"The Great Kaadini" "Benny & Clyde" "The Coming of the Wolves"	September 12, 2003

=== Digital releases ===
In 2016, the entire series was made available for purchase on digital in the United States through Amazon Instant Video, ITunes, and Google Play.
