= Shere Khan =

Character from The Jungle Book

- The Jungle Book character
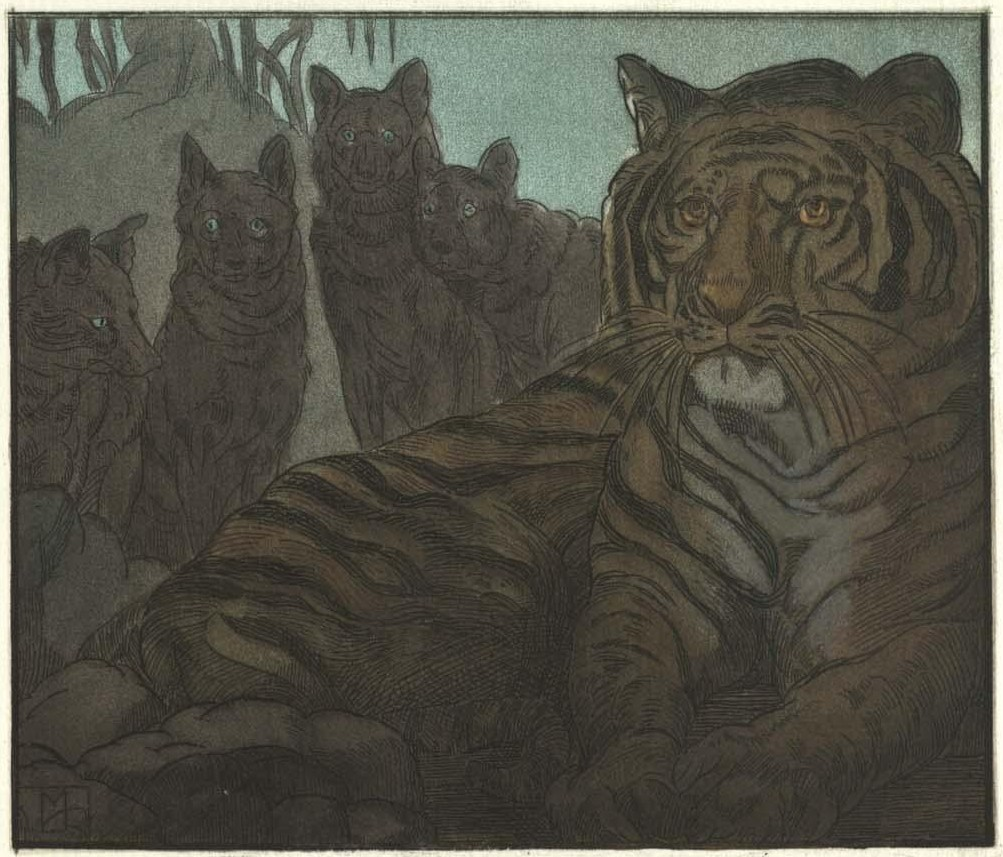
- Shere Khan and his wolf followers, as illustrated by Maurice de Becque in a 1924 French edition of The Jungle Book
- First appearance: "Mowgli's Brothers"
- Created by: Rudyard Kipling

In-universe information
- Nickname: Lungri
- Species: Bengal tiger
- Gender: Male

Shere Khan (/ˈʃɪər ˈkɑːn/) is a fictional Bengal tiger featured in the Mowgli stories of Rudyard Kipling's Jungle Book. He is often portrayed as the main antagonist in the book's media adaptations, itself an exaggeration of his role in the original stories, in which he only appears a third of the time. Shere Khan is named after Afghan Emperor Sher Shah Suri. Khan is a title of distinction among the Turco-Mongol peoples, usually meaning chief or ruler. According to The Kipling Society, the name shows that Shere Khan "is the chief among tigers".

The character was born with a birth defect, a crippled leg, so his mother gave him the derisive nickname "Lungri" ("The Lame One"). Despite this condition, Shere Khan is prideful and regards himself as the "rightful" lord of the jungle.

== The original Jungle Book stories ==
Shere Khan is depicted by Kipling as having been born with a crippled leg, so his mother gave him the derisive nickname "Lungri" ("The Lame One"). Despite this condition, Shere Khan is prideful and regards himself as the "rightful" lord of the jungle. The only creature who looks up to him is Tabaqui, a spineless and hated golden jackal. (Note: In Hindi, lungri is the adjective's female form. The corresponding male form would be lungra, लंगड़ा. See or)

In "Mowgli's Brothers", Shere Khan's failed attempt to hunt humans causes a human "cub" to stray from its parents. When Shere Khan discovers the infant, it has been adopted by Indian wolves, Raksha and Father Wolf, who have named the child Mowgli. Mowgli is accepted into Akela's wolf pack and is protected by Bagheera (a panther) and Baloo (a bear). Furious at losing his kill, the tiger swears that the boy will be his some day. While Mowgli is growing up, Shere Khan infiltrates the wolf pack by promising the younger wolves rich rewards once Akela is deposed. When the young wolves manoeuvre Akela into missing his kill, the pack council meets to kill and replace him. Shere Khan threatens to take over their hunting territory if the wolves do not give him Mowgli. Having been warned by Bagheera, Mowgli attacks Shere Khan and his allies with a burning branch (the mysterious and powerful "red flower" of man) and drives them away. Akela leaves the pack to become a lone hunter. Mowgli goes to the human village but swears that he will return one day with Shere Khan's skin and lay it upon Council Rock.

Shere Khan also appears in the story "How Fear Came", which is set between the first and second halves of the "Mowgli's Brothers", and probably sometime after "Kaa's Hunting". In this story, the tiger comes to drink from the river just after having killed a human purely for sport, leading Hathi the elephant to tell the story of why tigers, out of all the animals in the jungle, are allowed to hunt humans for pleasure at certain times. This story, in which Mowgli appears mainly as an observer, may be seen as a direct ancestor of Kipling's Just So Stories.

In "Tiger! Tiger!", Mowgli is adopted by Messua and her husband and learns human ways. In this short story, Mowgli learns that the villagers have heard of the tiger Shere Khan, who also has a bounty on his head, but believe that the tiger is lame because he is the reincarnation of a money-lender injured in a riot. When Mowgli scoffs at these fanciful tales, the villagers decide to put him to work herding buffalo. He then meets his wolf friend Grey Brother, who tells him that Shere Khan is still planning to kill him. Grey Brother forces Tabaqui to tell him where and when Shere Khan is planning to strike, then kills the jackal. With the help of Akela, Grey Brother and Mowgli trap Shere Khan in a narrow canyon and incite the buffalo to stampede him to death. Mowgli then skins Shere Khan's hide, briefly interrupted by the arrival of the village hunter Buldeo, who tries to take the tiger's skin for himself only to be driven off by Akela. At the end of the story, Mowgli makes good on his promise and lays the skin of Shere Khan upon the Council Rock and dances upon it in victory before the wolves.

== In adaptations and other media ==
=== Disney versions ===
==== The Jungle Book ====
Shere Khan as he appears in the 1967 Disney film.

In Disney's 1967 animated adaptation of The Jungle Book, Shere Khan's voice was performed by George Sanders, while his singing voice was provided by Bill Lee and Thurl Ravenscroft and his roars were performed by Jimmy MacDonald. He was designed and animated by animator Milt Kahl. This version of the character depicts him without the crippled leg he had in the source material. The inhabitants of the jungle fear him greatly; mere news of his being in the vicinity compels the wolf pack to send Mowgli away. Man's gun and fire are the only things Shere Khan fears, and consequently, he feels the urge to kill humans whenever the opportunity presents itself. Shere Khan first appears about two-thirds of the way through the film where, after having been interrupted during a hunt by Colonel Hathi, he eavesdrops on Bagheera asking the elephants to help search for a now-lost Mowgli and sets out to find and kill the boy. He later encounters Kaa just as he was going to eat Mowgli, but the snake denies any knowledge of the man-cub. Doubting Kaa's honesty, Shere Khan threatens Kaa into showing his middle by loosening his coils, inadvertently allowing Mowgli to escape after which the tiger resumes his search.

In the climax, Shere Khan finds Mowgli, who refuses to run and instead stands up against the tiger, saying that he is not afraid. Impressed by Mowgli's bravery, Shere Khan, for his own amusement, gives him a 10-second head start to run away. But Mowgli still refuses and grabs a stick, intent on fighting the tiger. Shere Khan becomes annoyed and immediately attempts to attack Mowgli, who flinches in fear, finally understanding the true danger of the ferocious beast. Fortunately, Baloo arrives in the nick of time and grabs Shere Khan by the tail. Mowgli then hits Shere Khan with his stick. Enraged, he chases Mowgli while dragging Baloo behind him, but the vultures manage to fly Mowgli to safety. Baloo's interference proves such a nuisance to Shere Khan that he decides to savage the bear, nearly killing him. Upon learning that Shere Khan is afraid of fire, Mowgli grabs a burning branch from a tree struck by a bolt of lightning, and the vultures distract Shere Khan long enough for Mowgli to tie the branch to his tail. Seeing the fire, Shere Khan panics and is forced to flee with the branch burning his back.

==== The Jungle Book 2 ====
Shere Khan returned (and had more on-screen time) in The Jungle Book 2. Humiliated by the ordeal of his tail being tied to a burning branch in the original film, the tiger has sworn to kill Mowgli for revenge. He first searches the Man Village and is chased off by the villagers. He then searches the jungle for Mowgli and is lied to by Kaa, who tells him that Mowgli is at the swamp out of fear, and being pestered by Lucky, a new but dim-witted member of the vultures, who accidentally reveals Mowgli's whereabouts before Shere Khan violently attacks him for his jokes, causing the other 4 vultures to fly away in fear. Shere Khan and Mowgli ultimately meet again as Mowgli tries to reconcile with Shanti and Ranjan, who, unbeknownst to him, were cornered by the tiger at that very moment. Barely escaping, Mowgli hides in an abandoned temple surrounded by lava. Shanti, Ranjan, Baloo, and Bagheera hurry to save Mowgli. After Baloo and Shanti team up, they, along with Mowgli, confuse Shere Khan by banging three different gongs. Eventually, Shanti's gong collapses, giving away her hiding place. Shere Khan threatens to kill Shanti instead unless Mowgli comes out of hiding, forcing Mowgli to reveal himself. Shere Khan then chases the two of them, despite Baloo's efforts to slow him down. Mowgli and Shanti jump over a pit of molten lava and grab onto the head of a tiger statue. Shere Khan leaps across and corners the children. Before he can kill them, the statue falls under his weight taking the three of them with it. Shanti and Mowgli are saved by Baloo while Shere Khan falls onto a stone slab in the lava pit, and the statue lands on top of him, trapping him inside its mouth. He is last seen being taunted by Lucky. In The Jungle Book 2, Shere Khan was voiced by Tony Jay, who reprised his role from the Disney Afternoon series TaleSpin.

==== TaleSpin ====
Shere Khan appeared in the 1990-1991 Disney Afternoon series TaleSpin, which anthropomorphised a number of animal characters from the 1967 Jungle Book. Khan was depicted as the wealthy mogul of Khan Industries in the harbour city of Cape Suzette. He was a nominal villain who occasionally took enjoyment in driving small companies out of business to expand his own enterprise, but sometimes allied with the heroes when it suited him. Tony Jay provided his voice, and would do so again in The Jungle Book 2 (2003), which restored Khan to a more conventional portrayal.

==== 1994 live-action film ====
In the 1994 live-action film The Jungle Book, Shere Khan is presented as a more sympathetic character. In the film, Shere Khan does not kill for sport, and his sole goal is to protect the jungle from those who break "the laws of the jungle" (the most basic of which are killing to eat or to keep from being eaten), including humans who trespass with guns and kill animals for fun instead of food. At the beginning of the film, he sees two British guards and a hunter named Buldeo shooting animals for sport and becomes enraged at this. That night, he attacks the humans' camp in revenge for the animals' death and kills Mowgli's father Nathoo in response to him defending Buldeo. Other than killing Nathoo, Shere Khan also kills a guard and a British sergeant named Claiborne, both of whom were responsible for the jungle law being broken alongside Buldeo. This event is what led Mowgli to be separated from civilization and to live in the jungle to survive.

Shere Khan is not seen again until the second half of the film, which takes place twenty years after the first act, when he spots several hunters (led by Captain William Boone) and roars to announce his approach. He goes on to maul Lieutenant Wilkins (a henchman of Boone) to death when he gets separated. Following Boone's death by Kaa, Shere Khan and Mowgli meet face to face for the first time. Shere Khan is obviously distrusting of Mowgli and all humans. He attempts to scare Mowgli away by roaring in his face, but Mowgli stubbornly roars back and stares Shere Khan down. Seeing Mowgli's courage, Shere Khan develops a newfound respect for him, and begins to see him as a fellow "creature of the jungle". Because of this, Shere Khan spares Mowgli and allows him and his friend Katherine Brydon to leave peacefully.

==== Jungle Cubs ====
Shere Khan also appears in the 1996 Disney animated series Jungle Cubs, where he is a tiger cub. He is more of a bully than a predator but is friends with the other characters. Shere Khan is voiced by Jason Marsden. The producers originally wanted Shere Khan to keep his British accent for the show, but later changed their mind, and Shere Khan ended up with an American accent, completely different from that of his adult version. The adult version of himself appears in the Jungle Cubs: Born to be Wild video (again voiced by Tony Jay), and in these cut scenes, he attempts to kill Mowgli when Mowgli, Baloo and Bagheera walk into his part of the jungle. Baloo and Bagheera try to reason with Shere Khan by recounting the "Red Dogs" story, in which they and the other animals saved Shere Khan's life, but Shere Khan refuses to listen and says to them the past is the past. Baloo then throws a stone at a beehive and grabs Shere Khan by the head, letting go only when the beehive falls on his head. Shere Khan, with the beehive still on his head, runs away from the angry bees.

==== The Jungle Book: Mowgli's Story ====
Shere Khan appears once again as a villain in the 1998 film The Jungle Book: Mowgli's Story, where he is voiced by Sherman Howard and accompanied by his sidekick Tabaqui, who in this version is a spotted hyena. In the film, he kills Raksha in Monkey Town when she comes to rescue Mowgli. During the final battle, Mowgli uses fire in order to banish Shere Khan from his jungle. Shere Khan complies and leaves the jungle.

==== 2016 live-action/CGI hybrid film ====
Shere Khan in promotional material for The Jungle Book (2016).

Idris Elba voices Shere Khan in the 2016 live-action film The Jungle Book. In this incarnation, Shere Khan has several noticeable burns, including a blinded left eye. He also hates humans and views them all as a threat, much as his previous Disney incarnation does. When interviewed regarding the character, Elba described Shere Khan as the "lord of the jungle", a creature "that reigns with fear" and that he "terrorizes everyone he encounters because he comes from a place of fear."

Shere Khan first appears during the drought, when the animals gather to drink at Peace Rock, a watering hole where the animals maintain a water truce not to devour each other while quenching their thirst. Upon scenting Mowgli, he threatens to kill him as man is not allowed to live in the jungle. Raksha, Mowgli's adoptive mother, retorts that they do not see him as the jungle's ruler; and that he has no right to dictate rules since he breaks them himself. This causes Akela and his wolf pack to debate whether to have Mowgli leave. When Mowgli leaves the wolf pack with Bagheera, Shere Khan ambushes him en route and fights with Bagheera. Though Shere Khan defeats and mildly injures Bagheera, Mowgli escapes with the aid of a stampeding water buffalo herd. During Kaa's attempt to hypnotize Mowgli, she reveals that Shere Khan himself is responsible for Mowgli being found by Bagheera, as he killed Mowgli's father (an event that left him with his burns and even more passionate hatred for humans).

Shere Khan later returns to confront Akela's pack and demand Mowgli is turned over to him, killing Akela by grabbing him in his jaws and throwing the wolf leader off a cliff when he learns that Mowgli is on his way to the Man-village. He then assumes control of the wolves, confident that Mowgli will return as he orders them to spread the word. Later that night, Shere Khan tells the wolf pups the story of the cuckoo bird as an insult to Raksha. He admits to Raksha that he never wanted Mowgli to leave the jungle, he wanted him dead.

When Mowgli hears of Akela's death, he returns to face Shere Khan at the river with a burning torch stolen from the Man-village. Shere Khan points out that he has accidentally started a wildfire in the process, and that the animals now have more reason to fear Mowgli than Shere Khan. When Mowgli throws away the torch, Shere Khan attempts to attack the now unarmed Mowgli; but is blocked by Baloo, Bagheera and the wolf pack who are inspired by Mowgli's courage and stand up to Shere Khan while reciting the mantra of the wolf. Infuriated by this defiance and insult to his self-proclaimed reign, he roars in fury while unleashing his true behavior as a vicious tiger; now attempting to kill all the animals just to get to Mowgli. However, the combined efforts of Baloo, Bagheera and the wolf pack keep him distracted long enough for Mowgli to set a trap in the burning jungle nearby. During their battle, Mowgli lures Shere Khan onto a dead strangler fig tree and eventually defeats him by causing him to fall roaring to his death into the fires below.

==== Other ====
Shere Khan was to appear in cancelled Disney's The Jungle Book 3, a sequel to Disney's original animated films where he and Baloo were to be taken to a Russian circus and Shere Khan was to change his ways and become good.

In the Descendants novel, The Isle of the Lost, Shere Khan is an inmate on the Isle of the Lost and attends the birthday party of the Evil Queen's daughter, Evie.

=== Mowgli: Legend of the Jungle (2018) ===
In the 2018 live-action film Mowgli: Legend of the Jungle, Shere Khan is portrayed in motion-capture and voice-over by Benedict Cumberbatch. This version of Shere Khan bears a closer resemblance to his novel counterpart in that he is crippled with a deformed front leg. He is also considerably more sinister than previous incarnations as he continually strives to gain more power and influence among the jungle's creatures as he seeks to kill Mowgli. Shere Khan first appears in the beginning of the film breaking jungle law by killing Mowgli's parents. When the infant Mowgli escapes him thanks to the intervention of Bagheera and the wolf pack, Shere Khan is informed of his whereabouts by his hyena minion Tabaqui and challenges Akela for him. When this fails, Shere Khan leaves for many years until he announces his return by killing man's cattle and leaving it for Baloo and the pack to find. He also pursues Mowgli during the latter's swim and subsequent escape, but fails to catch him after Mowgli falls into a tiger pit and an elephant rescues him. Shere Khan next appears when the Bandar-Log monkeys bring Mowgli to him on Tabaqui's orders, where he tries to eat Mowgli while the boy has been knocked unconscious. The intervention of Baloo, Bagheera and Kaa stops Shere Khan, and he waits until Akela is challenged for leadership to try to claim the boy again after Akela fails to catch a deer, but Mowgli drives him away with a burning branch taken from the Man-Village. Afterwards, Shere Khan divides the wolf pack with his followers haranguing and raiding Akela's pack and their allies. Mowgli, having lived in the Man-Village and seeking to rid the jungle of the tiger's influence, calls out Shere Khan. The boy then faces off against the tiger, aided by the elephants before he manages to mortally wound Shere Khan. However, the hunter pursuing Shere Khan, John Lockwood, accidentally grazes Mowgli with a bullet and shoots Akela as he stops the tiger from killing Mowgli causing the elephant whose tusk was shot off by Lockwood to intervene and kill the hunter to prevent more death. As the other animals rally to Mowgli, Shere Khan slinks away and collapses, playing dead to try to lure Mowgli in. Mowgli fails to let his guard down and kills Shere Khan with his knife as the tiger tries to kill him, ending his reign of terror once and for all.

=== Other appearances ===
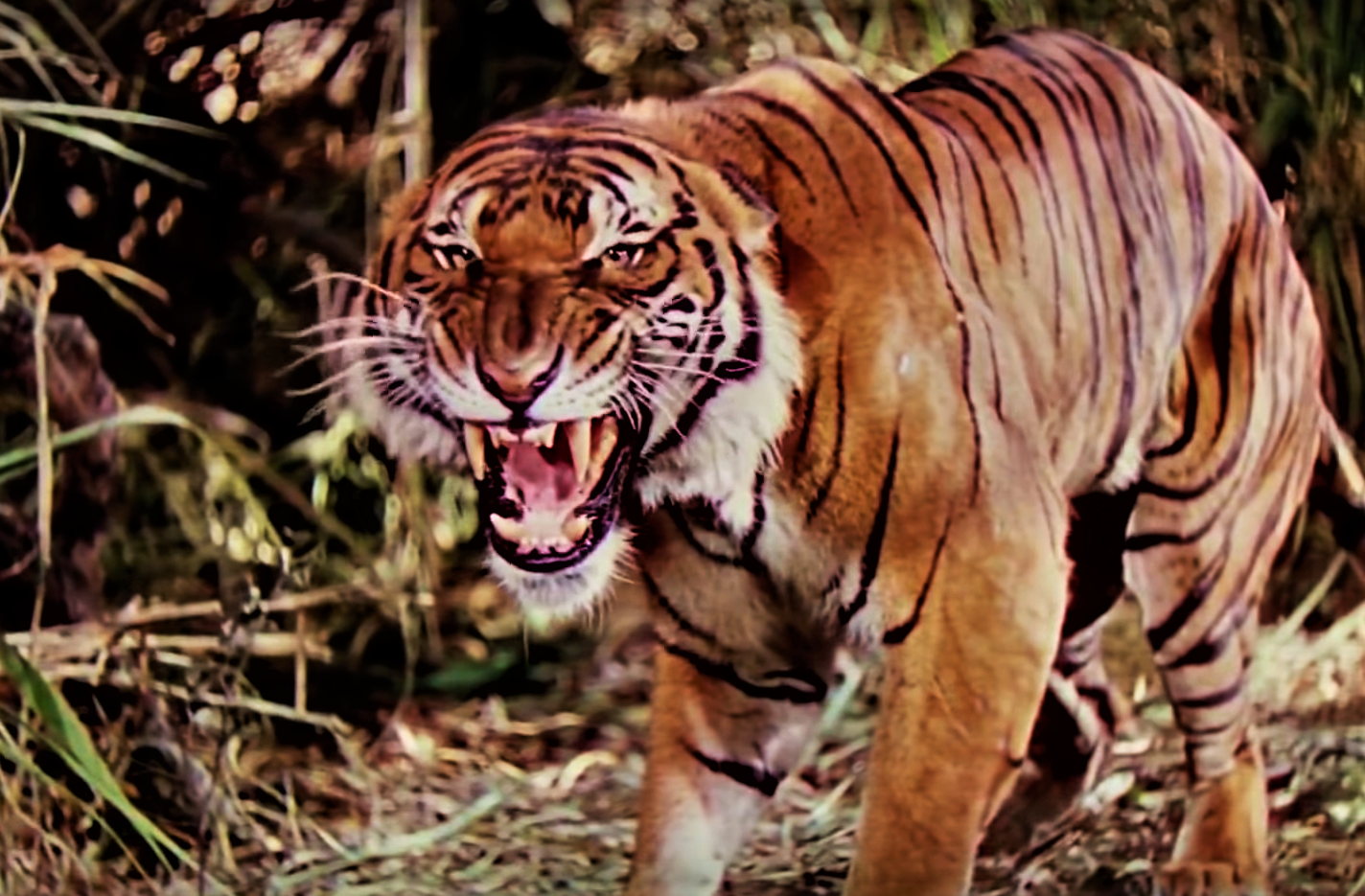
Shere Khan in the 1942 film.

- Shere Khan appeared in the 1942 film adaptation by the Hungarian brothers, Zoltan and Alexander Korda, with the screenplay written by Laurence Stallings.
- In the 1967 Russian animated short series Adventures of Mowgli, Shere Khan is voiced by Anatoli Papanov in Russian and by Scott McNeil in the English-language version.
- In the 1976 animated television adaptation of "Mowgli's Brothers", all the male characters, including Shere Khan, are voiced by narrator Roddy McDowall. In this adaptation he is a robust white tiger.
- In the 1989 Japanese anime television series Jungle Book Shōnen Mowgli, Shere Khan is voiced by Shigezō Sasaoka in Japanese, Jean Fontaine in the English dub, and Nana Patekar in the Hindi dub. Unlike in the literature, his crippled right leg wasn't a birth defect, but gained in a fight with the wolf Alexander, who was fathering Mowgli. He is very accurate to Kipling's portrayal in a lot of ways (like the fact that he has Tabaqui as a sidekick), only more cruel as he has violated many jungle laws (which includes man-eating) and also shares his Disney version's fear of fire.
- A song titled "Shere Kahn" appears on the 1997 debut album Music for Earthworms by underground rapper Aesop Rock.
- In the Spanish animated television series The Triplets, Shere Khan appears in the episode "The Triplets and The Jungle Book". Unlike other versions, Shere Khan is shown as a good character, acting as Mowgli's protector just as the panther Bagheera and the bear Baloo do in most adaptations. He joins the triplets in finding Mowgli, who has been kidnapped by a hunter who is looking for the treasure of Monkey Town.
- In the 2010 Indian animated television series The Jungle Book, Shere Khan is voiced by David Holt in Seasons 1 and 2 and Marc Thompson in Season 3.
