= Mowgli's Brothers =

1894 short story by Rudyard Kipling

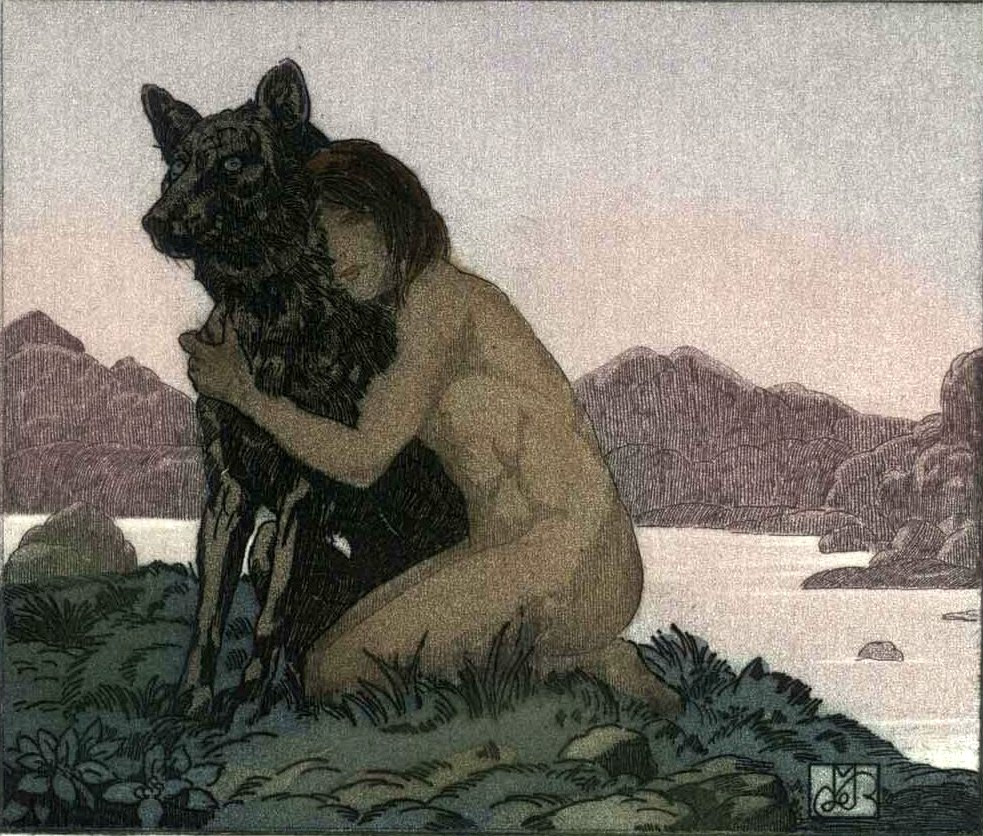
Mowgli and Grey Brother photo illustration from "Mowgli's Brothers" by Maurice de Becque

"Mowgli's Brothers" is a short story by Rudyard Kipling. Chronologically, it is the first story about Mowgli although it was written after "In the Rukh", in which Mowgli appears as an old man.

The story first appeared in the January 1894 issue of St. Nicholas Magazine and was collected as the first story in The Jungle Book later in 1894 where it is accompanied by the poem "Hunting Song of the Seeonee Pack". The story also appears in All the Mowgli Stories. In 1992 it was published as a separate volume with woodcut illustrations by Christopher Wormell. The text is available on-line from several sources as part of The Jungle Book.

The story was adapted as a 25-minute animated television cartoon by Chuck Jones in 1976. Jones also directed adaptations of "Rikki-Tikki-Tavi" and "The White Seal".

== Plot summary ==
Father Wolf and Mother Wolf, Raksha, a pair of wolves raising a family of cubs, are furious to learn from Tabaqui the jackal that Shere Khan the lame tiger is hunting in their territory because he might kill men and bring human retribution upon the jungle. When Father Wolf hears something approaching their den, it turns out to be not the tiger, but a naked human baby boy. Raksha decides to adopt the hairless "man-cub". Her determination is only strengthened by the arrival of Shere Khan, who demands the cub for his meal. The wolves drive off the tiger, and Raksha names him Mowgli, which means frog because of his almost hairless body.

At the wolf pack's meeting at Council Rock, Baloo the bear speaks for the man-cub, and Bagheera the black panther buys his life with a freshly killed bull. Baloo and Bagheera undertake the task of educating Mowgli as he grows. Meanwhile, Shere Khan plans to take revenge on the wolf pack by persuading the younger wolves to depose their leader Akela.

When Mowgli is about 11 years old, Bagheera tells him of Shere Khan's plan. Mowgli, being human, is the only creature in the jungle that does not fear fire, so he steals a pot of burning coals from a nearby village in order to use it against Shere Khan.

The young wolves prevent Akela from catching his prey, and at that night's meeting, Shere Khan demands that the man-cub given to him. Mowgli, despite being naked and unprotected, relentlessly attacks Shere Khan with a burning branch and drives him and his allies away, but realizes to his sorrow that he must now leave the pack and return to humanity. As he leaves, he vows to return one day and lay Shere Khan's hide upon the Council Rock.

== Animated special ==
In 1976 Mowgli's Brothers was adapted and directed as a half-hour television animated special of the same name by veteran animator Chuck Jones, with narration and voices by Roddy McDowall, and June Foray as Mother Wolf. Though largely a faithful adaptation of the story, there are some notable changes in Jones's version. Differences include expanded roles for Baloo and Tabaqui, and that Shere Khan is a white tiger and there is no reference to his lame leg. Jones also directed adaptations of "Rikki-Tikki-Tavi" and "The White Seal".

== In popular culture ==
- The Peter Weir film Gallipoli (1981) features a reading from this story. Bill Kerr's character, Jack, is reading it to some children while Mark Lee's character, Archie, listens in. It foreshadows that Archie will march away to war by the end of the film and become a man.
- Rafael Jaime Zorrilla's live-action Mexican independent short film Mi Hermano Lobo (My Brother Wolf) (2024) features a reading of the poignant scene in which Mowgli bids farewell to Bagheera, Akela, Father Wolf, Raksha and their cubs before departing towards the human village at sunrise. Gabriel (Sebastián Eduardo Pineda Ramírez) the counselor at Camp Rainbow reads it as a bedtime story for Rafael (Jorge Luis Jiménez Avilés) and five other child campers. Unbeknownst to Gabriel, this reading also makes it possible for Mowgli (Héctor Mateo García Díaz Infante) himself to assume temporary physical form in the real world the following morning through literary magic reminiscent of Cornelia Funke's Inkheart.
