= Jaghdar-e Pain =

Jaghdar-e Pain جغدرپائين
- Village
- Location within Iran
- Coordinates: 27°52′29″N 56°39′38″E
- Country: Iran
- Province: Hormozgan
- County: Bandar Abbas
- Bakhsh: Fin
- Rural District: Siyahu

Population (2006)
  - Total: 62
- Time zone: UTC+3:30 (IRST)
  - Summer (DST): UTC+4:30 (IRDT)

Jaghdar-e Pain (Persian: جغدرپائين, also Romanized as Jaghdar-e Pā’īn) is a village in Siyahu Rural District, Fin District, Bandar Abbas County, Hormozgan Province, Iran. At the 2006 census, its population was 62, in 19 families.
