= The Second Jungle Book =

1895 children's book by Rudyard Kipling

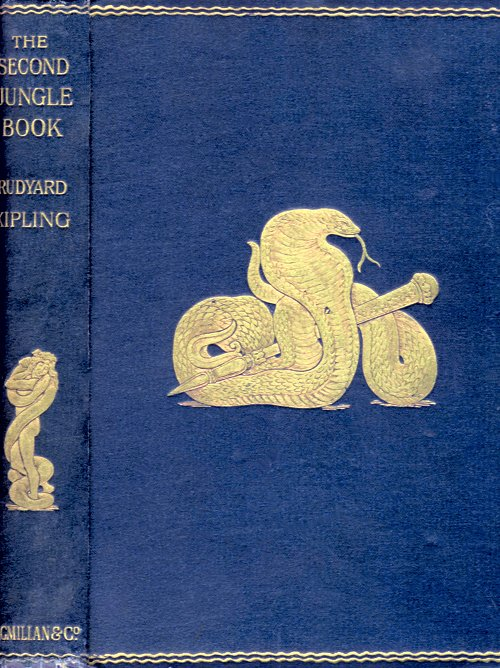
- Gilt-stamped cover from the original edition of The Second Jungle Book, based on interior illustrations by John Lockwood Kipling. The front cover depicts the white cobra from "The King's Ankus"; the spine art shows Mowgli and Kaa wrestling from the same story.
- Author: Rudyard Kipling
- Illustrator: John Lockwood Kipling (Rudyard's father)
- Language: English
- Series: The Jungle Book
- Genre: Children's book
- Publisher: Macmillan Publishers
- Publication date: November 1895
- Publication place: United Kingdom
- Media type: Print (hardback & paperback)
- Preceded by: The Jungle Book

The Second Jungle Book is a sequel to The Jungle Book by Rudyard Kipling. First published in 1895, it features five stories about Mowgli and three unrelated stories, all but one set in India, most of which Kipling wrote while living in Vermont.

All of the stories were previously published in magazines in 1894–5, often under different titles. The 1994 film The Jungle Book used it as a source.

== Contents ==
Each story is followed by a related poem:

1. "How Fear Came": This story takes place before Mowgli fights Shere Khan. During a drought, Mowgli and the animals gather at a shrunken Wainganga River for a "Water Truce" where the display of the blue-colored Peace Rock prevents anyone from hunting at its riverbanks. After Shere Khan was driven away by him for nearly defiling the Peace Rock, Hathi the elephant tells Mowgli the story of how the first tiger got his stripes when fear first came to the jungle. This story can be seen as a forerunner of the Just So Stories.
2. "The Law of the Jungle" (poem)
3. "The Miracle of Purun Bhagat": An influential Indian politician abandons his worldly goods to become an ascetic holy man. Later, he must save a village from a landslide with the help of the local animals whom he has befriended.
4. "A Song of Kabir" (poem)
5. "Letting in the Jungle": Mowgli has been driven out of the human village for witchcraft, and the superstitious villagers are preparing to kill his adopted parents Messua and her unnamed husband. Mowgli rescues them and then prepares to take revenge.
6. "Mowgli's Song Against People" (poem)
7. "The Undertakers": A mugger crocodile, an Indian jackal and a greater adjutant, three of the most unpleasant characters on the river, spend an afternoon bickering with each other until some Englishmen arrive to settle some unfinished business with the crocodile.
8. "A Ripple Song" (poem)
9. "The King's Ankus": Mowgli discovers a jewelled object beneath the Cold Lairs, which he later discards carelessly, not realising that men will kill each other to possess it. Note: The first edition of The Second Jungle Book inadvertently omits the final 500 words of this story, in which Mowgli returns the treasure to its hiding-place to prevent further killings. Although the error was corrected in later printings, it was picked up by some later editions.
10. "The Song of the Little Hunter" (poem)
11. "Quiquern": A teenaged Inuk boy and girl set out across the arctic ice on a desperate hunt for food to save their tribe from starvation, guided by the mysterious animal-spirit Quiquern. However, Quiquern is not what he seems.
12. "Angutivaun Taina" (poem)
13. "Red Dog": Mowgli's wolfpack is threatened by a pack of rampaging dholes. Mowgli asks Kaa the python to help him formulate a plan to defeat them.
14. "Chil's Song" (poem)
15. "The Spring Running": Mowgli, now almost seventeen years old, is growing restless for reasons he cannot understand. On an aimless run through the jungle he stumbles across the village where his adopted mother Messua is now living with her two-year-old son, and is torn between staying with her and returning to the jungle.
16. "The Outsong" (poem)

== Characters ==
- Mowgli – a young human boy of Indian ancestry who has been raised by wolves since infancy.
- Father Wolf – an Indian wolf who is Raksha's mate.
- Raksha – an Indian wolf
- Mang – a bat
- Bagheera – a black panther
- Baloo – a bear
- Kaa – an Indian python
- Tabaqui – a golden jackal
- Akela – an Indian wolf
- Jacala – a mugger crocodile
- The Red Dogs – dholes
- Ikki – an Indian crested porcupine
- Hathi – an Indian elephant
- Grey Brother – one of Mother and Father Wolf's cubs.
- Ko – a carrion crow

== Derivative sequels ==
- The Third Jungle Book, 1992 book by Pamela Jekel, consisting of new Mowgli stories, in an imitation of Kipling's style.
- The Second Jungle Book: Mowgli & Baloo, 1997 film starring Jamie Williams as Mowgli, but the film's story has little or no connection with the stories in Rudyard Kipling's The Second Jungle Book.

== See also ==
- Works of Rudyard Kipling
- Feral children in mythology and fiction
