= Red Dog (Kipling short story) =

1895 short story by Rudyard Kipling

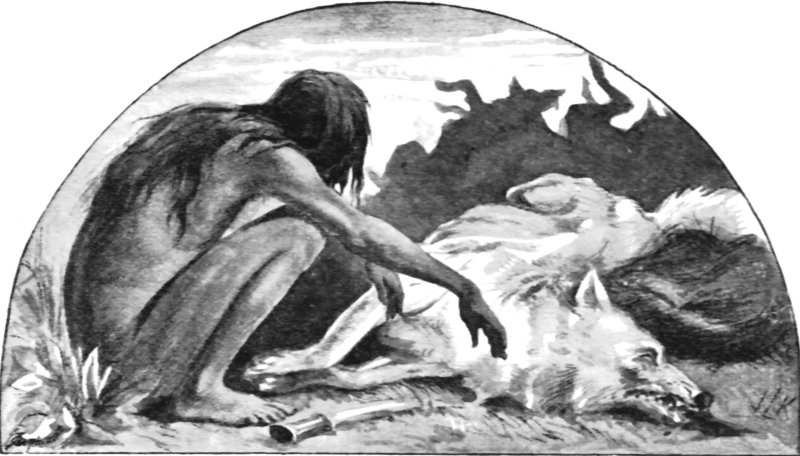
Mowgli mourns Akela: illustration from "Red Dog" by John Lockwood Kipling, father of the author.

"Red Dog" is a Mowgli story by Rudyard Kipling.

Written at Kipling's home in Brattleboro, Vermont between February and March 1895, it was first published as "Good Hunting: A Story of the Jungle" in The Pall Mall Gazette for July 29 and 30 1895 and McClure's Magazine for August 1895 before appearing under its definitive title as the 7th and penultimate story in The Second Jungle Book later the same year. It was also the penultimate Mowgli story to be written.

== Story ==
Mowgli the feral child is about 16 years old and living contentedly with his wolves in the Seeonee jungle, when the peace is disturbed by 'Won-tolla', a solitary wolf whose mate and cubs have been killed by dholes. He warns the Seeonee wolves that the dhole-pack will soon overrun their territory. Later that night, Mowgli meets Kaa, the huge old python, and tells him the news. Kaa does not believe that Mowgli and the pack will survive a direct attack by the dholes, and enters a trance to search his century-long memory for an effective strategy. When he awakens, Kaa takes Mowgli to the Bee Rocks: a gorge where huge hives produced by millions of wild giant honey bees overhang the river, and Mowgli and Kaa devise a plan to lure the dholes to the gorge so that the bees will attack them. Mowgli therefore lies in wait for the dholes in a tree-branch and smears himself with garlic to repel the bees. When the dholes arrive, he taunts their leader into a furious rage and cuts off the leader's tail, before fleeing to the gorge. Just before leaping into the water, Mowgli kicks piles of stones into the beehives, to arouse the bees. The garlic prevents the bees from attacking Mowgli, and he dives safely into the river where Kaa swiftly coils around his body to prevent the current from sweeping him away. Some of the dholes are stung to death by the enraged bees, while others drown in the torrent. The rest flee downstream, pursued by Mowgli. Eventually Mowgli and the surviving dholes reach shallower water, where Mowgli and the wolves fight a ferocious and bloody battle with the remaining dholes, and Won-tolla kills the dhole leader before dying of his own wounds. As the battle comes to its end, Mowgli finds Akela, mortally wounded. With his dying breath, he tells Mowgli that he must soon return to the human race. When Mowgli asks who will drive him there, Akela replies: "Mowgli will drive Mowgli. Go back to thy people. Go to Man". The result thereof is told in "The Spring Running".

== In other media ==
- In the Disney show Jungle Cubs (a prequel to the Disney's The Jungle Book film), a two-part episode featured the Cubs driving the Red Dogs out of the jungle by themselves when the pack returns to the jungle (Bagheera noting that the dogs nearly destroyed the jungle the last time they came). When the dogs attempt to attack Khan in the ancient ruins (where the Cubs hung out), Bagheera, Kaa, Hathi and Louie lure the red dogs into a chase through insults which wound their leader's ego, each one hiding after a certain distance to allow another to take over, culminating in Baloo tricking the red dogs into falling into a gorge filled with bees before they are carried away by the current.
- In the fourth episode of the Russian film-series Adventures of Mowgli, the story is played out according to the book, except Shere Khan and Tabaqui are also present in the story, and choose to leave and wait out the invasion (a scene which became memetic in Russia).
- In the anime series Jungle Book Shōnen Mowgli, two episodes portray the story, but leaves out Akela taking part (and dying) of the war.
- In season 5 of the children's TV show Wild Kratts, Martin is reading the story, which inspires him and Chris to search for the elusive red dogs to see if the real dhole truly is as fearsome as in the story.
- In the comic book Red Dog #1 adapted by P. Craig Russell the story is close to the original.
