= Jaghdar-e Bala =

Jaghdar-e Bala جغدربالا
- Village
- Location within Iran
- Coordinates: 27°51′39″N 56°37′13″E
- Country: Iran
- Province: Hormozgan
- County: Bandar Abbas
- Bakhsh: Fin
- Rural District: Siyahu

Population (2006)
  - Total: 1,000
- Time zone: UTC+3:30 (IRST)
  - Summer (DST): UTC+4:30 (IRDT)

Jaghdar-e Bala (Persian: جغدربالا, also Romanized as Jaghdar-e Bālā; also known as Chīl and Jaghdar-e Kūchek) is a village in Siyahu Rural District, Fin District, Bandar Abbas County, Hormozgan Province, Iran. At the 2006 census, its population was 329, in 90 families. The village includes the upper and lower Jaghdar and due to the presence of high mountains, it has an air pressure that sometimes makes the winds refreshing.

The village is located on the Siahoo asphalt road to the Ahmadi section and currently has a health house, telecommunications, electricity, piped drinking water, and primary and secondary schools.

This village is located in Siahoo village and according to the census of the Statistics Center of Iran in 1390, its population was 1000 people (300 families).  This village is one of the most beautiful villages in Hormozgan province
