= Law of the jungle =

Expression for behavior without rule of law

"The law of the jungle" (also called jungle law) is an expression that has come to describe a scenario where "anything goes". The Oxford English Dictionary defines the Law of the Jungle as "the code of survival in jungle life, now usually with reference to the superiority of brute force or self-interest in the struggle for survival".

The phrase was introduced in Rudyard Kipling's 1894 work The Jungle Book, where it described the self-supportive behaviour of wolves in a pack.

== The Jungle Book ==
In his 1894 novel The Jungle Book, Rudyard Kipling uses the term to describe an actual set of legal codes used by wolves and other animals in the jungles of India. Chapter Two of The Second Jungle Book (1895) includes a poem explaining the Law of the Jungle, as known to the wolves and taught to their offspring. It begins:

NOW this is the law of the jungle, as old and as true as the sky,
And the wolf that shall keep it may prosper, but the wolf that shall break it must die.

As the creeper that girdles the tree trunk, the law runneth forward and back;
For the strength of the pack is the wolf, and the strength of the wolf is the pack.

Mowgli learns this law from his years of living with wolves, and Baloo, the bear character, is a "revered teacher of the Law of the Jungle". For Mowgli, the law pertains to brotherhood: "I was born in the Jungle. I have obeyed the Law of the Jungle, and there is not one of the pack from whose pads I have not plucked a thorn. Surely they are my brothers." According to Laura Stevenson, the law should be read in a pastoral context, "with its carefully thought out rules of mutual survival; they are thus infinitely more civilized than the greedy, superstitious villagers, who are willing to kill Mowgli". That same law also forbids killing humans, "not out of compassion or sportsmanship", but because killing a human means more humans will come with weapons to kill the animals. The latter aspect is grounds for John McBratney to argue that the law which seems so far removed from "the white man's law" (the British Raj) "is in fact bounded and permeated by the Raj."

In the 2016 Disney remake of their 1967 animated film The Jungle Book, itself based on the novel, the wolves' poem is described by Baloo as a piece of propaganda.

The NC State Wolfpack Football Team uses a recording of the poem in the beginning of their home football games.

== See also ==
- Lord of the Flies
- Might makes right
- Natural law
- Social Darwinism
- Survival of the fittest
