= Baloo =

- The Jungle Book character
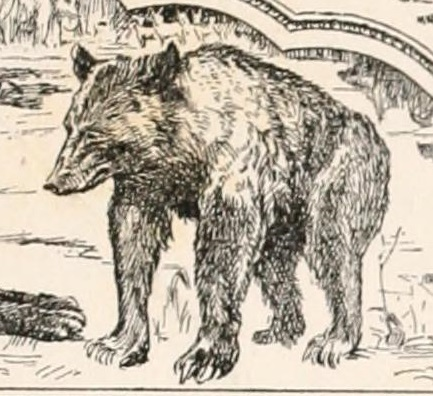
- Baloo in the 1895 edition of The Second Jungle Book
- First appearance: "Mowgli's Brothers"
- Last appearance: The spring Running
- Created by: Rudyard Kipling

In-universe information
- Species: Sloth Bear/Baluchistan Bear (described as a Himalayan brown bear in the book)
- Gender: Male

Baloo (from Hindi: भालू bhālū "bear") is a main fictional character featured in Rudyard Kipling's The Jungle Book from 1894 and The Second Jungle Book from 1895. A sloth bear, he is the strict teacher of the cubs of the Seeonee wolf pack. His most challenging pupil is the "man-cub" Mowgli. He and Bagheera, the panther, save Mowgli from Shere Khan, the tiger, and endeavour to teach Mowgli the Law of the Jungle in many of The Jungle Book stories.

== Name and species ==
He is described in Kipling's work as "the sleepy brown bear". Robert Armitage Sterndale, from whom Kipling derived most of his knowledge of Indian fauna, used the Hindi word "Bhalu" for several bear species, though Daniel Karlin, who edited the Penguin reissue of The Jungle Book in 1987, states that, with the exception of colour, Kipling's descriptions of Baloo are consistent with the sloth bear, as brown and Asian black bears do not occur in the Seoni area where the story takes place. Also, the name sloth can be used in the context of sleepiness. Karlin states, however, that Baloo's diet of "only roots and nuts and honey" is a trait more common to the Asian black bear than to the sloth bear. Nevertheless, this may be single observation only; according to the dietary habits of sloth bears, while sloth bears prefer termites and ants (which is also described as Baloo's special treat in The Jungle Book), their main sources of food are honey and fruits most of the year. In the 1967 Walt Disney's The Jungle Book, he's portrayed as a sloth bear, while in the Russian version, he's portrayed as an Asian black bear. In the 1994 remake of The Jungle Book, Baloo is depicted as a cinnamon bear, while live-action television shows and films often have Baloo as an American black bear. In the 2016 adaptation, Baloo is stated to be a sloth bear by Bagheera, though his appearance is similar to that of a Himalayan brown bear. Though this subspecies of the brown bear is absent from historical records on Seoni, it might have ranged across most of northern India.

Another possibility is that this character was named after Balochistan Bear, a sub-species of Asiatic black bear, which can be found around Baluchistan mountain range of Pakistan and India. Another strong supporting fact to this theory is that Balochistan bears love to eat bananas and other fruits. In several scenes of the Jungle Book, Baloo is shown to be eating bananas and prickly pears.

== Pronunciation ==
In the Author's Notes in the Jungle Books, Kipling gives the pronunciation of the name as /ˈbɑːluː/ BAH-loo; although it is also commonly pronounced /bəˈluː/.

== In film, television, and theatre ==
=== Disney versions ===
Baloo
- Baloo as he appears in Walt Disney's The Jungle Book (1967).
- First appearance: The Jungle Book (1967)
- Created by: Walt Disney
- Voiced by: Phil Harris (The Jungle Book); Ed Gilbert (1990–1999; TaleSpin); Pamela Adlon (as a cub) and Ed Gilbert (as an adult) (Jungle Cubs); Brian-Doyle Murray (The Jungle Book: Mowgli's Story); John Goodman (The Jungle Book 2); Steven Curtis Chapman (The Jungle Book Groove Party, Chip 'n Dale: Rescue Rangers); Kevin Carolan (The Jungle Book Musical); Joel McCrary (2002–present); Bill Murray (2016 adaptation); Jim Cummings (Once Upon a Studio)

In-universe information
- Full name: Baloo von Bruinwald XIII (TaleSpin incarnation)

Baloo, based on Kipling's creation, has appeared in various Disney productions, starting with the company's 1967 feature-length animated film adaptation of The Jungle Book. In this version, Baloo (voiced by Phil Harris) is portrayed as a friendly, even-tempered character who lives a responsibility-free lifestyle, seemingly far removed from the law teacher in Kipling's book. Like in the novel, Baloo is one of Mowgli's mentors and friends. Baloo is also patient and strong; his only apparent weakness is that he's ticklish. Baloo is initially opposed to bringing Mowgli to the Man Village, wanting to raise him as a son. However, when Bagheera explains that Mowgli is easy prey for Shere Khan the tiger and that he's not safe in the jungle, even with Baloo's diligent protection, Baloo realizes he has a point and agrees to tell Mowgli the difficult truth. Mowgli turns on Baloo and runs away, prompting him and Bagheera to split up and search for the boy. Baloo isn't seen again until the climax of the film, when he sees Mowgli preparing to battle Shere Khan. Baloo attempts to stop the tiger, but almost gets killed in the process. After Mowgli follows a girl into the village and decides to stay there, Baloo is slightly disappointed, but is ultimately relieved that Mowgli is safe at last. He and Bagheera then return to the jungle as they sing a reprise of "The Bare Necessities" together.

Baloo returns in the 2003 animated sequel The Jungle Book 2 in which he is voiced by John Goodman. He is eager to reunite with Mowgli, in spite of Bagheera's exasperation and the return of a vindictive Shere Khan, humiliated by his previous defeat at Mowgli's hands. He sneaks into the Man Village at night after eluding Bagheera and Colonel Hathi's herd to visit Mowgli and takes him off into the jungle after being caught by the village girl, now given the name Shanti, who felt bad for getting Mowgli in trouble and unknowingly saves him from Shere Khan, who also came to the village. This leads Shanti, Ranjan, and some of the other villagers to go into the jungle to search for him. Mowgli tells Baloo all about the negative aspects of the village while hiding the positive feelings he also has about the place. When Baloo makes fun of Mowgli's life in the village and scares Shanti like Mowgli asked him to, he unintentionally hurts Mowgli's feelings and annoys him. Baloo and Shanti continue to hate each other until they both say they're trying to save Mowgli from Shere Khan (who ambushed Mowgli when he went after Shanti and Ranjan to apologize) during an argument. From then on, they acknowledge one another as friends. After he, Mowgli, and Shanti trap Shere Khan under a statue on a rocky outcrop in a lava lake, Baloo understands that Mowgli's place is in the village and sadly says good-bye to him. However, it is revealed the next day that Mowgli, Shanti, and Ranjan have the village leader's permission to visit the jungle as they please (presumably because, with Shere Khan gone, the jungle is now "certified as safe"). The film ends with Baloo, Shanti, and Mowgli singing a reprise of "The Bare Necessities" while Ranjan plays with Bagheera.

Baloo became a popular character after the success of the Disney films. He was made famous by the song "The Bare Necessities", sung by Phil Harris, in which he tells Mowgli how to live off the land and still have a life of luxury.

In a 1978 live-action sketch titled The Wonderful World of Ernie from Morecambe and Wise, which parodied "I Wan'na Be Like You (The Monkey Song)", Baloo is played by Eric Morecambe using a full costume, although lip-synching to Phil Harris's original recording.

==== TaleSpin (1990–1991) ====
In the 1990 Disney animated TV series TaleSpin, Baloo (voiced by Ed Gilbert) is the main character of the series and is based primarily on the character from Disney's The Jungle Book, but he wears a flight cap and a khaki shirt. He's also more humanoid in appearance as he has four-fingered hands as opposed to his Jungle Book rendition's claws. He has an easy-going and cheeky personality just like the Jungle Book version. Although juvenile, scruffy, directionless, and a slacker, he is also an excellent pilot and capable of dangerous aerial maneuvers. He flies a cargo plane called the Sea Duck. He will also bravely come to the aid of people in need of help. Some of his mannerisms survive from The Jungle Book, including his nickname of "Papa Bear", and he also calls his young sidekick, Kit Cloudkicker "Little Britches" much like he did to Mowgli.

==== 1994 live-action film ====
In the 1994 Disney live-action film version of The Jungle Book, Baloo, like all the other animals featured, does not speak. He is portrayed by an American black bear named Casey. He first meets Mowgli as a cub when Mowgli finds him trapped inside a broken log. Mowgli frees him and they become fast friends. In a later scene, while Mowgli is escorting his childhood sweetheart Katherine "Kitty" Brydon through the jungle, Baloo appears and playfully wrestles with Mowgli, in the process temporarily scaring Kitty until Mowgli introduces his jungle friends to her. In a later tussle against soldiers working for Captain William Boone, Baloo is shot and left for dead, but Mowgli finds him and locates Dr. Julius Plumford to save his life. In the final scene, after Boone's defeat, Dr. Plumford is shown to have successfully saved Baloo and is seen standing with Baloo beside a waterfall.

==== Jungle Cubs (1996–1998) ====
In the 1996 Disney animated TV series Jungle Cubs, Baloo (voiced by Pamela Adlon) is a kind-hearted and genial cub. He likes to play with his friends (including his best friend Louie) and sometimes plays tricks on Bagheera in order to snap the latter out of his serious attitude. Ed Gilbert voices the character as an adult on three animated segments featured on the VHS releases of the series.

==== The Jungle Book: Mowgli's Story (1998) ====
Baloo appears in the 1998 live-action film The Jungle Book: Mowgli's Story, voiced by Brian-Doyle Murray. His role in the film is similar to the 1967 animated version, but like the original novel, he also becomes Mowgli's teacher (alongside Bagheera) in which he teaches him how to hunt in the jungle and defend against Shere Khan.

==== Stage adaptation (2013) ====
Disney's 2013 stage adaptation of The Jungle Book, directed by Mary Zimmerman, features Kevin Carolan as Baloo.

==== The Jungle Book (2016) ====
In the 2016 version of The Jungle Book, Baloo is voiced by Bill Murray, and appears as a Himalayan brown bear, although Bagheera refers to him as a sloth bear. Baloo claims to hibernate, which would suggest a brown bear, but Bagheera gets him to admit that he just "naps a lot".

Baloo first appears when Kaa is about to devour Mowgli and rescues him from the python before she can eat him. Baloo then takes Mowgli back to his cave and tells him to help him gather honey in exchange for saving his life. Eventually, Baloo and Mowgli form a strong attachment with Mowgli deciding that he wants to stay with Baloo until the winter season arrives. When Bagheera shows up, Mowgli reveals that he wants to live with Baloo. Baloo then speaks with Bagheera, and Baloo reluctantly agrees to send Mowgli away to the Man-village so he is safe from Shere Khan. To this end, he says he and Mowgli were never friends, hoping his lie will coerce Mowgli into going to the Man-village. However, before Mowgli can decide, monkeys under the command of King Louie, a gigantopithecus, abduct him. Baloo and Bagheera track the monkeys back to their temple and fight them off long enough for Mowgli to hide from Louie. The ensuing chase results in Louie's apparent death. When Mowgli learns of Akela's death by Shere Khan from Louie, he angrily decides to face Shere Khan, and steals a torch from the man-village, accidentally starting a fire in the jungle. Baloo and Bagheera follow him in close pursuit and help to distract Shere Khan alongside Raksha and the rest of Mowgli's wolf pack so that Mowgli can set a trap that later kills Shere Khan. After Shere Khan is defeated and the fire extinguished, Mowgli is last seen sometime later with Baloo and Bagheera, having at last found his true home in the jungle.

==== Chip 'n Dale: Rescue Rangers ====
Baloo makes a cameo appearance in the 2022 film Chip 'n Dale: Rescue Rangers, where he was voiced by Steven Curtis Chapman. In the film, it was stated that he was originally from TaleSpin before appearing in The Jungle Book reboot.

==== Once Upon a Studio ====
In the 2023 short Once Upon a Studio, Baloo is shown with Mowgli singing the verses for the song "When You Wish Upon a Star". In the short he is voiced by Jim Cummings who previously voiced him in an animated non-Disney version of The Jungle Book released by GoodTime Video in 1990.

=== Japanese anime (1989) ===
In 1989 Japanese anime television series Jungle Book Shōnen Mowgli, also based on The Jungle Book, Baloo (voiced by Banjō Ginga in Japanese and A.J. Henderson in the English dub) is more faithfully depicted as a strict teacher of Mowgli, not above getting physical in his displeasure when the boy is being difficult. Like his Disney self, he is a sloth bear by species. In the episode "The Cold Fang", Akela reveals that Baloo lost his mother and sibling to a pack of Dholes, which became the reason for his serious nature.

=== Live action series (1998) ===
In the live-action TV series Mowgli: The New Adventures of the Jungle Book based on the original Jungle Book stories, Baloo is once again given a more sensible personality faithful to that of the books.

=== 2010 animated series (2010–2020) ===
In the Indian animated TV series The Jungle Book, Baloo (voiced by Jimmy Hibbert and David Wills) is once again given a more conservative personality faithful to that of the books. He is also depicted in this series as wearing glasses and, like his Disney self, as a tall and obese himalayan brown bear with a bipedal gait.

=== Mowgli: Legend of the Jungle (2018 film) ===
In the 2018 live-action film Mowgli: Legend of the Jungle, Baloo was voiced and motion-captured by Andy Serkis who also served as the film's director. Like his book counterpart, Baloo serves as Mowgli's primary teacher. Serkis has also described this incarnation of Baloo as almost being akin to a drill sergeant who pushes Mowgli to understand the rules of the jungle. When teaching Mowgli, he often advises him not to interact with the Bandar-log. When Mowgli is attacked near the finish line by Bagheera during the rite of passage, Baloo calls him off before it goes too far. Though Mowgli says that Bagheera cut him off, Baloo advises Mowgli not to let his guard down, meaning he had still failed. After Mowgli leaves upset, Baloo furiously scolds Bagheera for being too aggressive and cutting into the test; Bagheera revealed that he failed Mowgli on purpose so that he would go to the man village to be safe from Shere Khan. Baloo, feeling that Bagheera betrayed Mowgli and caused him to fail in being a teacher to him, gets into a physical altercation with the panther, saying that Bagheera was not the only one to care about Mowgli and showing underneath the gruff exterior, the bear did care. Both stop their fighting however when Bhoot, Mowgli's albino wolf cub friend, informs them that the Bandar-log had made off with Mowgli. The two of them manage to rescue Mowgli from the Bandar-log, Shere Khan, and Tabaqui with the help of Kaa. When Akela orders Mowgli to leave the lair after he used fire to drive off Shere Khan and Tabaqui, Baloo is saddened to see him go. In the climax of the film, Baloo is among the animals that witness Mowgli's duel with Shere Khan outside the man village which ends with the death of Shere Khan.
