= List of The Jungle Book characters =

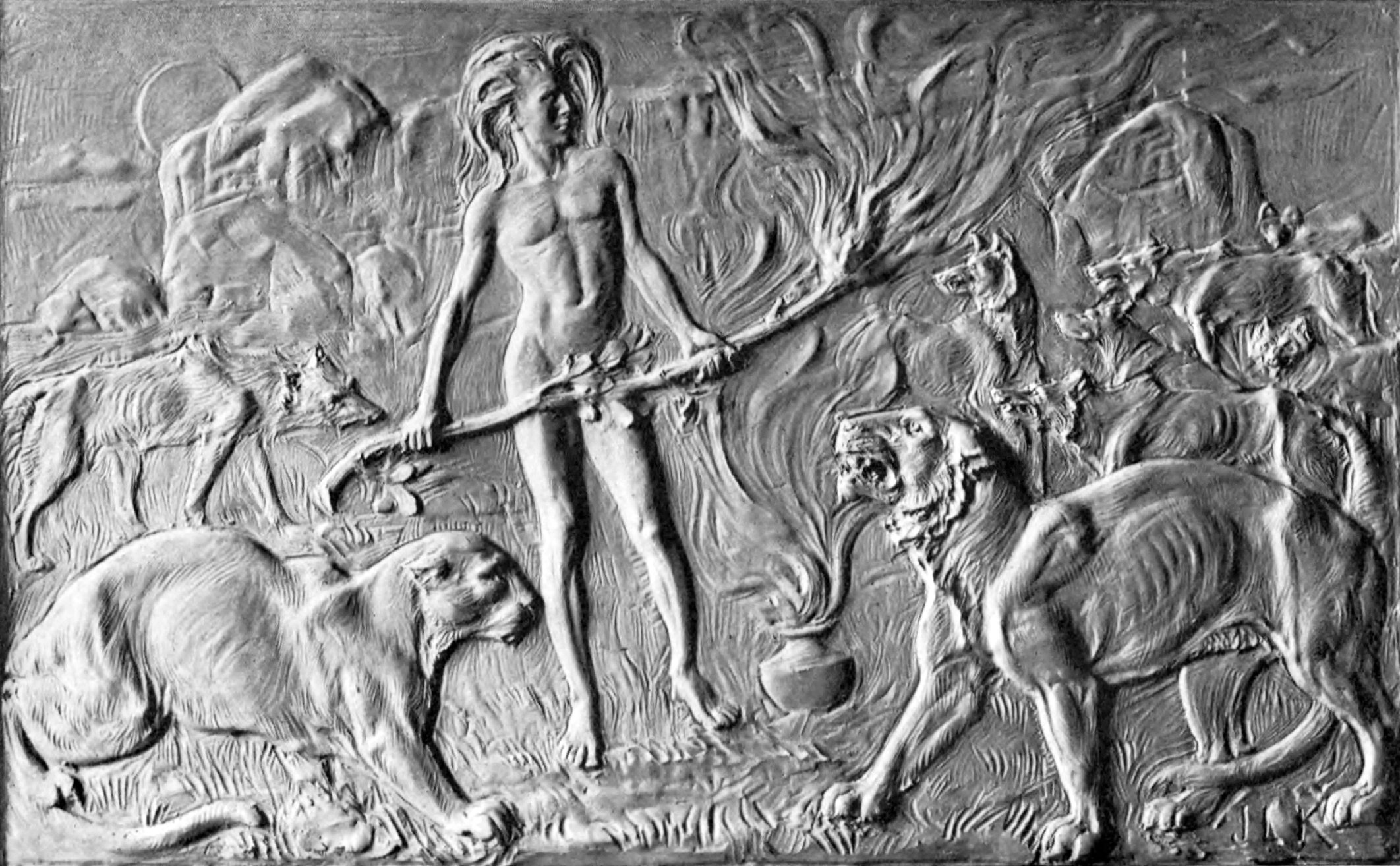
Mowgli attacking Shere Khan: detail from a clay bas-relief by John Lockwood Kipling, father of Rudyard Kipling, from The Works of Rudyard Kipling Vol. VII: The Jungle Book, 1907.

This is a list of characters that appear in Rudyard Kipling's 1894 The Jungle Book story collection, its 1895 sequel The Second Jungle Book, and the various film adaptations based on those books. Characters include both human and talking animal characters.

== In the Mowgli stories ==
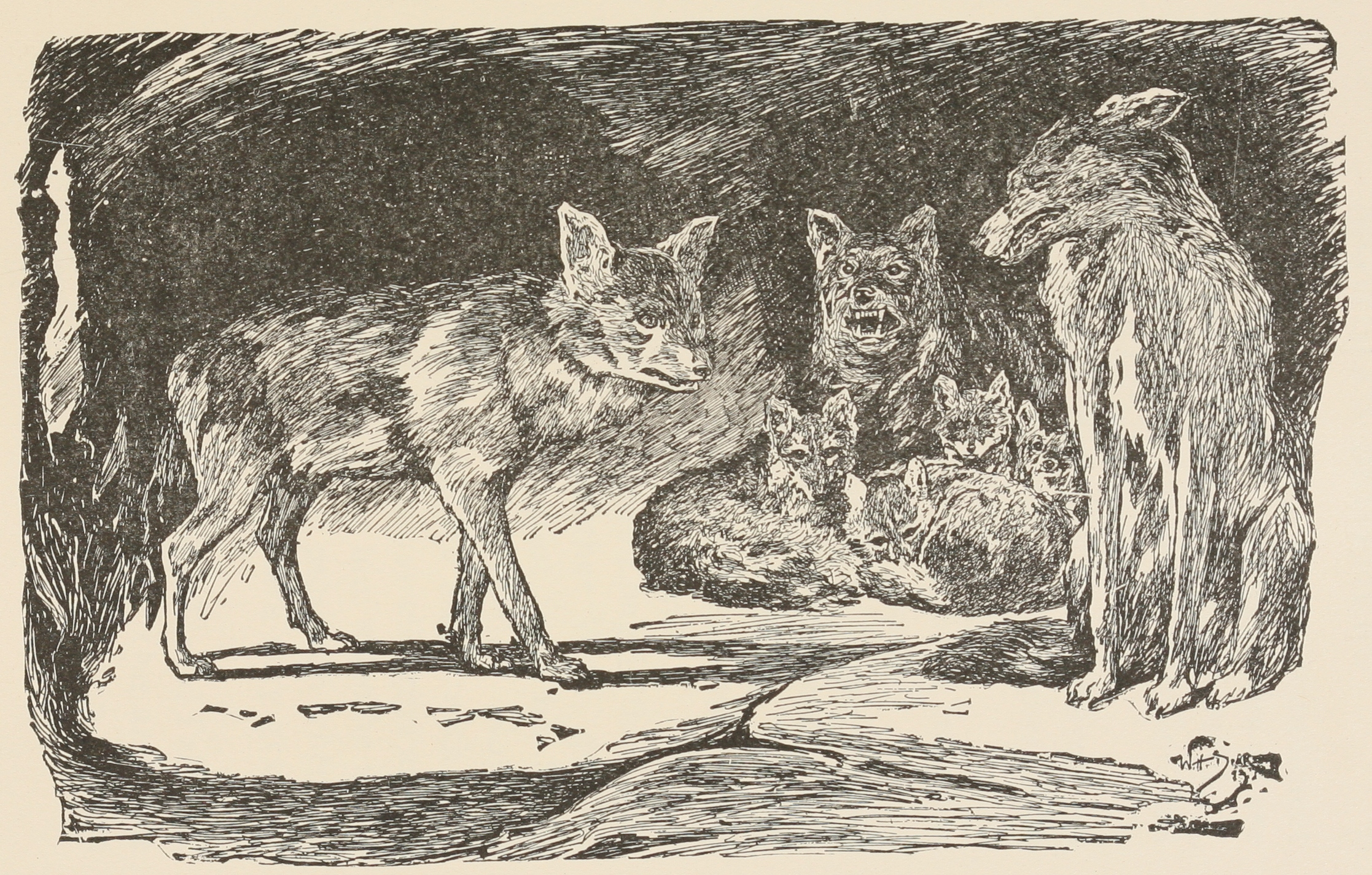
Tabaqui insults the Wolf family by John Charles Dollman, 1903

The letter ṃ (anusvara) in Hindi usually represents a nasal consonant homorganic with the following stop, i.e. ṃb /mb/, ṃt /nt/, ṃk /ŋk/ etc.

- Mowgli (मोगली موگلی Moglī; feral child) – the titular protagonist, also referred to as "Man Cub", he is a boy who was raised by wolves, Bagheera, and Baloo.

=== Animals ===
- Bagheera (बघीरा Baghīrā; بگھیڑا Baghīrā, "black panther"; black panther variety of leopard) – one of Mowgli's mentors and protector.
- Baloo (भालू بھالو Bhālū, "bear"; sloth bear) – one of Mowgli's mentors and his friend. In Kipling's book, he is described as a sleepy old bear who teaches Mowgli the law of the jungle.
- Kaa (का کا Kā Indian rock python) – Mowgli's wise mentor and friend, though also feared throughout the jungle for his mesmerizing "hunger dance".
- Hathi (हाथी ہاتھی Hāthī "Elephant"; Indian elephant) – the chief of the local elephants and keeper of the Jungle Law.
- Shere Khan (शेर खान شیر خان Śēr Khān, "Tiger King" ("Khan" is a common title of Indian Muslim lordship and royalty); Bengal tiger) – a vicious man-eating Bengal Tiger who is the only recurring animal villain and the archenemy of Mowgli. He is often known as "a chief among tigers" and in multiple adaptations as the one called "The King of Tigers". Despite being born with a crippled leg and derisively nicknamed "Lungri" ("The Lame One") by his own mother, Shere Khan is ruthless, aggressive, violent, arrogant, self-centered, and sees himself as the rightful lord of the jungle.
- Seeonee Wolf Pack – an Indian wolf pack that Mowgli was raised by.
  - Akela (अकेला اکیلا Akēlā, "alone"; Indian wolf) – the chief and leader of the wolf pack.
  - Raksha (रक्षा رکشا Rakṣā, "protection"; Indian wolf) – also called Mother Wolf, she is Mowgli's adoptive mother.
  - Moti (मोती موتی moe-tee, "pearl"; Indian wolf) – also called Father Wolf, he is Mowgli's adoptive father. In the animated Disney film adaptation, he is named Rama. In the 2018 adaptation, he is named Vihaan, and in the 1989 anime adaptation, he is named Alexander.
  - Grey Brother (Indian wolf) – the oldest of Father Wolf and Raksha's cubs. He appears on all Disney adaptations except for 1967's The Jungle Book, 1998's The Jungle Book: Mowgli's Story, and 2003's The Jungle Book 2. In the 1989 anime adaptation, Mowgli has two wolf brothers named Akru and Sura.
  - Leela (लीला لیلا Līlā; Indian wolf) – the granddaughter of Akela.
- Bandar-log (बन्दर-लोग بندر لوگ Bandar-lōg, "monkey-folks"; grey langurs) – a society of monkeys who are treated as pariahs for their scatterbrained anarchy. They kidnap the very young Mowgli, who is rescued by Bagheera, Baloo, and Kaa.
- Gajjini (गजिनी گجنی, "Elephant"; Indian elephant) – Hathi's wife. She is named Winifred in the animated Disney film adaptation.
- Hathi Jr. (छोटा हाथी چھوٹا ہاتھی, "Elephant"; Indian elephant) – Hathi's son and Mowgli's friend.
- Tabaqui (तंबाकूवी تنباکوی Taṃbākūvī; "Dish-Licking Dog"; golden jackal) – he feeds on scraps from either Shere Khan or the wolves of the Seeonee Pack. In some adaptations, he is a striped hyena. Tabaqui is a servant of Shere Khan as well as Shere Khan's spy and messenger. He is killed by Grey Brother after the Grey Brother interrogates him into admitting both what Shere Khan plans to do and where and then crushes the jackal's back in "Tiger! Tiger!". He is absent from all the Disney adaptations of The Jungle Book except the 1994 live action remake, in which he is a human who works for Boone and 1998's The Jungle Book: Mowgli's Story, in which he is portrayed as a spotted hyena, a species only native to Africa in real life.
- Mang (मङग منگ Maṅg, "go"; bat) – a bat.
- Rama (रमा رما Ramā; water buffalo) – a large water buffalo that Mowgli herds when living with humans and rides upon during the final confrontation with Shere Khan.
- Mysa (मौसा موسا Maisā, "uncle"; water buffalo) – a water buffalo.
- Chil (चील چیل Cīl; "kite (bird)"), in earlier editions called Rann (रण Raṇ, "battle") – a kite that serves as a messenger. He is depicted as a Brahminy kite in the 1989 anime series.
- Sahi (इकी اکی Ikī; Indian porcupine). In later editions, he was called Ikki.
- Tha (था تھا Thā, "He was"; Indian elephant) – the first of the elephants according to Hathi.
- Thuu (थू تھو Thū; Indian cobra), in The King's Ankus – a male blind albino cobra, also called White Hood. Mowgli gives him the derisory epithet "Thuu" (meaning "it has dried") upon discovering that the supposedly deadly cobra's fangs are in fact withered and dried up from age and disuse. A version of him appeared in the Jungle Cubs episode "The Treasure of Middle Jungle", voiced by Jim Cummings. This version is a giant Indian cobra who guards man's treasure in the Middle Jungle and his fangs drying out remain intact where a shrew exposed that fact to Baloo, Prince Louie, Shere Khan, and Kaa.
- Dholes – a pack of dholes that appear in the story "Red Dog".
- Oo (ऊ او Ū; turtle)
- Jacala (जाचला جاچلا Jacalā, "obstacle"; Indian crocodile) – a large mugger crocodile. In "Red Dog", it is stated that Mowgli broke a knife on Jacala's back during a protracted fight with him.
- Mao (मवा موا Mavā; Indian peacock) – in earlier editions, he was called Mor (मोर مور Mōr, "peacock"). .
- Won-Tolla (Indian wolf) – an outlier who warns Mowgli's tribe of the dholes who killed his mate and cubs. Before dying of his wounds during the fight between the dholes and Mowgli's tribe, Won-Tolla slays the dhole leader.
- Chikai (चीकै جیکے Cīkai, "squeak"; rat)
- Phao (फवा پھوا Phavā; Indian wolf) – son of Phaona and leader of The Free People.
- Phaona (फवाना پھوانا Phavānā; Indian wolf) – Phao's father and member of The Free People.
- Ferao (फोडवा پھوڑوا Phōṛavā, "woodpecker"; scarlet woodpecker)

=== Humans ===
The following characters are known humans;

- Messua – the wife of the richest man of the human village who decides to adopt the wild Mowgli, believing that he is their long-lost son, Nathoo. She and her husband are imprisoned after Mowgli is driven out, as he was accused of sorcery by Buldeo and therefore, are accused of the same themselves for harboring Mowgli. Messua is immensely grateful towards Mowgli when he comes to free them, and together she and her husband flee to the town of Khaniwara, planning to seek counsel of the English authorities for the injustice they had suffered at the hands of the villagers. Mowgli meets her again years later, finding her widowed, with a new son and decides to leave the jungle once more, to live with her.
- Messua's husband – an unnamed man, the richest man of the village. Upon being falsely imprisoned by the villagers, he shows nothing but resentment towards the villagers for taking all of his property and vows to bring severe legal action against the village. When Mowgli finds Messua again after years have passed, he learns that her husband has died and never got satisfaction as the village was gone by the time they had returned with the authorities, having been destroyed by Mowgli and the animals. In the 1989 anime adaptation, he is named Sanjay.
- Nathoo (नत्थू نتھو Natthū) – the long-lost son of Messua and her husband, who has been snatched by a tiger. Although Mowgli is never proven to be him, Messua notes he very much resembles Nathoo and therefore, calls him by her missing son's name and Mowgli answers to the name. In the 1942 film, Mowgli is confirmed to be infant Nathoo, and in the 1989 anime adaptation, Nathoo is renamed Keshnu, but is confirmed not to be Mowgli, while in the 1994 Disney live action film, Nathoo is the name of Mowgli's father.

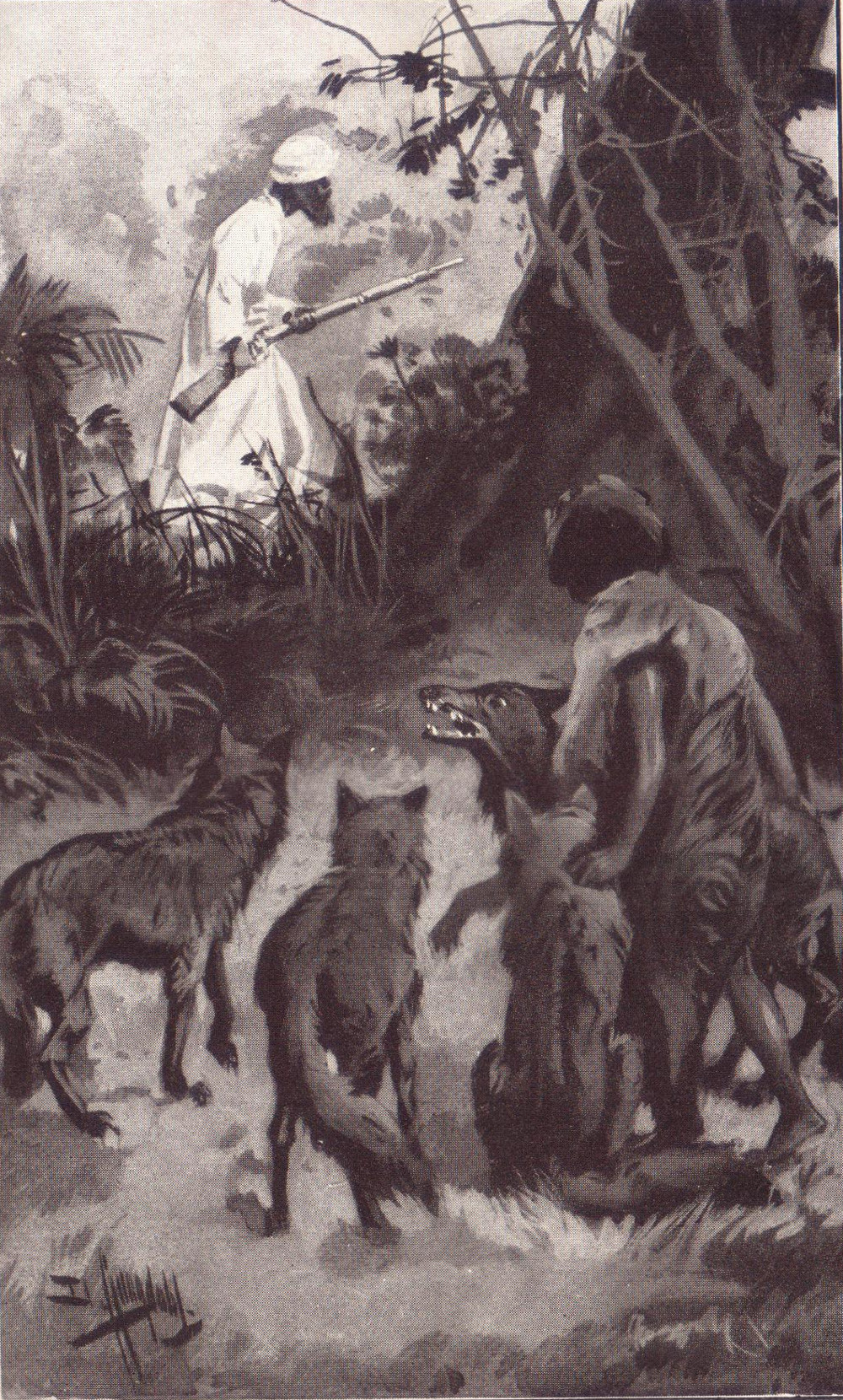
Buldeo, being secretly observed by Mowgli and his wolf brothers, illustrated by David Ljungdahl.

- Buldeo (बलदेव بلدیو Baladēvā) – the elderly chief hunter of Messua's village and only recurring human villain, first appearing in "Tiger! Tiger!". He is boastful, arrogant, greedy and superstitious, and he is furious when Mowgli, who knows what the jungle is really like, contradicts some of his own more fanciful stories about the jungle. He hopes to kill Shere Khan so he can get a substantial reward placed out as a bounty for the tiger's skin, ultimately losing it to Mowgli when Akela drives him away. Frightened by Mowgli's ability to talk to animals and potentially resentful of him taking Shere Khan's hide from him, he returns to the village and accuses Mowgli of being an evil, shape-shifting sorcerer, successfully turning the entire village against the boy and spurring them to drive Mowgli out by throwing stones at him. In the story "Letting in the Jungle", Mowgli finds Buldeo conversing with some charcoal-burners and overhears him explaining that Messua and her husband have been arrested for harboring Mowgli and accused of sorcery themselves and are awaiting Buldeo's return for their execution. Sending his wolf brothers and Bagheera to go and delay Buldeo's return by terrorizing him, Mowgli makes haste to the village and helps Messua and her husband escape, learning from them Buldeo had actually been sent to kill him that morning. Buldeo is last seen finally returning to the village, haggard and thoroughly traumatized, relating his superstitious account to the villagers. He is never seen again, but is mentioned several times and is presumably driven out when the jungle animals, under Mowgli's direction, lay waste to the fields and houses of the village and drive out the populace.
  - In many adaptations such as the 1942 film, 1994 Disney live action film or the deleted draft of the Disney film, he is shown wanting to find the treasure of the Cold Lairs. In the 1989 anime adaptation, he was depicted as a far more malignant character, having considered shipping Mowgli off to the Bombay circus not long after the boy first came to the village, sending his pet cobra after Mowgli in the middle of the night (and scapegoating him with accusations of shape-shifting when Rikki-Tikki killed the cobra to protect Mowgli), and being a ringleader in Messua and Sanjay's arrest, doing so as a cover-up for a conspiracy to steal their land and assets. This version of Buldeo appears last during the jungle's siege on the village, being stopped from shooting Mowgli's animal friends when the boy steals his rifle and smashes it on the ground, sending the wicked old man fleeing for his life. In the 2018 adaptation, he was a British hunter called John Lockwood portrayed by Matthew Rhys (John Lockwood Kipling was Rudyard Kipling's father). Mowgli found that he had killed Bhoot and shot half of 's tusk. During Mowgli's fight with Shere Khan, Lockwood tries to shoot Shere Khan, only for Akela to take the bullet when it was heading towards Mowgli. Lockwood himself was crushed to death by Hathi.
- Mowgli's wife – a woman, whom Mowgli fell in love with, and meets his old friends in the jungle. In the 1994 Disney live action film, she is Kitty Brydon, daughter of Colonel Brydon.
- Mowgli's son – the son of Mowgli and his wife.

== Other stories ==
- Rikki-Tikki-Tavi
  - Rikki-Tikki-Tavi (Indian grey mongoose)
  - Nag and Nagaina (Indian cobras) – Nag?a is the Hindi word for "cobra".
  - Darzee (tailorbird) – Darzee means "tailor" in Hindi.
  - Chuchundra (Asian house shrew, called a muskrat in the story) – his name is derived from "chuchunder", a term used for his species in India.
  - Karait (common krait)
  - The Coppersmith (coppersmith barbet)
- The White Seal
  - Kotick (albino seal) – "Котик" means "seal" in Russian.
  - Sea Catch (adult male northern fur seal); a poem by Rudyard Kipling uses the word in a Russian-type plural form "see-catchie".
  - Matkah (female northern fur seal) - "матка" is Russian seal-hunter's word for "female seal", from Russian "мать" = "mother".
  - Sea Vitch (walrus)
  - Sea Cow (Steller's sea cow)
  - Burgomaster Gull (species) (same as Glaucous gull)
  - Limmershin, the Winter Wren (Note: At the time of the book's publication, the "winter wren" was thought of as the same species as the Eurasian wren; the wren in question here is actually a Pacific wren (Troglodytes pacificus).)
- Toomai of the Elephants
  - Toomai
  - Machua Appa
  - Kala Nag (elephant)
- Her Majesty's Servants
  - Two-Tails (elephant)
  - Billy (battery-mule)
  - Vixen (a small dog)
- The Miracle of Purun Bhagat
  - Purun Bhagat
  - The langurs
  - The Barasingha
  - Sona (Himalayan black bear)
- The Undertakers
  - The Jackal (Golden jackal)
  - The Adjutant (Lesser adjutant stork, erroneously referred to as a crane).
  - Mugger of Mugger-Ghaut (Mugger crocodile)
  - The Gavial (Gharial) – the Mugger's cousin.

== Film and television adaptations ==
- King Louie (Disney) is an Bornean orangutan who leads the Bandar-log. In the 2016 film, he is a Gigantopithecus. He is voiced by Louis Prima in the first film, Jim Cummings in TaleSpin, Jason Marsden in season one of Jungle Cubs, Cree Summer in season two of Jungle Cubs, and Christopher Walken in the 2016 film. He never appears in the second film.
- Flunkey (Disney) is King Louie's monkey servant and lieutenant. He is voiced by Leo De Lyon in the first film and by Jim Cummings in The Jungle Book 2.
- Buzzy, Dizzy, Flaps, and Ziggy (Disney) are four vultures who closely resemble the Beatles because of their shaggy moptop haircuts and Liverpool accents. Buzzy resembles Ringo Starr, Dizzy resembles George Harrison, Flaps resembles Paul McCartney, and Ziggy resembles John Lennon. Their song "That's What Friends Are For" was sung in the style of a barbershop quartet instead of a Beatles song. Disney was originally going to have The Beatles voice them, but John Lennon refused the offer. Buzzy was voiced by J. Pat O'Malley in the first film and by Jeff Bennett in The Jungle Book 2. Dizzy is voiced by Lord Tim Hudson in the first film and by Jess Harnell in The Jungle Book 2. Flaps is voiced by Chad Stuart in the first film and by Brian Cummings in The Jungle Book 2. Ziggy is voiced by Digby Wolfe in the first film and by Jess Harnell in The Jungle Book 2.
- Shanti (Disney, named only in The Jungle Book 2) is a girl whose song "My Own Home" lured Mowgli into the Man Village in the 1967 film. Shanti later serves as his ally/love interest in the sequel. Shanti is voiced by Darleen Carr in the first film and by Mae Whitman in The Jungle Book 2. She is inspired by the unnamed girl that Mowgli falls in love with in the original novels, as well as Mahala from the 1942 adaptation.
- Ranjan (Disney The Jungle Book 2) is Mowgli's adopted younger brother. He is depicted as the son of Messua and her husband. Ranjan is voiced by Connor Funk.
- Lucky (Disney The Jungle Book 2) is the vultures' friend who loves teasing Shere Khan as seen in The Jungle Book 2. He is voiced by Phil Collins.
- Rocky (Disney) is an Indian rhinoceros. In the earlier production of the first film, Rocky was to appear in the same scene as the Vultures where he would've been voiced by Frank Fontaine, but his part got scrapped. Rocky did appear in the 2016 film voiced by Russell Peters where he was among the animals observing the Water Truce. After telling Mowgli to watch himself after being backed into him upon being accidentally pricked by Ikki's quills, Rocky tells Raquel that Mowgli is a man-cub.
- Raquel (Disney 2016 film) is the daughter of Rocky the Rhino. She is voiced by Madeleine Favreau.
- Fred (Disney 2016 film) is a pygmy hog who is one of the neighbors and friends of Baloo. He was voiced by Jon Favreau, who also directed the film.
- Meeko the Giant Squirrel (Disney 2016 film) is an Indian giant squirrel who is one of the neighbors and friends of Baloo. The Giant Squirrel was the one who supported Baloo's claim to Mowgli that the honey works to soothe the bee stings as he claims that it's nature's ointment where he puts it everywhere. He was voiced by Sam Raimi.
- Pangolin (Disney 2016 film) is an Indian pangolin who is one of the neighbors and friends of Baloo. He was voiced by an uncredited Spike Jonze.
- Kichi (anime adaptation) is a Red panda and Mowgli's best friend.
- Ponya (3D adaptation) is a female Red panda who is the friend of Mowgli.
- William Boone (The Jungle Book (1994 film)) is a British Army captain and Mowgli's enemy; was played by Cary Elwes.
- Bhoot (Warner Bros) is an albino wolf cub and Mowgli's friend. The two of them had a falling out when Bagheera made Mowgli fail Baloo's test. Mowgli found that Bhoot was killed by John Lockwood, when he finds his body taxidermied, causing Mowgli to see that John is not a nice person. Bhoot is voiced by Louis Ashbourne Serkis.
