= Mowgli =

Fictional character created by Rudyard Kipling

- The Jungle Book character
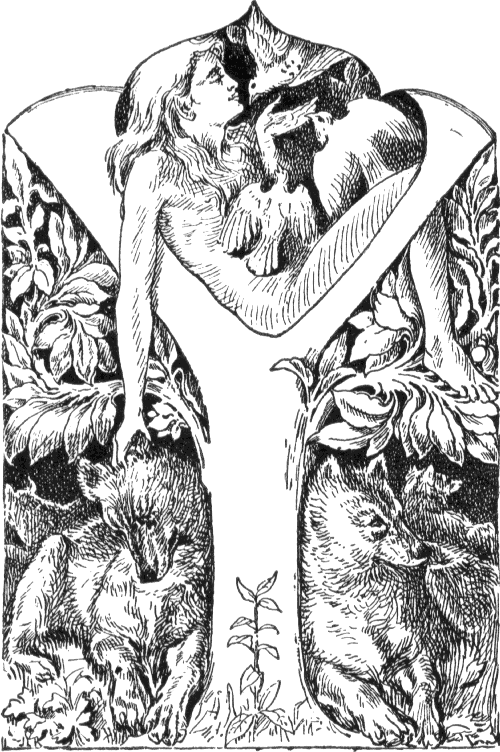
- Mowgli by John Lockwood Kipling (father of Rudyard Kipling); an illustration from The Second Jungle Book (1895)
- First appearance: "In the Rukh" (1893)
- Last appearance: "The Spring Running" (1895)
- Created by: Rudyard Kipling

In-universe information
- Nicknames: Man-cub, Frog
- Family: Raksha (foster mother); Father Wolf (foster father); Messua (foster mother); Messua's husband (foster father)
- Spouse: Unnamed Wife
- Children: Unnamed son
- Nationality: Indian

Mowgli (/ˈmaʊ.ɡli/, MOW-glee) is a fictional character and the protagonist of the Mowgli stories featured among Rudyard Kipling's The Jungle Book stories. He is a feral boy from the Pench area in Seoni, Madhya Pradesh, India, who originally appeared in Kipling's short story "In the Rukh" (collected in Many Inventions, 1893) and then became the most prominent character in the collections The Jungle Book and The Second Jungle Book (1894–1895), which also featured stories about other (on the basis of Marwar king Rao Sihaji) characters.

== Name and inspiration ==
In the stories, the name Mowgli is said to mean "frog", describing his lack of fur. Kipling later said "Mowgli is a name I made up. It does not mean 'frog' in any language that I know of."

Part of Kipling's inspiration for the story of Mowgli is believed to have been William Henry Sleeman's account of six cases in India in which wild children had been raised by wolves. That account was first published in the first volume of Sleeman's Journey Through the Kingdom of Oude in 1848-1850 (1858) and reprinted in 1852 as An Account of Wolves Nurturing Children in Their Dens, by an Indian Official and in The Zoologist (1888 12 (135): 87-98). One most notable feral child was found in the wolf's den at the Bulandshahr district in 1867 and subsequently brought to the Sikandra orphanage at Agra, where he was given the name Dina Sanichar.

== Kipling's Mowgli stories ==
The Mowgli stories, including "In the Rukh", were first collected in chronological order in one volume as The Works of Rudyard Kipling Volume VII: The Jungle Book (1907) (Volume VIII of this series contained the non-Mowgli stories from the Jungle Books), and subsequently in All the Mowgli Stories (1933).

"In the Rukh" describes how Gisborne, an English forest ranger in the Pench area in Seoni at the time of the British Raj, discovers a young man named Mowgli, who has extraordinary skills in hunting, tracking, and driving wild animals (with the help of his wolf brothers). He asks him to join the forestry service. Muller, the head of the Department of Woods and Forests of India as well as Gisborne's boss, meets Mowgli, checks his elbows and knees, noting the callouses and scars, and figures Mowgli is not using magic or demons, having seen a similar case in 30 years of service. Muller also invites Mowgli to join the service, to which Mowgli agrees. Later, Gisborne learns the reason for Mowgli's almost superhuman talents; he was raised by a pack of wolves in the jungle (explaining the scars on his elbows and knees from going on all fours). Mowgli marries the daughter of Gisborne's butler, Abdul Gafur, and conceives a son with her.

Kipling then proceeded to write the stories of Mowgli's childhood in detail in The Jungle Book, which serves as a prequel to In the Rukh. Lost by his parents as a baby in the Indian jungle during a tiger attack, he is adopted by the Wolf Mother, Raksha and Father Wolf, who call him Mowgli (frog) because of his lack of fur and his refusal to sit still. Shere Khan the tiger demands that they give him the baby but the wolves refuse. Mowgli grows up with the pack, hunting with his brother wolves. In the pack, Mowgli has the unique ability to remove the painful thorns from the paws of his brothers. He also learns he has the power to stare down any animal. To make up for his lack of fangs and claws, he wears a neck knife after living in the man village.

Bagheera, the black panther, paid for Mowgli's admission into the pack with a freshly killed bull. He befriends Mowgli because both he and Mowgli have parallel childhood experiences; as Bagheera often mentions, he was "raised in the King's cages at Oodeypore" from a cub, and thus knows the ways of man. Baloo the brown bear, teacher of wolves, has the thankless task of educating Mowgli in "The Law of the Jungle".

Shere Khan continues to regard Mowgli as fair game, but eventually Mowgli finds a weapon he can use against the tiger – fire. After driving off Shere Khan, Mowgli goes to a human village where he is adopted by Messua and her husband, whose own son Nathoo was also taken by a tiger. It is uncertain if Mowgli is actually the returned Nathoo, although it is stated in "Tiger! Tiger!" that the tiger who carried off Messua's son was similar to the one that attacked Mowgli's parents. Messua would like to believe that her son has returned, but she herself realises that this is unlikely.

While herding buffalo for the village, Mowgli learns that the tiger is still planning to kill him, so with the aid of two wolves, he traps Shere Khan in a ravine where the buffalo trample him. The tiger dies and Mowgli sets to skin him. After being accused of witchcraft and cast out of the village, Mowgli returns to the jungle with Shere Khan's hide and reunites with his wolf family, but it is mentioned that he later becomes married and goes back to live among men.

In later stories in The Jungle Book's sequel, The Second Jungle Book, Mowgli learns that the villagers are planning to kill Messua and her husband for harboring him. He rescues them and sends elephants, water buffaloes, and other animals to trample the village and its fields to the ground. Later, Mowgli finds and then discards an ancient treasure ("The King's Ankus"), not realising it is so valuable that men would kill to own it. With the aid of Kaa the python, he leads the wolves in a war against the dhole ("Red Dog").

Finally, Mowgli stumbles across the village where his adopted human mother (Messua) is now living, which forces him to come to terms with his humanity and decide whether to rejoin his fellow humans in "The Spring Running".

== Play adaptations ==
Rudyard Kipling adapted the Mowgli stories for The Jungle Play in 1899, but the play was never produced on stage. The manuscript was lost for almost a century. It was published in book form in 2000.

In 2013 Mowgli was portrayed in Mary Zimmerman's The Jungle Book Musical, played by Akash Chopra.

== Influences upon other works ==
Only six years after the first publication of The Jungle Book, E. Nesbit's The Wouldbegoods (1899) included a passage in which some children act out a scene from the book.

Mowgli has been cited as a major influence on Edgar Rice Burroughs who created and developed the character Tarzan. Mowgli was also an influence for a number of other "wild boy" characters.

Poul Anderson and Gordon R. Dickson used the Mowgli stories as the basis for their humorous 1957 science fiction short story "Full Pack (Hokas Wild)". This is one of a series featuring a teddy bear-like race called Hokas who enjoy human literature but cannot quite grasp the distinction between fact and fiction. In this story, a group of Hokas get hold of a copy of The Jungle Book and begin to act it out, enlisting the help of a human boy to play Mowgli. The boy's mother, who is a little bemused to see teddy bears trying to act like wolves, tags along to try to keep him (and the Hokas) out of trouble. The situation is complicated by the arrival of three alien diplomats who just happen to resemble a monkey, a tiger and a snake. This story appears in the collection Hokas Pokas! (1998) and is also available online.

== Films, television and radio ==
- The 1942 live-action film version starred Sabu as Mowgli.
- Disney's 1967 animated musical film version, where he is voiced by Bruce Reitherman, son of the film's director Wolfgang Reitherman (David Bailey was originally cast in the role, but his voice changed during production, leading Bailey to not fit the "young innocence of Mowgli's character" at which the producers were aiming), and its sequel, The Jungle Book 2 (2003), in which Mowgli is voiced by Haley Joel Osment (Jake Thomas auditioned for the role prior to Osment's casting). On three special animated segments for the VHS releases of the Jungle Cubs (1996-1998) animated TV series, Mowgli is voiced by Tyler Mullen. In the 2023 short Once Upon a Studio Mowgli's singing voice is provided by Phoenix Reisser.
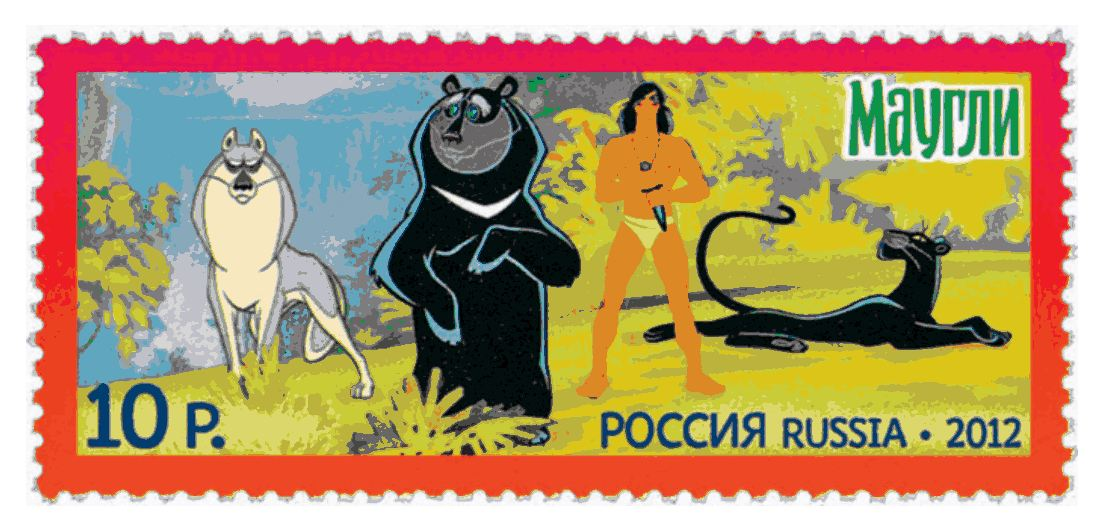
  Heroes of the Soviet animation film on a postal stamp of Russia.
- Around the same time – from 1967 to 1971 – five Russian short animated films were made by Soyuzmultfilm, collectively known as Adventures of Mowgli.
- Of all the various adaptations, Chuck Jones's 1977 animated TV short Mowgli's Brothers, adapting the first story in The Jungle Book, may be the one that adheres most closely to the original plot and dialogue.
- There has also been a 1989 Japanese animated TV series Jungle Book Shonen Mowgli (where Mowgli is voiced by Urara Takano in the Japanese and Julian Bailey in the English Dub) based on the Mowgli series.
- There was also a BBC radio adaptation in 1994, starring actress Nisha K. Nayar as Mowgli, Freddie Jones as Baloo and Eartha Kitt as Kaa. It originally aired on BBC Radio 5 (before it became BBC Radio 5 Live and dropped its children's programming). Subsequently, it has been released on audio cassette and has been re-run a number of times on digital radio channel BBC 7 (now BBC Radio 4 Extra).
- Classics Illustrated #83 (1951) contains an adaptation of three Mowgli stories.
- Between 1953 and 1955 Dell Comics featured adaptations of six Mowgli stories in three issues (#487, #582 and #620).
- Some issues of Marvel Fanfare feature adaptations of the Mowgli stories by Gil Kane. These later were collected as an omnibus volume.
- A 1978 live-action sketch titled The Wonderful World of Ernie from Morecambe and Wise which parodied "I Wan'na Be Like You (The Monkey Song)". Danny Rolnick played Mowgli using a full costume, although lip-synching to Bruce Reitherman's original recorded dialogue in the middle of the song.
- A 1994 live-action adaptation by MDP Worldwide, titled Rudyard Kipling's The Jungle Book, directed by Stephen Sommers, which starred Jason Scott Lee as Mowgli. He was also played by Sean Naegeli as a young child at the beginning of the story.
- P. Craig Russell's Jungle Book Stories (1997) collects three stories, actually adapted from The Second Jungle Book, which originally appeared between 1985 and 1996.
- A 1997 live-action film also by MDP Worldwide; The Second Jungle Book: Mowgli & Baloo, which starred Jamie Williams as Mowgli. In this story, the character has no spoken dialogue.
- A 1998 live-action television series titled Mowgli: The New Adventures of the Jungle Book, which starred Sean Price-McConnell as Mowgli. It was made by Alliance Entertainment and it premiered on Fox Kids in the United States on February 7, 1998 and ran until August 1 of the same year.
- In the 1998 live-action Disney direct-to-video adaptation The Jungle Book: Mowgli's Story, he was played by Brandon Baker. Ryan Taylor also plays a younger version of the character at the beginning of the story. Fred Savage narrates the story off-screen as an adult version of the character.
- A 1998 live-action television film titled The Jungle Book: Search for the Lost Treasure, which starred Antonio Baker as Mowgli.
- A 2010 CGI animated TV series made by DQ Entertainment International, where Mowgli was voiced by Emma Tate (seasons 1-2) and Sarah Natochenny (season 3).
- A 2016 live-action/CGI hybrid remake of Disney's animated version of The Jungle Book directed by Jon Favreau, which starred newcomer Neel Sethi as Mowgli. Kendrick Reyes also played Mowgli as a toddler during a flashback sequence narrated by Kaa the python. In 2018, Sethi confirmed that he would reprise the role in an upcoming sequel to the film.
- A 2018 live-action adaptation titled Mowgli: Legend of the Jungle, directed by Andy Serkis, which starred Rohan Chand as Mowgli.
- A 2020 fanfiction radio drama titled Protector which takes place eleven years after the events of the 2016 film. Mowgli saves a young woman from the village named Nira after she accidentally stumbles into Kaa's feeding grounds. While initially afraid of him, Nira realizes that this man is the one her people call the "Protector". Mowgli begins to escort her back home, and along the way, he opens her eyes to the beauty of the jungle and introduces her to several of his jungle friends. Despite the two of them bickering constantly, Nira finds herself drawn to Mowgli and his way of life. The more time she spends with him, the harder she knows it will be to say good-bye to him.
- A 2024 live-action Mexican independent short film titled Mi Hermano Lobo (My Brother Wolf) written and directed by Rafael Jaime Zorrilla and based on his 2020 memoir of the same name, which starred 13-year-old newcomer Héctor Mateo García Díaz Infante as Mowgli (being the first-ever Mexican on-screen portrayal of the character). Jaime Zorrilla envisioned Mowgli with an athletic, lean and handsome physical appearance which was based both on Disney's version of the character designed in 1967 as well as French illustrator Marcel Laverdet's depiction of the character for a 1999 abridged and illustrated edition of the original 1894 novel. His warm, gentle and kind-hearted personality was based on his first childhood friend, Miguel as well as Matthew Labyorteaux's performance as Albert Quinn Ingalls on Little House on the Prairie from 1978 to 1983, Noah Hathaway's performance as Atreyu in The NeverEnding Story (1984) and Jeremy Sumpter's performance as Peter Pan in Peter Pan (2003). The character also sings a lullaby titled Ángel Valiente (Brave Angel) (A cover version of Beautiful Dreamer). This was Díaz Infante's final role as a child actor with a pre-pubescent voice, as his voice deepened a year after the short film's release. The short film was released on YouTube on December 3, 2024 (the United Nations' International Day of Persons with Disabilities). An alternate version of the short film with an audio description track in Latin Spanish was also released the same day. The short film was part of the Official Selection within the 4th Children's, Science, Nature & Wildlife Film Festival in 2025.
- In 1984–1985, Jonathan Larson and Seth Goldman wrote an ultimately unproduced musical called Mowgli.

== See also ==
- Feral children in mythology and fiction
- Rima, a jungle girl character from a 1904 book and 1959 film
