= The Jungle Book (franchise) =

Disney franchise

Disney's The Jungle Book
- Logo used for the 2016 film
- Created by: Walt Disney Animation Studios; Rudyard Kipling (original stories and characters)
- Original work: The Jungle Book (1967)
- Owner: The Walt Disney Company
- Years: 1967–present
- Based on: The Jungle Book by Rudyard Kipling

Films and television
- Film(s): The Jungle Book (1967); Rudyard Kipling's The Jungle Book (1994); The Jungle Book 2 (2003); The Jungle Book (2016)
- Animated series: TaleSpin (1990–1991); Jungle Cubs (1996–1998); TaleSpin (reboot)
- Direct-to-video: The Jungle Book: Mowgli's Story (1998)

Games
- Video game(s): The Jungle Book (1993/1994); TaleSpin (1991/1992); The Jungle Book Groove Party (2000); Kinect: Disneyland Adventures (2011)^{*}; Disney Infinity 3.0 (2015)^{*}

Audio
- Soundtrack(s): The Jungle Book (1967); More Jungle Book (1968); The Jungle Book (2016)
- Original music: "The Bare Necessities"; "I Wan'na Be like You"; "Colonel Hathi's March"; "Trust in Me"; "That's What Friends Are For"; "My Own Home"; "W-I-L-D"; "Jungle Rhythm"; "Right Where I Belong"

Miscellaneous
- Theme park attraction(s): The Jungle Book: Alive with Magic (2016)
- ^{*} Work where this franchise's characters or settings appeared as part of a crossover.

The Jungle Book is a Disney media franchise that commenced with the theatrical release of the 1967 feature film. It is based on Rudyard Kipling's works of the same name. The franchise includes a 2003 sequel to the animated film and three live-action films produced by Walt Disney Pictures.

== Animated films ==
=== The Jungle Book ===
The Jungle Book is a 1967 animated musical comedy film produced by Walt Disney Productions. Inspired by Rudyard Kipling's classic 1894 The Jungle Book, it was directed by Wolfgang Reitherman. It was the last film to be produced by Walt Disney, who died during its production.

In this animated musical film adaptation of Rudyard Kipling's stories, Mowgli, an abandoned child raised by wolves, has his peaceful existence threatened by the return of the man-eating tiger Shere Khan. Facing certain death, Mowgli must overcome his reluctance to leave his wolf family and return to the "man village", but he is not alone on his quest: aided by Bagheera the wise panther, and later by the carefree bear Baloo, he braves the jungle's many perils.

=== The Jungle Book 2 ===
The Jungle Book 2 is a 2003 animated adventure musical comedy film produced by DisneyToon Studios. The theatrical version of the film was released in France on February 5, 2003, and released in the United States on February 14. Also inspired by Rudyard Kipling's classic children's books, the film is a sequel to the 1967 animated musical film The Jungle Book, and stars Haley Joel Osment as the voice of Mowgli and John Goodman as the voice of Baloo.

Wild child Mowgli has grown fidgety with his life in the "man village", so he sneaks back to the jungle to be with his animal friends, like the beloved bear Baloo. Mowgli's disappearance, however, worries the villagers who raise him, so his friends, Shanti and Ranjan, journeys into the jungle to find him. But all is not well there. Mowgli's old foe, the fierce tiger Shere Khan, is out to get revenge on him, being more determined to kill him than ever.

== Live-action original films ==
=== Rudyard Kipling's The Jungle Book ===
Rudyard Kipling's The Jungle Book is a 1994 live-action film co-written and directed by Stephen Sommers, based on the Mowgli stories in The Jungle Book and The Second Jungle Book written by Rudyard Kipling. The film stars Jason Scott Lee as Mowgli, Cary Elwes as his adversary Captain Boone, and Lena Headey as Mowgli's eventual love interest Kitty. Also appearing in the film were Sam Neill, John Cleese, Jason Flemyng and Ron Donachie.

When his father is killed by a jungle tiger, Mowgli is orphaned and grows up in the wild, raised by beloved animals. Years later, the bracelet given to him by his childhood friend, Kitty, is stolen. In pursuing it, he discovers Monkey City with all its treasures. He is reunited with Kitty, but struggles to adapt to civilization. When Kitty's unscrupulous suitor, Capt. Boone, attempts to raid the jungle of its treasures, Mowgli's life is imperiled.

The film differed from the animated adaption, functioning more as an action-adventure film with somewhat-more adult themes and not having the animal characters speak. The film was funded independently by MDP Worldwide with Disney handling half of the film's budget and funding in exchange for distribution rights in some territories. While MDP produced a prequel entitled The Second Jungle Book: Mowgli & Baloo in 1997, Disney was not involved in its production.

=== The Jungle Book: Mowgli's Story ===
The Jungle Book: Mowgli's Story is a 1998 live-action direct-to-video film based on Rudyard Kipling's book of the same name. The film chronicles the life of the boy named Mowgli (portrayed by Brandon Baker) from the time he lived with humans as an infant to the time when he rediscovered humans again as a teenager. Animal companions, including Baloo (Brian Doyle-Murray), Bagheera (Eartha Kitt), Hathi (Marty Ingels), and many more, guide Mowgli in the wilds of India and protect him against Shere Khan (Sherman Howard).

== Live-action remake films ==
=== The Jungle Book ===
The Jungle Book is 2016 fantasy adventure film directed by Jon Favreau, written by Justin Marks, and produced by Walt Disney Pictures. The film stars Neel Sethi as Mowgli and features the voices of Bill Murray as Baloo, Ben Kingsley as Bagheera, Idris Elba as Shere Khan, Scarlett Johansson as Kaa, Lupita Nyong'o as Raksha, Giancarlo Esposito as Akela, and Christopher Walken as King Louie. The film was released on April 15, 2016 to critical acclaim.

After a fierce tiger threatens his life, Mowgli, an orphan boy raised by wolves, leaves his jungle home and, guided by a stern panther and a free-spirited bear, sets out on a journey of self-discovery.

=== The Jungle Book sequel ===
Following the film's early financial and critical successes, the studio has begun work on a sequel film. Favreau is reported to return as director, while screenwriter Justin Marks is also in negotiations to return and planned to shoot it back to back with The Lion King remake, but there hasn't been any news on the project since then.

== Television ==
=== TaleSpin ===
TaleSpin is a half-hour animated adventure series based in the fictional city of Cape Suzette, that first aired in 1990 as a preview on The Disney Channel and later that year as part of The Disney Afternoon, with characters adapted from the 1967 animated film The Jungle Book.

Baloo, King Louie and Shere Khan operate businesses in Cape Suzette.

=== Jungle Cubs ===
Jungle Cubs is an whimsical animated series produced by Disney for ABC in 1996. It was based on their 1967 animated film The Jungle Book, but set in the youth of the animal characters. The show was a hit, running for two seasons in syndication before moving its re-runs to the Disney Channel. The show was broadcast on Toon Disney, but was taken off the schedule in 2001. The show did air in the United Kingdom on Disney Cinemagic and in Latin America until it was removed. The show's theme song is a hip-hop version of "The Bare Necessities" performed by Lou Rawls.

Animal children cope with life on their own in the wild.

== Video games ==
=== TaleSpin ===
TaleSpin is a 1991 video game published by Capcom for the Nintendo Entertainment System. It is based on the children's animated series with the same name. TaleSpin was also released by Capcom on the Game Boy. Sega released its own versions of TaleSpin on the Sega Mega Drive/Genesis and Sega Game Gear. NEC also made one for their TurboGrafx-16 system. This game involves the adventures of Baloo and Kit Cloudkicker, two bears delivering cargo for Rebecca Cunningham, another bear. However, Shere Khan, the evil tiger tycoon, wants to put Rebecca out of business, so he hires air pirates, led by Don Karnage, to do his dirty work.

=== The Jungle Book ===
The Jungle Book is a series of video games based on the 1967 film, primarily released in 1994. It was first released by Virgin Interactive in 1993 for the Master System. Conversions for the Game Boy, NES (for which it was one of the last titles released by a third-party developer), Sega Mega Drive/Genesis, Sega Game Gear, Super NES, and PC followed in 1994, and a remake for the Game Boy Advance was released in 2003. While gameplay is the same on all versions, technological differences between the systems forced changes – in some case drastic – in level design, resulting in six fairly different versions of the 'same' game.

=== The Jungle Book Groove Party ===
The Jungle Book Groove Party is a music rhythm video game developed by Ubisoft and published by Disney Interactive for PlayStation and PlayStation 2. Featuring similar gameplay to the Dance Dance Revolution series, the game features characters and songs from the 1967 animated film The Jungle Book. The game was packaged with a dance pad.

=== Kinect: Disneyland Adventures ===
Kinect: Disneyland Adventures is a 2011 motion-controlled open world video game for Kinect for Xbox 360 developed by Frontier Developments and published by Microsoft Studios. The game takes place in Disneyland Park. Baloo and Mowgli from the 1967 animated film The Jungle Book appear as meet-and-greet characters in Adventureland within the game.

=== Disney Infinity ===
Disney Infinity was an action-adventure toys-to-life video game series that ran from 2013 to 2016 developed by Avalanche Software and published by Disney Interactive Studios. The 1967 animated film The Jungle Book was referenced throughout the series starting from the second game, Disney Infinity 2.0 (2014), with in-game toys and power discs based on the film's characters and settings. In 2016, a Baloo figure was released for the console and later on mobile versions of Disney Infinity 3.0 (2015), which required a downloadable content update to use. Although the figure was released to promote the 2016 live-action film, it is based on the 1967 version of the character.

=== Disney Magic Kingdoms ===
The world builder game Disney Magic Kingdoms includes Mowgli, Bagheera, Baloo, Shere Khan and King Louie as playable characters, along with some attractions based on the film, including Baloo's Oasis, Jungle River Drift, and Kaa's Jungle Gym (featuring Kaa as a non-player character). In the game the characters are involved in new storylines that serve as a continuation of The Jungle Book (ignoring other material from the franchise).

=== Disney Mirrorverse ===
An alternate version of Baloo, based on his TaleSpin persona, appears as a playable character in the video game Disney Mirrorverse.

== Music ==
=== The Jungle Book soundtrack ===
The Jungle Book soundtrack has been released in three different versions since the film's release in 1967. The film score was composed by George Bruns, with songs written by Terry Gilkyson and the Sherman Brothers.

- "Colonel Hathi's March (The Elephant Song)" (Richard M. Sherman, Robert B. Sherman)
- "The Bare Necessities" (Terry Gilkyson)
- "I Wan'na Be Like You" (Richard M. Sherman, Robert B. Sherman)
- "Trust in Me (The Python's Song)" (Richard M. Sherman, Robert B. Sherman)
- "That's What Friends Are For (The Vulture Song)" (Richard M. Sherman, Robert B. Sherman)
- "My Own Home" (Richard M. Sherman, Robert B. Sherman)

=== More Jungle Book ===
In 1968, Disneyland Records released the album More Jungle Book (given the subtitle ...Further Adventures of Baloo and Mowgli), an unofficial sequel also written by screenwriter Larry Simmons, which continued the story of the film, and included Phil Harris and Louis Prima voicing their film roles. In the record, Baloo (Harris) is missing Mowgli (Ginny Tyler), so he teams up with King Louie (Prima) and Bagheera (Dal McKennon) to take him from the man village. Four new songs were composed for the record, two of which ("Baloo's Blues" and "It's a Kick") made appearances as bonus tracks on CD versions of the soundtrack to the original The Jungle Book.

- "Baloo's Blues" (Richard M. Sherman, Robert B. Sherman)
  - performed by Phil Harris
  - later appeared as bonus track on the 1990 and 1997 re-issues of The Jungle Book soundtrack
- "Jungle Fever" (Floyd Huddleston, Camarata)
  - performed by Phil Harris
- "If You Wanna See Some Strange Behavior (Take a Look at Man)" (Mel Leven)
  - performed by Louis Prima
- "It's a Kick" (Richard M. Sherman, Robert B. Sherman)
  - performed by Phil Harris
  - later appeared as bonus track on the 1990 and 1997 re-issues of The Jungle Book soundtrack
- "Bare Necessities" (Terry Gilkyson)
  - performed by Phil Harris and Sebastian Cabot
  - reprise version from The Jungle Book soundtrack

== Theme park attractions ==
=== The Jungle Book: Alive with Magic ===
A nighttime show based on the 2016 live-action film, The Jungle Book: Alive with Magic, taking place at Disney's Animal Kingdom, opened on May 28, 2016, with soft opening date one night earlier. It filled the space of the delayed Rivers of Light night-time show. The attraction was closed months later on September 5.

=== Meet and greets ===
Baloo and King Louie appear at all the Disney Parks for meet and greets. They are located in Adventureland and Disney's Animal Kingdom. Mowgli has also appeared in parades and occasional meet and greets, but has become less common in recent years.

== Cast and characters ==
List indicators
- A dark gray cell indicates the character was not featured in the film.
- A ^{V} indicates a voice-only role.
- A ^{Y} indicates an actor or actress portrayed a younger version of their character.

Characters	Animated films		Television series			Live-action films		
Characters	The Jungle Book	The Jungle Book 2	TaleSpin	Jungle Cubs		The Jungle Book	The Jungle Book: Mowgli's Story	The Jungle Book
Characters	The Jungle Book	The Jungle Book 2	TaleSpin	Season 1	Season 2	The Jungle Book	The Jungle Book: Mowgli's Story	The Jungle Book
Mowgli	Bruce Reitherman	Haley Joel Osment				Jason Scott Lee	Brandon Baker	Neel Sethi
Mowgli	Bruce Reitherman	Haley Joel Osment				Sean Naegeli^{Y}	Ryan Taylor^{Y}	Kendrick Reyes^{Y}
Baloo	Phil Harris	John Goodman	Ed Gilbert	Pamela Segall	Pamela Segall	Casey	Brian Doyle-Murray^{V}	Bill Murray^{V}
Baloo	Phil Harris	John Goodman	Ed Gilbert	Pamela Segall	Pamela Segall	Shannon Shea (Note: Shannon Shea served as Baloo's body double in certain scenes.)	Brian Doyle-Murray^{V}	Bill Murray^{V}
Bagheera	Sebastian Cabot	Bob Joles		E.G. Daily	Dee Bradley Baker	Shadow	Eartha Kitt^{V}	Ben Kingsley^{V}
Shere Khan	George Sanders	Tony Jay	Tony Jay	Jason Marsden	Jason Marsden	Bombay	Sherman Howard^{V}	Idris Elba^{V}
King Louie	Louis Prima	Silent cameo	Jim Cummings	Jason Marsden	Cree Summer	Lowell		Christopher Walken^{V}
Kaa	Sterling Holloway	Jim Cummings		Jim Cummings	Jim Cummings	Computer-generated Python		Scarlett Johansson^{V}
Hathi	J. Pat O'Malley	Jim Cummings		Rob Paulsen	Stephen Furst		Marty Ingels^{V}	
Flaps	Chad Stuart	Brian Cummings						
Dizzy	Lord Tim Hudson	Jess Harnell						
Ziggy	Digby Wolfe	Jess Harnell						
Buzzy	J. Pat O'Malley	Jeff Glen Bennett						
Hathi, Jr.	Clint Howard	Jimmy Bennett						
Akela	John Abbot			Rob Paulsen			Clancy Brown^{V}	Giancarlo Esposito^{V}
Winifred	Verna Felton			Kath Soucie	Kath Soucie			
Raksha	Silent cameo						Peri Gilpin^{V}	Lupita Nyong'o^{V}
Shanti	Darleen Carr	Mae Whitman						
Ranjan		Connor Funk						
Lucky		Phil Collins						
Messua		Veena Bidasha						
Village Leader		John Rhys-Davies						
Grey Brother						Shannon		Brighton Rose^{V}
Tabaqui						Anirudh Agarwal	Stephen Tobolowsky^{V}	
