= The Jungle Book (disambiguation) =

The Jungle Book is an 1894 collection of stories written by Rudyard Kipling, and may also refer to:

== Films ==
- Rudyard Kipling's Jungle Book (1942), a live-action film adaptation by United Artists
- The Jungle Book (1967 film), an animated film adaptation by Disney
  - The Jungle Book 2 (2003), a sequel to Disney's 1967 film
- The Jungle Book (1994 film)
- The Jungle Book (2016 film), Disney's third live-action remake of the 1967 animated film
- The Jungle Book (1992), an animated film from Bevanfield Films
- Jungle Book (1995), an animated film from Jetlag Productions
- The Jungle Book: Mowgli's Story (1998), Disney's second remake of the 1967 animated film, in which many of the plot elements are changed

== Television ==
- The Jungle Book (1989 TV series), a Japanese anime series
- The Jungle Book (2010 TV series), a 2010 CGI TV series

== Theatre ==
- The Jungle Book, a musical adaption by Ephraim Sidon, first staged in 1996
- A dzsungel könyve (English: The Jungle Book) (1996), a Hungarian musical

== Other uses ==
- Harvey Kurtzman's Jungle Book, a 1959 graphic novel
- The Jungle Book (Disney franchise)
  - The Jungle Book (1967 soundtrack)
  - The Jungle Book (2016 soundtrack)
  - The Jungle Book (video game), a 1994 adaptation of the 1967 film
  - The Jungle Book Groove Party, a 2000 dance video game
- Jungle Book (video game), a 1996 video game based on the 1994 film The Jungle Book
- The Jungle Book: Alive with Magic, a 2016 amusement ride
- The Jungle Book, an EP by That Handsome Devil

== See also ==
- Adaptations of The Jungle Book
- The Second Jungle Book, an 1895 collection of Kipling stories
- The Third Jungle Book, a 1992 pastiche story collection by Pamela Jekel
- The Second Jungle Book: Mowgli & Baloo (1997), a live-action film adaptation
