= List of adaptations of The Jungle Book =

Film and other versions of the Kipling stories

There have been many adaptations of Rudyard Kipling's The Jungle Book stories, in film and other media. The stories, which were inspired by his life in India, were published in the 1894 The Jungle Book and its 1895 sequel, The Second Jungle Book.

Film adaptations date back to 1937's Elephant Boy, the only adaptation released in Kipling's lifetime. Many adaptations followed.

== Books ==
- Harvey Kurtzman's Jungle Book, a 1959 satirical graphic novel aimed at an adult audience.
- De Junglebloem (The Jungle Flower), a 1969 Belgian comic book from the Suske en Wiske Spike and Suzy series by Willy Vandersteen.
- The Third Jungle Book, a 1992 pastiche story collection by Pamela Jekel.

== Feature films ==
=== Mowgli stories ===
==== Theatrical films ====
- The Jungle Book (1942 film), a live-action film adaptation by United Artists. Directed by Zoltan Korda
- The Jungle Book (1967 film), animated film adaptation by Disney. Directed by Wolfgang Reitherman
- The Jungle Book (1994 film), live-action adaptation by MDP Worldwide and distributed by Disney, focusing more on the storyline from the second book. Hence, it is the only Disney produced/distributed to depict Mowgli as an adult in the majority of the plot. Directed by Stephen Sommers
  - The Second Jungle Book: Mowgli & Baloo (1997), A prequel to the 1994 film from MDP Worldwide/TriStar Pictures that adapts the first book. Directed by Dee McLachlan
- The Jungle Book: Mowgli's Story (1998), a live-action film adaptation by Disney. Directed by Nick Marck
- The Jungle Book: Search for the Lost Treasure (1998), a live-action film adaptation by Multicom. Directed by Michael McGreevey
- The Jungle Book 2 (2003), a sequel to Disney's 1967 film. Directed by Steve Trenbirth
- The Jungle Book (2016 film), Disney's third live-action remake of the 1967 animated film. Directed by Jon Favreau
- Mowgli: Legend of the Jungle (2018), a live-action film adaptation by Netflix/Warner Bros. Directed by Andy Serkis.

==== Direct-to-video films ====
- Adventures of Mowgli, five Soviet animated film adaptations, originally released between 1967 and 1971.
- Jungle Book (1990), animated film from Golden Films.
- The Jungle Book (1992), animated film from Bevanfield Films.
- Jungle Book (1995), animated film from Jetlag Productions.

=== Other stories ===
- Elephant Boy (1937), based on the story "Toomai of the Elephants".
- Rikki-Tikki-Tavi (1975), based on the story of the same name.

== Television ==
=== Mowgli stories ===
- Mowgli's Brothers (1976), a made for TV animated film based on story of same name by Chuck Jones.
- Jungle Book Shōnen Mowgli (1989–90), a 1989 Japanese anime series, later dubbed into several languages.
- TaleSpin, a spin-off of the 1967 animated film.
- Jungle Cubs, another spin-off of the 1967 animated film.
- Mowgli: The New Adventures of the Jungle Book, a 1998 live-action TV series.
- The Jungle Book (2010 TV series), a CGI animated series.

=== Other stories ===
- The White Seal (1975), an animated television film based on the story of the same name, by Chuck Jones.
- Rikki-Tikki-Tavi (1975), an animated television film based on the story of the same name, by Chuck Jones.

== Theatre ==
- The Jungle Book, a musical adaptation by Ephraim Sidon, first staged in 1996
- A dzsungel könyve (English: The Jungle Book) (1996), a Hungarian musical.

== Other ==
- The Jungle Book (Disney franchise)
  - The Jungle Book (soundtrack), from the 1967 film.
  - The Jungle Book (video game), a 1994 adaptation of the 1967 film.
  - The Jungle Book Groove Party, a 2000 dance video game.
  - The Jungle Book: Alive with Magic, a 2016 amusement ride.
- The Jungle Book, an EP by That Handsome Devil, consisting of covers of songs from the 1967 film.
