= The Jungle Book (1967 soundtrack) =

1967 soundtrack album by various artists

Soundtrack album by various artists
- Released: 1967
- Recorded: February 1964 – June 1967
- Studios: Sound Stage A, Walt Disney Studio Lot
- Genres: Soundtrack; jazz
- Labels: Disneyland; Walt Disney
- Producer: Larry Blakely

Professional ratings
Review scores
Source	Rating
AllMusic	4.5/5 stars

The Jungle Book, the soundtrack to the Disney film The Jungle Book, has been released in three different versions. The film score was composed by George Bruns, with songs written by Terry Gilkyson and the Sherman Brothers.

== Composition ==
The instrumental music was written by George Bruns and orchestrated by Walter Sheets. Two of the cues were reused from previous Disney films, with the scene where Mowgli wakes up after escaping King Louie using one of Bruns' themes for Sleeping Beauty, and Bagheera giving a eulogy to Baloo when he mistakenly thinks the bear was killed by Shere Khan being accompanied by Paul J. Smith's organ score from Snow White and the Seven Dwarfs.

"Overture" and "Jungle Beat" are scores separated from one deleted score "The Sand of Time" from The Sword in the Stone.

Longtime Disney collaborator Terry Gilkyson was brought in to write the songs for the film. Gilkyson delivered several complete songs which were faithful in tone to Rudyard Kipling's novel, but Walt Disney felt that his efforts were too dark. The Sherman Brothers were brought in to do a complete rewrite, on the condition that they not read Kipling's book. The only piece of Gilkyson's work which survived to the final film was his upbeat tune "The Bare Necessities", which was liked by the rest of the film crew. In one of his first union jobs, famed songwriter Van Dyke Parks arranged the version of "Necessities" heard in the film.

Walt Disney asked the Shermans to "find scary places and write fun songs" for their compositions, and frequently brought them to storyline sessions. The duo decided to do songs that fit in the story and advanced the plot instead of being interruptive. The song "Trust in Me" is based upon a song entitled "Land of Sand", which had been written by the Sherman Brothers for, but not used in, Mary Poppins.

"We're Your Friends" was originally conceived as a rock and roll song, sung by the quartet of vultures. The vultures were designed based on The Beatles, with moptop haircuts and Liverpudlian accents, and would be voiced by the band, which did not come to fruition due to problems with their schedule. During production Disney decided the '60s-style rock would cause the song to be considered dated later, leading "We're Your Friends" to be changed to the barbershop quartet that appears in the film. One of The Mellomen's members, Bill Lee, sang as Shere Khan during the final recording of the song because George Sanders was unavailable, and can be heard on the soundtrack.

== Versions ==
=== Storyteller (1967) ===
The first version was Walt Disney Presents the Story and Songs of The Jungle Book, also known as the "Storyteller" version, issued on the Disneyland Records label. It featured a retelling of the story with narration by voice actor Dal McKennon as Bagheera, and dialogue and sound effects from the film itself along with the songs. It was a commercial success, being certified Gold by the RIAA, and was later nominated for a Grammy Award for Best Album for Children. Another version, simply titled The Jungle Book, was issued on the Buena Vista Records label, featuring less narration and dialogue to be marketed for adults. It was first reissued on CD in 1990, as Disneyland Records was reworked into Walt Disney Records.

Track listing

No.	Title	Writer(s)	Performer(s) (character)	Length
1.	"Trust in Me"	Sherman Brothers	Sterling Holloway
2.	"Colonel Hathi's March"	Sherman Brothers	J. Pat O'Malley and Verna Felton, chorus ("pachyderm chorus")
3.	"The Bare Necessities"	Terry Gilkyson	Phil Harris and Bruce Reitherman
4.	"I Wanna Be Like You"	Sherman Brothers	Louis Prima and Phil Harris
5.	"Colonel Hathi's March (reprise)"	Sherman Brothers	J. Pat O' Malley, Verna Felton and chorus
6.	"That's What Friends Are For (The Vulture Song)"	Sherman Brothers	J. Pat O'Malley, Chad Stuart, Lord Tim Hudson, Bruce Reitherman, and Bill Lee
7.	"My Own Home"	Sherman Brothers	Darleen Carr
8.	"The Bare Necessities" (reprise)"	Terry Gilkyson	Phil Harris and Sebastian Cabot

=== Songs from The Jungle Book and Other Jungle Favorites (1967) ===
Disneyland Records issued another soundtrack album, Songs from Walt Disney's The Jungle Book and other Jungle Favorites, which featured reworked jazz versions of the film's songs plus two covers, performed by Louis Prima and his band under the title "The Jungle V.I.P.s".

Tracks

No.	Title	Writer(s)	Length
1.	"Colonel Hathi's March"	Sherman Brothers
2.	"The Bare Necessities"	Gilkyson
3.	"I Wan'na Be Like You"	Sherman Brothers
4.	"The Abba Dabba Honeymoon"	Arthur Fields, Walter Donovan
5.	"Trust In Me"	Sherman Brothers
6.	"That's What Friends Are For"	Sherman Brothers
7.	"My Own Home"	Sherman Brothers
8.	"Civilization"	Bob Hilliard, Carl Sigman

=== 1997 reissue ===
Disney Records reissued the soundtrack in 1997, coinciding with the reissue of the film on VHS to celebrate its 30th anniversary. The soundtrack marked the first time a majority of George Bruns' instrumental score was included. This version included an interview with the Sherman Brothers, and four bonus songs: two demos of the discarded Terry Gilkyson songs, and two songs taken from the 1968 Disneyland Records album More Jungle Book, an unofficial sequel to the film written by screenwriter Larry Simmons.

Track listing

All tracks are written by George Bruns, except where noted.

No.	Title	Writer(s)	Performer	Length
1.	"Overture"		(score)	2:43
2.	"Baby"		(score)	2:11
3.	"Colonel Hathi's March (Elephant Song)"	Sherman, Sherman	J. Pat O'Malley, Verna Felton and Chorus	2:32
4.	"The Bare Necessities"	Gilkyson	Bruce Reitherman, Phil Harris	3:31
5.	"I Wan'na Be Like You (The Monkey Song)"	Sherman, Sherman	Louis Prima, Phil Harris	4:39
6.	"Monkey Chase"		(score)	1:06
7.	"Tell Him"		(score)	2:15
8.	"Colonel Hathi's March (Reprise)"	Sherman, Sherman	J. Pat O'Malley, Verna Felton and Chorus	2:00
9.	"Jungle Beat"		(score)	1:22
10.	"Trust in Me (Python's Song)"	Sherman, Sherman	Sterling Holloway	2:50
11.	"What'cha Wanna Do"		(score)	3:09
12.	"That's What Friends Are For (Vulture Song)"	Sherman, Sherman	J. Pat O'Malley, Chad Stuart, Lord Tim Hudson, Digby Wolfe, Bruce Reitherman, Bill Lee	2:06
13.	"Tiger Fight"		(score)	2:44
14.	"Poor Bear"		(score)	1:08
15.	"My Own Home (Jungle Book Theme)"	Sherman, Sherman	Darlene Carr	3:32
16.	"The Bare Necessities (Reprise)"	Gilkyson	Phil Harris and Sebastian Cabot	0:54
17.	"Interview with the Sherman Brothers"		Spoken interview with Robert E. and Richard Sherman	12:26
18.	"Baloo's Blues"	Sherman, Sherman	Phil Harris	3:02
19.	"It's a Kick"	Sherman, Sherman	Phil Harris	1:42
20.	"Brother's All" (Demo Recording)	Gilkyson	Gilkyson	3:41
21.	"The Song of the Seeonee" (Demo Recording)	Gilkyson	Gilkyson	2:27

== Certifications and sales ==
Region	Certification	Certified units/sales
France	—	100,000
Germany	—	100,000
Netherlands	—	30,000
Sweden (GLF)	Diamond	200,000
United Kingdom Original release	—	200,000
United Kingdom (BPI) 1989 release	Gold	100,000^{^}
United Kingdom (BPI) 2006 release	Gold	100,000^{‡}
United States (RIAA)	Gold	500,000^{^}
^{^} Shipments figures based on certification alone.^{‡} Sales+streaming figures based on certification alone.

== Megamix single ==
In 1993, a medley of "I Wan'na Be like You" and "The Bare Necessities" called "The Jungle Book Groove" was released by Disney's Hollywood record label. Credited by the Official Charts Company as being by the artist Jungle Book, the record charted at number 14 on the UK Singles Chart and spent 8 weeks in the UK top 75. The song was credited as "Disney Cast" on German compilation albums.

== Bibliography ==
- Hollis, Tim; Ehrbar, Greg (2006). Mouse Tracks: The Story of Walt Disney Records. University Press of Mississippi. ISBN 978-1-57806-849-4.
