= Bandar-log =

Fictional term from The Jungle Book

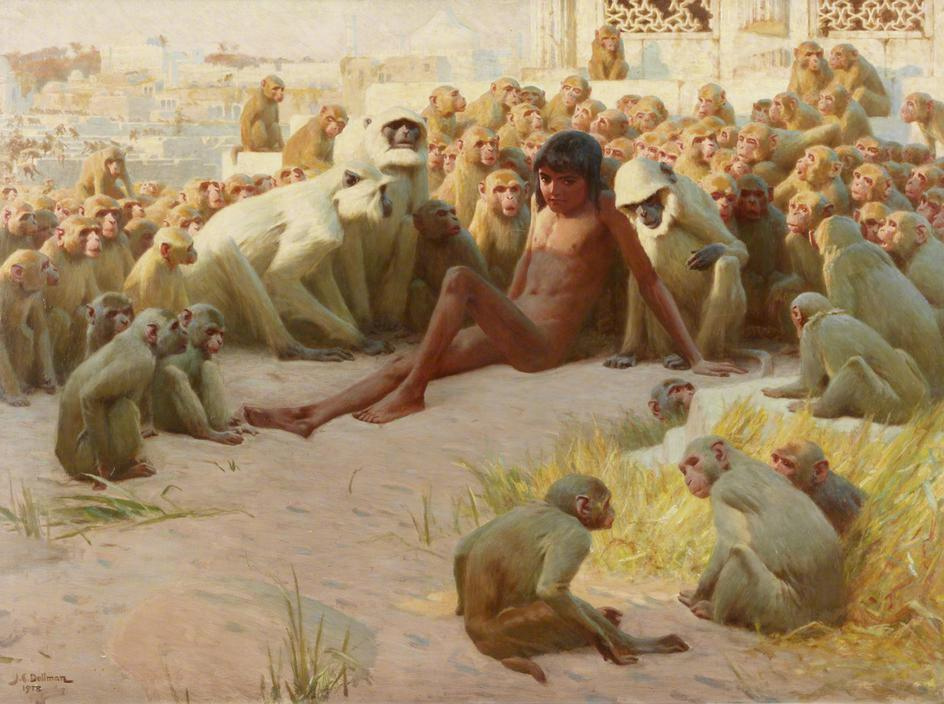
Mowgli made leader of the Bandar Log (John Charles Dollman, 1903)

Bandar-log (Hindi: बन्दर-लोग) is a term used in Rudyard Kipling's The Jungle Book (1894) to describe the monkeys and Hoolock gibbons of the Seeonee jungle.

== Description ==
In Hindi, Bandar means "monkey" and log means "people" – hence the term simply refers to "monkey people". The term has also since come to refer to "any body of irresponsible chatterers".

== History ==
The Bandar-log feature most prominently in the story "Kaa's Hunting", where their scatterbrained anarchy causes them to be treated as pariahs by the rest of the jungle. Their foolish and chattering ways are illustrated by their slogan: We are great. We are free. We are wonderful. We are the most wonderful people in all the jungle! We all say so, and so it must be true. Bandar-log communicate almost entirely through the repetition of other animals' speech.

The Road-Song of the Bandar-log is a companion poem to 'Kaa's Hunting', and demonstrates Kipling's strong adherence to poetic form.

== In other media ==
- The Bandar-log appear in Disney's animated film The Jungle Book, where they are portrayed as having moptop hairstyles and prehensile tails, the latter being a feature which is non-existent in Old World monkeys. It is stated repeatedly in the Kipling story that the Bandar-log "have no king", but the Disney film version gave them one: King Louie. He is a Bornean orangutan, but in reality, orangutans are not found in India. The Bandar-log capture Mowgli and take him to Louie. They participate in the "I Wan'na Be Like You" musical number, during which Baloo and Bagheera attempt to free Mowgli from Louie who tries to get Mowgli to divulge the secrets to the "red flower" (a name given to fire).
  - Some of the monkeys and gibbons are also included in the television series TaleSpin, as employees of Louie's Island-Bar.
  - The Bandar-log reappear in The Jungle Book 2, this time without their leader Louie who was mentioned to have left the jungle. They are just seen dancing with Baloo, Mowgli, and other animals during the song "W-I-L-D".
- In Jungle Book Shonen Mowgli, Louis/Alba and his monkey/gibbon army are clearly based on the Bandar-log although they are not referred to as such. They also have an alliance with Shere Khan, with Louis/Alba being an informant, but also fear him. After they destroyed Mowgli's hut, they were persuaded to cast off their alliance, which they do, and later act as an independent gang.
- The Bandar-Log also appear in the Soviet series Adventures of Mowgli. Like in the literature and aforementioned portrayals, they kidnap Mowgli and bring him to their city. They are later defeated by Kaa's hypnotic dancing.
- In "Brazil on the Move" (John Dos Passos/1963), the author refers to the profitable business of capturing primates for scientific uses in the frontier river city of Iquitos, Peru: "One dealer, a young man who started a number of years ago with a 100 soles for capital, and is now reputed to be a millionaire, told us how his hunters caught the poor banderlog." (Paragon House edition, 1991, p. 106)
- In the 1994 live-action Disney film, the Bandar-log appear more as mischievous treasure thieves associated with King Louie (an orangutan again), who inhabit an ancient lost city. Their vocal effects are provided by using sounds of chimpanzees and siamangs. After a rhesus macaque steals Mowgli's bracelet, Mowgli follows him to the city. Inside the treasure room, the Bandar-log gather with their "king", King Louie, who is wearing King Louis XIV's crown. Louie summons his guardian Kaa to kill Mowgli, but Mowgli subdues the snake and Louie returns the bracelet to him. Later on, Mowgli and Captain Boone engage in a sword fight in the treasure room, watched by Louie along with the monkeys and gibbons. Mowgli injures Boone and flees, while Boone stays to pocket treasure before he is killed by Kaa.
- The Bandar-Log appear in the 1998 live-action direct to video Disney film The Jungle Book: Mowgli's Story where they live in Monkey Town and secretly work for Shere Khan. This group of both monkeys and apes consist of chimpanzees and baboons (neither of which are native to India). In the film, they kidnap Mowgli and take him to their Monkey Town, but Baloo and Bagheera manage to rescue him and escape from them.
- The Bandar-Log appear in the 2010 TV series. They are led by a female langur named Masha, who is their queen.
- In the 2016 film, the Bandar-log are portrayed as various species of Indian simians (namely lion-tailed macaques, northern pig-tailed macaques, langurs, and Hoolock gibbons that resemble northern white-cheeked gibbons) rather than all being the same species of monkey or ape. They again kidnap Mowgli and present him to their leader King Louie, who is an Indopithecus in this version, in order to learn the secret of the "red flower". As in the 1994 film, they do not speak, with the exception of Louie. Their vocal effects were created by using sounds of chimpanzees and gibbons in addition to uncredited voice actors. When King Louie gets buried beneath the rubble of his lair, the Bandar-log work to dig him out.
- The Bandar-Log are seen in Mowgli: Legend of the Jungle. Like in the anime, they are in league with Shere Khan. The Bandar-log kidnap Mowgli following his hunting exercise on Tabaqui's command so Shere Khan could kill him, but are thwarted by Bagheera, Baloo, and Kaa.
- Charles Koechlin wrote a symphonic poem Les Bandar-Log (1939–40), part of a Jungle Book Cycle.
- In Their Eyes Were Watching God, Zora Neale Hurston refers to the gossips and storytellers on the porch of Joe Starks' store as the bander log (Hurston's spelling). The novel's protagonist, Janie, passes the store on her way back into town after a long absence. In her autobiography, Dust Tracks on the Road, Hurston mentions Kipling's Jungle Book as among her favorite to read as a child, saying, "I loved his talking snakes as much as I did the hero".
- In the Dominions series of games, the nation of monkeys and gibbons inspired by Indian mythology is called Bandar Log.
- In Rumer Godden's The Dark Horse the term Bandar-Log is used to describe the many rather un-disciplined children of the protagonist John Quillen.
