= The Jungle Book (2016 soundtrack) =

2016 soundtrack album by John Debney

The Jungle Book (Original Motion Picture Soundtrack)

Soundtrack album by John Debney
- Released: April 15, 2016
- Recorded: 2015–2016
- Studios: Sony Pictures Studios, California; Esplanade Studios, New Orleans; Chalice Recording Studios, Los Angeles; Music Shed Studios, New Orleans
- Genres: Orchestral; ambience; swing jazz
- Length: 1:14:17
- Label: Walt Disney

John Debney chronology
The Young Messiah (2016)	The Jungle Book (2016)	Mother's Day (2016)

The Jungle Book (Original Motion Picture Soundtrack) is the soundtrack album to the 2016 Disney film The Jungle Book, which is a live-action animated adaptation of the 1967 animated film The Jungle Book. Directed by Jon Favreau, the film features musical score composed and conducted by his frequent collaborator John Debney, mostly drawing from George Bruns' original music. Few of the tracks were incorporated from the 1967 film's soundtrack written by Sherman Brothers and Terry Gilkyson. The score was recorded at Los Angeles, California and New Orleans, with prominent players and large orchestral members recording the score. Walt Disney Records released the film's soundtrack on April 15, 2016. It received positive reviews for the musical score, as well as incorporated songs from the 1967 film, being well received. John Debney missed the nomination for Academy Award for Best Original Score, though at the Hollywood Music in Media Awards, he won Best Original Score – Sci-Fi/Fantasy Film as well as receiving a Satellite Award for Best Original Score nomination.

== Background ==
"Music done effectively, as Walt Disney discovered, can bring the human touch to something that's essentially artificial. In his case it was animation. In ours, the environments are computer-generated and the animals are as well. Only Mowgli, played by Neel Sethi, is real. The score has to pay homage to people's deep musical memories from watching the animated feature. It has to expand upon that and service the tone of this film, which varies from funny to adventurous. It also has to bring an analog humanity to a film that’s essentially born of technology."

— Jon Favreau, in an interview to Variety, about the musical score for The Jungle Book

According to Debney, "Jon [Favreau] wanted a timeless sound to the score and I embraced that." Debney listened to the other versions of the Jungle Book soundtracks, including those for the 1967 and 1994 animated version, before working on the score, as they were so many iterations developed by other composers. Both Debney and Favreau wanted "classic Disney score with proper cultural influences", hence he imported tabla, Indian percussions, bamboo flutes and several other exotic instruments, in addition to the 104-piece orchestral members from Los Angeles Orchestra and a 50-member voice choir.

Initially, he wrote eight to ten themes for the score, which he showcased to Favreau. He created a theme for Mowgli, after several preliminary tunes he composed, saying that "[i]t's not overly emotional. It has an elegance and majesty to it. He's becoming a man through this whole experience and that's what [Debney and Favreau] wanted to say with his theme." He called Mowgli's theme the "centerpiece of the score", since "the story is narrated from Mowgli’s point of view and is learning the lessons he needs to become a man." Shere Khan's theme consists of a three- or four-note motif, while Baloo's "called for quirky strings and bass" that is "frolicking and emotional". While Bagheera doesn't have his own theme, he's represented by French horns and strings, and Kaa's music features snake-like sounds, while King Louie's features many instruments, like percussion instruments, bass marimbas, etc.

Debney brought world-renowned percussionists and orchestral players for recording in Los Angeles, as several instruments were needed in the action sequences, which are "rhythmic and fast-paced". After recording, he augmented the cues with some of the scores he created. According to him: "There's an old Disney term called 'Fantasound', and many years ago—I think it was during Fantasia—they had experimented with stereophonic sound in the theater, which had never been done before. Jon wanted to come up with the contemporary version of that, sort of an extended or heightened Dolby Atmos mix, and that's sort of what we did. We flew many sounds around the theater, more than I've done before, and just had a lot of fun with it—made the environment come alive, both with music and sound, to create these jungle environments."

While Richard M. Sherman, who co-wrote songs for the 1967 film with his brother Robert, was originally reported to be writing new songs for the remake, Favreau decided not to make the film a musical. Still, he and Debney incorporated several songs from the 1967 animated film. "The Bare Necessities", written by Terry Gilkyson, is performed by Murray and Sethi, and a cover version by Dr. John is featured in the end credits. "I Wan'na Be Like You" and "Trust in Me" — written by the Sherman Brothers — are performed by Walken and Johansson, respectively; Richard M. Sherman wrote revised lyrics for Walken's version of "I Wan'na Be Like You". Johansson's rendition of "Trust in Me" was produced by Mark Ronson and appears in the end credits only. About the inclusion of the tracks, Debney commented: "If you didn't include those songs, there probably would have been a riot in the theater. Then it became my job, honestly, to interpolate those and make them feel organic to the film. In terms of those themes and those songs, that was the job that I was given, to try and incorporate them and make them feel a part of this whole fabric of the film score." Used in trailers is the track "Take A Bow" by English alternative rock band Muse, from their 2006 album, Black Holes and Revelations.

== Critical reception ==
James Southall of Movie Wave wrote: "The Jungle Book may not quite be one of John Debney's very best but it's not far from it, probably the best thing he's done, since Lair – it's an old-school (by old, I mean 1990s) adventure romp full of memorable melody, wit and charm, not to mention great compositional technique. At times it's the closest thing to a Jerry Goldsmith score we've had, not just in the specifics of how the main theme sounds but in the construction of the action music (with a dollop of James Newton Howard in there too), and while as a result it's certainly not the most original film score, it's faultlessly entertaining from start to finish, with never a dull moment. Those of a certain vintage are going to absolutely love it". Critic Jonathan Broxton wrote: "The Jungle Book is one of the most accomplished scores of John Debney's career. It doesn't quite reach the heights of his trio of all-time greats, but it's certainly his best score since The Stoning of Soraya M. (2009), and the finale almost rivals the magnitude of the last cue from Dragonfly (2002), which is still the most tear-jerking and emotionally overwhelming music Debney has ever written".

== Charts ==
Chart (2016)	Peak position
Belgian Albums (Ultratop Flanders)	126
Belgian Albums (Ultratop Wallonia)	159
UK Soundtrack Albums (OCC)	25

== Track listing ==
All music is composed by John Debney except where noted.

No.	Title	Writer(s)	Performer(s)	Length
1.	"The Bare Necessities"	Terry Gilkyson	Dr. John and The Nite Trippers	3:36
2.	"Trust in Me"	Richard M. Sherman, Robert B. Sherman	Scarlett Johansson	2:55
3.	"Main Titles (Note: Original "When You Wish Upon a Star" melody composed by Leigh Harline; 2006–2022 Disney logo melody written and composed by Mark Mancina and co-arranged with and conducted by David Metzger; "The Jungle Book Overture" written by George Bruns.) / Jungle Run"			2:27
4.	"Wolves / Law of the Jungle"			2:16
5.	"Water Truce"			3:40
6.	"Rains Return"			1:46
7.	"Mowgli's Leaving / Elephant Theme"			3:28
8.	"Shere Khan Attacks / Stampede"			2:06
9.	"Kaa / Baloo to the Rescue" (quotes "Trust in Me")			5:21
10.	"Honeycomb Climb"			3:31
11.	"Man Village"			2:59
12.	"Mowgli and the Pit" (quotes "The Bare Necessities")			3:26
13.	"Monkeys Kidnap Mowgli"			1:52
14.	"Arriving at King Louie's Temple"			4:35
15.	"Cold Lair Chase"			4:03
16.	"Red Flower" (quotes "Trust in Me")			3:15
17.	"To the River"			3:05
18.	"Shere Khan's War Theme"			2:37
19.	"Shere Khan and the Fire"			4:52
20.	"Elephant Waterfall"			3:27
21.	"Mowgli Wins the Race" (quotes "The Bare Necessities")			0:41
22.	"Jungle Book Closes"			2:16
23.	"I Wan'na Be Like You"	Richard M. Sherman, Robert B. Sherman	Christopher Walken	3:02
24.	"The Bare Necessities (Shorter version)"	Terry Gilkyson	Bill Murray, Kermit Ruffins	3:01
Total length:				74:17
