= The Jungle Book (video game) =

Disney's The Jungle Book
- PAL region Mega Drive cover art
- Developers: Syrox Developments (Master System, Game Gear); Eurocom; East Point Software (MS-DOS)
- Publisher: Virgin Interactive Entertainment
- Producers: Robb Alvey; Hugh Binns; Patrick Gilmore
- Designers: David Bishop; Bill Anderson; Erik Yuteo; David Perry; Robb Alvey; Julian Rignall
- Programmers: Tim Rogers; Tim Swann; MS-DOS; Martin Cook; Mark Rundle
- Artists: Steve Wilding; Adrian Mannion; Colin Garratt; Steve Bedser
- Composers: Mark Miller; Tommy Tallarico; Joey Kuras; Keith Arem; Donald S. Griffin; Stephen Clarke-Willson; Richard Sherman; Robert Sherman; Terry Gilkyson; Allister Brimble (MS-DOS)
- Series: The Jungle Book
- Platforms: Master System, Genesis/Mega Drive, Super NES, Game Boy, Game Gear, NES, MS-DOS
- Release: December 1993: Master System; EU: December 1993 Game Gear; EU: December 1993; NA: 1994 Genesis/Mega Drive; EU: August 26, 1994; NA: August 1994 Super NES; NA: August 1994; EU: August 26, 1994; JP: September 1994 NES; NA: August 1994; EU: August 25, 1994 Game Boy; NA: August 1994; EU: 1994
- Genre: Platform
- Mode: Single-player

Disney's The Jungle Book is a series of platform video games based on the 1967 Disney animated film of the same name. The game was released by Virgin Interactive Entertainment for the Game Boy, Nintendo Entertainment System, Master System, Genesis/Mega Drive, Game Gear, Super Nintendo Entertainment System, and MS-DOS. While gameplay is the same on all versions, technological differences between the systems forced changes – in some case drastic – in level design, resulting in six fairly different versions of the 'same' game. This article is largely based upon the Genesis/Mega Drive version.

== Plot ==
The player controls Mowgli, a young boy who has been raised by wolves. Mowgli must leave his home in the jungle and go back to the human village because Shere Khan, a tiger, is now hunting him. Mowgli must fight jungle wildlife and ultimately Shere Khan himself to reach his village. During the journey, he meets Bagheera, Baloo, King Louie, and the hypnotist snake Kaa as well as the evil Shere Khan.

== Gameplay ==
The player controls a young Mowgli through various side-scrolling levels in a similar mold of Pitfall!. Mowgli can shoot, jump, and bounce on or avoid enemies and navigate platformed levels and enemies by running, jumping, climbing vines and using the various weapons and powerups available during the game. Mowgli starts the game with a banana projectile, but may collect invincibility masks, coconuts, double banana shots, and boomerang bananas during the game.

Levels are completed by collecting a sufficient number of gems, then finding a specific character placed in the level, with a boss character being encountered every other level. Bosses can only be damaged with projectiles. The player scores points by obtaining gems and other items.

Stages are divided into chapters which, sequentially, comprise the plot. Each chapter opens with a description of the story at that point and the objective of the stage; some stages are completed by defeating a boss, while others have 'friendly' characters which the player is required to find after collecting sufficient gems.

Each level has a time limit of six minutes. Depending on difficulty, the number of gems the player must collect to progress is either eight (easy), ten (medium), or twelve (hard), of a total of fifteen gems spread throughout the level.

== Development ==
Development of the Genesis/Mega Drive version started in 1993 at Virgin Games and with programming duties taken by David Perry, but the game, which was intended to be released within that year along with the Master System version, wasn't finished at time because of David Perry and most of the team moving away to form Shiny Entertainment. The Genesis version was subsequently finished by Eurocom in 1994, keeping in the game most of the substantial work already done by Virgin Games.

=== Music ===
The soundtrack features tunes from the Disney cartoon that it is based on, including "The Bare Necessities", "I Wan'na Be Like You (The Monkey Song)", and "Colonel Hathi's March (The Elephant Song)". The game's original music was written by Mark Miller, Tommy Tallarico, and Donald Griffin.

== Reception ==
Reception

Review score
Publication	Score			
Publication	Game Gear	NES	Sega Genesis	SNES
Electronic Gaming Monthly	6/10, 6/10, 6/10, 6/10, 7/10	8/10, 7/10, 5/10, 7/10	7/10, 8/10, 6/10, 7/10	8/10, 8/10, 7/10, 8/10, 8/10

Award
Publication	Award
Megawards	Best Mega Drive/Genesis Movie to Game Translation of the Year

In the United Kingdom, it was the top-selling Master System game in March 1994.

GamePro gave the Super NES version a mixed review. They remarked that "Mowgli's adventures are pretty repetitious, centering around his ability to swing on vines." They also criticized the limited use of Baloo, who they felt to be the film's best character, but they asserted that the "lush" graphics and animation make the game worth playing. Electronic Gaming Monthly similarly praised the graphics and animation, and was also complimentary of the controls and huge levels.

The NES version received mostly mixed reviews. GamePro criticized the "meandering game play, which plods along at a pace much slower than the rollicking movie", but assessed the animations and variety of moves to be impressive by NES standards. The four reviewers of Electronic Gaming Monthly similarly felt the game "contains some of the best animation ever seen on the NES", but criticized the overt precision required in jumping over pits.

GamePro rated the Genesis version as superior to the SNES and NES versions due to its faster and more varied gameplay and brighter graphics, though they criticized the lack of continuous and sometimes imprecise controls. Electronic Gaming Monthly praised the "fantastic" animation, sharp controls, and huge levels. They commented that the Game Gear version "holds up pretty well here, although the control needs some fine-tuning." In contrast, GamePro argued that the Game Gear version has the sharpest controls of any version of the game. They remarked that the gameplay is simplified like the NES version, but concluded: "Aided by unlimited continues, younger gamers in particular will enjoy Mowgli's charming antics."

The Jungle Book was named the Best Mega Drive/Genesis Movie to Game Translation of the Year in GameFan's 1994 "Megawards". Mega placed the game at number 21 in their Top Mega Drive Games of All Time. In 1995, Total! ranked The Jungle Book 53rd on its Top 100 SNES, citing its fluid animation and slick gameplay as the game's strengths.

== Legacy ==
The SNES, Genesis, and Game Boy versions of the game were included alongside Aladdin and The Lion King as part of Disney Classic Games Collection: Aladdin, The Lion King, and The Jungle Book, an updated release of Disney Classic Games: Aladdin and The Lion King, which was scheduled to be released for the Nintendo Switch, PlayStation 4, Windows, and Xbox One on November 9, 2021, before being delayed and released later on November 23.

== See also ==
- List of Disney video games
