= That's What Friends Are For (The Vulture Song) =

1967 song from the Walt Disney film The Jungle Book

- Quartet of mop top vultures

Song by J. Pat O'Malley, Lord Tim Hudson, Digby Wolfe, and Chad Stuart

from the album The Jungle Book
- Released: 1967
- Genre: Barbershop
- Length: 2:04
- Label: Disney
- Songwriter: Robert and Richard Sherman

"That's What Friends Are For (The Vulture Song)" is a song in the Walt Disney film The Jungle Book from 1967. It was sung by a quartet of "mop top" vultures who are making friends with Mowgli, the main character of the film. The song was written by Disney staff songwriters, Robert and Richard Sherman, and sung primarily by J. Pat O'Malley, Lord Tim Hudson, Digby Wolfe, and Chad Stuart. Bruce Reitherman and George Sanders both made cameo appearances in the song singing as Mowgli and Shere Khan the tiger, respectively, in different parts. In the soundtrack album, The Mellomen member Bill Lee replaced the unavailable Sanders, a trained bass singer.

== Composing ==
The Shermans were brought onto the film by Walt Disney, who felt that the film in keeping with Rudyard Kipling's book was too dark for family viewing. In a deliberate effort to keep the score light, this song as well as the Sherman Brothers' other contributions to the score generally concern darker subject matter than the accompanying music would suggest. In the case of "That's What Friends Are For", the vultures sing in the style of a barbershop quartet, making their song endearing to Mowgli - and that much more dangerous. The lyrics feature many double entendres regarding how the vultures eat other animals. The song was originally conceived as a rock and roll song, sung by the quartet of vultures. The vultures appear to be based on The Beatles, with moptop haircuts and mock-Liverpool accents. But while there have been rumors over the years of The Beatles being asked to voice the vultures, there is no actual proof of the band being given an offer. During production Disney decided the 1960s style rock would cause the song to be considered dated later, leading "We're Your Friends" to be changed to the barbershop quartet that appears in the film.
