= The Young Messiah (soundtrack) =

The Young Messiah (Original Motion Picture Soundtrack)

Film score by John Debney
- Released: March 11, 2016
- Recorded: 2015–2016
- Studios: AIR Studios, London
- Genre: Film score
- Length: 69:42
- Label: Lakeshore
- Producer: John Debney

John Debney chronology
| Broken Horses (2015) | The Young Messiah (2016) | The Jungle Book (2016) |

The Young Messiah (Original Motion Picture Soundtrack) is the soundtrack to the 2016 film of the same name directed by Cyrus Nowrasteh. The film's original score is composed by John Debney and released through Lakeshore Records on March 11, 2016.

== Development ==
On January 17, 2013, John Debney was hired to score music for The Young Messiah. He previously associated with Nowrasteh on The Stoning of Soraya M. (2009). Due to his familiarity with the source material—Anne Rice's Christ the Lord: Out of Egypt, on which the film is based—and Nowrasteh's elaboration of the script had him interested as it had scope and potential for music. One of the scenes where Jesus' mother Mary is sitting with "him" under a tree and trying to figure out who "he" is, has been described as "heart-touching" and "beautifully written", according to Debney, which confirmed his involvement.

For the film score, Debney felt that he wanted to revisit the sounds he curated to The Passion of the Christ to capture the ethnicity and authenticity of that film, analyzing the specific instrumentation and soundscape. In contrast to The Passion, he wanted the score to be emotionally uplifting, where it was not to be "too ponderous and heavy" but should be emotionally connected with the audience. The musical score consisted of Middle Eastern influences with percussions and orchestral elements. Due to the film's short budget, much of the score had been recorded at the AIR Studios in London, with sessions organized with his close collaborators.

== Critical reception ==
Pete Simons of Synchrotones wrote "The gently swaying rhythms, the warm strings and the occasional solos for duduk or cello all contribute to an pleasant and easy-going listening experience." Hannah Goodwyn of Christian Broadcasting Network wrote "Oscar-nominated composer John Debney's score is transporting." Rose Pacatte of National Catholic Reporter wrote "The score beautifully enhances the film." Linda Cook of Quad-City Times wrote "John Debney's lush score creates an atmosphere of reverence."

== Track listing ==
| No. | Title | Length |
|---|---|---|
| 1. | "The Young Messiah Theme" (feat. Bethany Woods) | 2:36 |
| 2. | "Alexandria Egypt" | 5:23 |
| 3. | "Salome Reminds Jesus" | 1:47 |
| 4. | "Jesus Heals Eleazer" | 2:52 |
| 5. | "Herod Is Dead" | 2:18 |
| 6. | "Mary and Joseph / Don't You See Him?" | 2:20 |
| 7. | "The Carved Camel" | 1:09 |
| 8. | "Jesus Encounters Romans" | 2:08 |
| 9. | "Severus Lets Jesus' Family Go" | 1:56 |
| 10. | "Herod Reprimands Severus" | 2:39 |
| 11. | "Jesus Heals Cleopus" | 3:07 |
| 12. | "Rape Victim" | 1:15 |
| 13. | "Sister, Come to Nazareth" | 2:08 |
| 14. | "Not Just a Child / Crucifixes" | 4:13 |
| 15. | "Reveal of Nazareth" | 1:33 |
| 16. | "The Messiah Will Save Us!" | 1:16 |
| 17. | "A Son Named Jesus" | 4:27 |
| 18. | "Jerusalem for Passover" | 2:35 |
| 19. | "Travel to Jerusalem" | 1:51 |
| 20. | "Mary Presents Baby Jesus" | 1:03 |
| 21. | "Jesus Leaves Alone" | 2:26 |
| 22. | "He Wants Answers" | 2:25 |
| 23. | "He's in the Temple" | 1:25 |
| 24. | "Herod's Rage" | 0:56 |
| 25. | "The Blind Rabbi" | 6:17 |
| 26. | "Mary Reveals the Truth to Jesus / Jesus Talks to God" | 7:37 |
| Total length: | | 69:42 |

== Personnel ==
Credits adapted from liner notes:

- Music composer, producer, programmer – John Debney
- Music producer – Dan Savant
- Recording and mixing – Simon Rhodes
- A&R director – Eric Craig
- Art direction – John Bergin
- Liner notes – Cyrus Nowrasteh

Orchestra

- Orchestrator, conductor and copyist – Kevin Kaska
- Orchestra contractor – Isobel Griffiths
- Concertmaster – Perry Montague-Mason

Instruments

- Cello – Josephine Knight
- Electric cello – John Debney
- Oud – Michael Allaf
- Percussion – MB Gordy, John Debney
- Vocals – Bethany Woods
- Woodwinds – Pedro Eustache
