= Jungle Book (video game) =

- Developer: Powerhouse Entertainment
- Publisher: IBM
- Platform: Windows
- Release: March 1996
- Genre: Adventure

Jungle Book is a 1996 video game developed by Powerhouse Entertainment and published by IBM. It is based on the 1994 film The Jungle Book.

== Gameplay ==
The gameplay centers on the player taking the role of Mowgli and progressing through a series of interactive challenges. The player is guided by Colonel Ilgwom while navigating dangerous areas, avoiding hazards, and overcoming obstacles to advance toward the main objective. The player must outwit hostile soldiers, steer clear of perilous locations such as the animal boneyard, and avoid dead ends while searching for King Louie's crown. Once found, the player must return the crown to King Louie in Monkey City.

== Development ==
Jungle Book was developed by Powerhouse Entertainment, a company founded in 1995. Jungle Book uses Powerhouse Entertainment's FastLANE technology. To create "The Jungle Book," Powerhouse waded through 80 hours of original scenes and outtakes from the movie, used original film props and shot 20 days of additional blue screen and location footage. It was released in March 1996.

== Reception ==
Reception

Review scores
| Publication | Score |
|---|---|
| Entertainment Weekly | B |
| PC Zone | 7/10 |
| USA Today | 2.5/5 |

Entertainment Weekly liked the wide-screen scenarios and vibrant jungle backdrops. The New York Times called Jungle Book intermittently engaging.

Jungle Book was named one of the top 100 CD-ROMs by PC Magazine.
