= Bill Lee (singer) =

American playback singer (1916–1980)

- Lee in Cinderella (1965)

Background information
- Born: William Lee; August 21, 1916; Johnson, Nebraska, U.S.
- Died: November 15, 1980 (aged 64) Los Angeles, California, U.S.
- Occupation: Playback singer
- Years active: 1948–1977

William Lee (August 21, 1916 – November 15, 1980) was an American playback singer who provided a voice or singing voice in many films, for actors in musicals and for many Disney characters.

== Biography ==
Lee was born on August 21, 1916, in Johnson, Nebraska, and grew up in Des Moines, Iowa. His initial musical focus was as a trombone player, but after singing in several college vocal groups, he decided to concentrate on his voice. He served as an ensign in the United States Navy during World War II, then moved to Hollywood upon discharge. The bulk of Lee's income consisted of singing commercials for radio and television, much of which Lee felt was "silly" but he appreciated the financial independence this work gave him. He sang the lead role in a 1953 Gordon Jenkins made-for-record musical entitled Seven Dreams.

Much of Lee's best-known work is as part of the popular singing quartet known as The Mellomen, founded by Thurl Ravenscroft. It was Lee, rather than Ravenscroft, who provided Shere Khan's sung line during "That's What Friends Are For" in The Jungle Book. Richard M. Sherman confirmed this fact on the audio commentary on its 2007 DVD release. Though George Sanders, Shere Khan's voice actor, was an accomplished singer, he was not available during the finalized recording of the song.

Lee performed prolifically for The Walt Disney Company. Initially his Disney efforts were as part of The Mellomen, but he was later given many solos on Disneyland Records. For the million-selling second-cast Disneyland album of Mary Poppins, Lee performs as Bert and Mr. Banks. In the film itself, Lee sang as one of the barnyard menagerie in "Jolly Holiday". He has appeared as Goofy in the 1965 LP Children's Riddles and Game Songs. At the Disney theme parks, he is the voice of Melvin the moose in Country Bear Jamboree. Lee also sang the Bat Masterson theme song from the popular television series.

Lee also provided the singing voice for John Kerr in South Pacific, Christopher Plummer in The Sound of Music, and John Gavin in Thoroughly Modern Millie.

Lee died of a brain tumor on November 15, 1980, in Los Angeles, California.

== Partial filmography ==
- Words and Music (1948) - singing voice for Tom Drake
- Alice in Wonderland (1951) - Card Painter, a member of The Mellomen
- Peter Pan (1953) - Pirates (singing voice)
- Seven Brides for Seven Brothers (1954) - Caleb Pontipee (singing voice)
- Lady and the Tramp (1955) - Dog, as a member of The Mellomen
- Zorro (1957-1959) - Diego de la Vega (singing voice)
- South Pacific (1958) - Lieutenant Joseph Cable (singing voice)
- Bat Masterson (1958-1961) - Theme song vocalist
- One Hundred and One Dalmatians (1961) - Roger (singing voice)
- Snow White and the Three Stooges (1961) - Quatro/Prince Charming (singing voice)
- The Alvin Show (1961-1962) - Additional voices
- Gay Purr-ee (1962) - Hench Cat (singing voice)
- Hey There, It's Yogi Bear! (1964) - Yogi Bear (singing voice)
- Mary Poppins (1964) - Ram (singing voice)
- Cinderella (1965) - Father
- Tom and Jerry (1965–1972) - (singing voice)
- The Sound of Music (1965) - Captain von Trapp (singing voice)
- The Jungle Book (1967) - Singing elephant, Shere Khan (singing voice)
- Thoroughly Modern Millie (1967) - Trevor Graydon (singing voice)
- Winnie the Pooh and the Blustery Day (1968) - Honeypot Quartet, as a member of The Mellomen
- Horton Hears a Who! (1970) - Wickersham Brother (singing voice, as a member of The Mellomen)
- Charlotte's Web (1973) - Singer
- The Hobbit (1977) - Goblin (singing voice)
