= My Own Home =

"My Own Home" is a song from the Walt Disney film, The Jungle Book, from 1967. The song was sung by Darleen Carr playing the part of the girl from the Man Village (later named Shanti in 2003's The Jungle Book 2). The song was written by Disney staff songwriters, Robert and Richard Sherman. This song serves as the basis for the Sarah Brightman song "On the Nile" and was sampled in the Slum Dogz song "The Jungle Book".

"The native girl sings "My Own Home" as Mowgli watches. Singer Darleen Carr was at the Disney Studio filming Monkeys, Go Home, and we asked her to record a demo of our new song. Walt (Disney) loved the demo, and many months later, when director Woolie Reitherman said 'We need to find a voice for the girl,' Walt, with his infallible memory, replied, 'You've already got her!'"

== Composition ==
The Shermans were brought onto the film by Walt Disney, who thought that the film in keeping with Rudyard Kipling's book was too dark for family viewing. In a deliberate effort to keep the score light, this song as well as the Sherman Brothers' other contributions to the score generally concern darker subject matter than the accompanying music would suggest. The song was described as a "siren song" with Indian overtones. Composer George Bruns also included cues of "My Own Home" in the soundtrack to foreshadow its appearance at the end of the film.
