= Trust in Me (The Python's Song) =

Song written by Richard Sherman and Robert Sherman

Song by Sterling Holloway

from the album The Jungle Book
- Released: 1967
- Length: 1:30
- Label: Disneyland
- Songwriter: Richard and Robert Sherman

"Trust in Me (The Python's Song)" is a song in the popular Walt Disney film The Jungle Book, from 1967. The song was sung by Sterling Holloway playing the part of Kaa, the snake. The song was written by Disney staff songwriters Robert and Richard Sherman. In the song, Kaa quickly hypnotizes Mowgli into a calm, soothing, relaxing trance, sending Mowgli sleepwalking along his body until he finally coils himself around Mowgli just like he did before. As the song concludes, Kaa readies himself to devour the boy, only to be stopped by Shere Khan the tiger in his search for Mowgli.

== Composition ==
The Shermans were brought onto the film by Walt Disney, who felt that the film in keeping with Rudyard Kipling's book was too dark for family viewing. In a deliberate effort to keep the score light, this song as well as the Sherman Brothers' other contributions to the score generally concern darker subject matter than the accompanying music would suggest. "Trust in Me" originated from Disney's suggestion to add a song to Kaa's sequence, and was written by the Shermans based on "The Land of Sand", a song they had composed for 1964's Mary Poppins that ended up not being used. Kaa speaks and sings with a subtle, lilting lisp, giving the song a humorous dimension that it would not otherwise have.

== Cover versions ==
The song was covered by acts such as Siouxsie and the Banshees and Scarlett Johansson. Siouxsie and the Banshees performed the song on their 1987 cover album Through the Looking Glass. Sounds praised this non-traditional version as "quite astonishing. Whereas once it was about a python getting ready to crush a little boy to death, now it's a harp-laden lullaby of rampant, swirling eroticism". The 2016 live-action adaptation of The Jungle Book featured a version in the end credits produced by Mark Ronson and sung by Scarlett Johansson, who played Kaa in the film.
