= The Jungle Book Groove Party =

2000 video game

- Reissued European PlayStation 2 box art
- Developers: Ubi Soft Montreal; Ubi Soft Shanghai
- Publisher: Ubi Soft (Note: Sony Computer Entertainment Europe and Disney Interactive published the PlayStation and Microsoft Windows versions in Europe, respectively.)
- Platforms: Microsoft Windows, PlayStation, PlayStation 2
- Release: Windows; 2000; PlayStation 2: EU: April 6, 2001

The Jungle Book Groove Party (also known as The Jungle Book Rhythm n'Groove in North America) is a 2000 music rhythm video game developed by Ubi Soft Montreal and Ubi Soft Shanghai, and published by Ubi Soft for Microsoft Windows, PlayStation, and PlayStation 2. Featuring similar gameplay to the Dance Dance Revolution series, the game features characters and songs from Disney's film The Jungle Book (1967). The game was packaged with a dance pad.

== Gameplay ==
The Jungle Book Groove Party loosely follows the story of The Jungle Book film, going through Mowgli's journey to the Man Village and the creatures he encounters along the way. The game is played in the style of Dance Dance Revolution with some differences, and can be played with either a standard controller or a dance pad. Arrows come down the top of the screen and the player must step on the corresponding arrow in time to the music. Missing arrows cause the fruit at the top of the screen to turn yellow and disappear, with the game ending if all pieces of fruit are lost. Power-ups can be activated by entering input commands in between arrows. These range from beneficial bonuses, such as point multipliers or automatically clearing arrows, to offensive items that hinder the opponent, such as blocking their view. The story mode takes Mowgli through nine levels, including two boss levels. The game also features a two-player mode allowing two players to battle against each other.

== Songs ==
Some songs such as "The Bare Necessities" and "I Wan'na Be Like You" are from the original film; the new songs were written by Nicolas Maranda, who also arranged all the songs. A cover of "I Wan'na Be Like You" performed by German singer Lou Bega can be unlocked by playing through the game:

- "The Jungle's No Place for a Boy" - performed by Bagheera
- "Join the Ranks" - performed by Hathi and Junior
- "The Bare Necessities" - performed by Baloo
- "Go Bananas in the Coconut Tree" - performed by the Monkeys
- "I Wan'na Be Like You" - performed by King Louie
- "A Mood for Food" - performed by Kaa
- "We Are the Vultures" - performed by the Vultures
- "Run" - performed by Shere Khan
- "A Brand New Day" - performed by Shanti
- "I Wan'na Be Like You" - performed by Lou Bega

== Reception ==
Reception

Aggregate scores
Aggregator	Score
GameRankings	(PS2) 63.47% (PS) 58.00%
Metacritic	(PS2) 56/100

The Jungle Book Groove Party received mixed reviews. Aggregating review website GameRankings and Metacritic gave the PlayStation 2 version 63.47% and 56/100. and the PlayStation version 58.00%.
