= Digby Wolfe =

British actor, television writer, and presenter (1929–2012)

- Born: James Digby Wolfe; 4 June 1929; London, England
- Died: 2 May 2012 (aged 82); Albuquerque, New Mexico, US
- Occupations: Actor, television writer, television personality
- Years active: 1948–2002
- Spouse: Patricia Mannion

James Digby Wolfe (4 June 1929 – 2 May 2012) was an English actor, comedian, television writer, and presenter, who worked variously in the United Kingdom, Australia, and United States. He was best known for his work on the sketch comedy programs That Was the Week That Was and Rowan & Martin's Laugh-In, and was both a Primetime Emmy and Logie Award recipient.

== Early life ==
James Digby Wolfe was born to a father who was an international banker and a mother who was a Vogue magazine artist. His mother named him after a character in Beau Geste. When he was four, his father died after having been hit by a golf ball, and he was brought up by his mother in Felixstowe.

== Film and television career ==
He made his film debut in the 1948 film The Weaker Sex. He began writing and performing in comedy series in England in the 1950s. Together with Jimmy Wilson he wrote a revue, with music by John Pritchett and Norman Dannatt, for the Irving Theatre. He appeared alongside Ronnie Corbett, Hattie Jacques and Charles Hawtrey, in his own television show Wolfe at the Door before moving to Sydney, Australia in 1959, where he made frequent television appearances and was host of the variety shows, Revue '61 and Revue '62.

At that time, his resident comedian was Dave Allen, who later became a household name in the UK and Australia. Wolfe returned to England for a while in the early 1960s and was a writer on the seminal television satirical review That Was the Week That Was. He also taught screenwriting at USC in the MPW (Master of Professional Writing) program.

== Career in the US ==
In 1964, he moved to the United States, where his television credits included The Monkees, Bewitched, I Dream of Jeannie, and The Munsters, while his film roles included voice parts in The Jungle Book and Father Goose, in which he sang the main theme. His writing credits included Rowan & Martin's Laugh-In (for which he won an Emmy in 1968; comedian John Barbour credits Wolfe with coining the term "laugh-in"), and The Goldie Hawn Special. He also wrote for John Denver, Shirley MacLaine, Cher and Jackie Mason, among others. In 1976 he hosted two episodes of the Australian version of This Is Your Life.

== Later life and death ==
Until 2002, Wolfe taught dramatic writing at the University of New Mexico, first as a visiting professor, then as the chair of the Robert Hartung Dramatic Writing Program in the Theatre and Dance Department. He was awarded 'Teacher of the Year' at that university in 2001.

Wolfe died in Albuquerque, New Mexico, aged 82, on 3 May 2012, after a short battle with cancer, and was survived by his wife, Patricia Mannion, and his sister, Hilary Hammond-Williams.

== Publications ==
- Walking on Fire: The Shaping Force of Emotion in Writing Drama by Digby Wolfe and Jim Linnell, published by Southern Illinois University Press.

== Filmography ==
- The Weaker Sex (1948) – Benjie Dacre
- The Guinea Pig (1948) – (uncredited)
- Adam and Evalyn (1949) – Undetermined Supporting Role (uncredited)
- Landfall (1949) – Pinsley (uncredited)
- Stage Fright (1950) – Assistant Stage Manager (uncredited)
- The Dark Man (1951) – Young Man at Party
- Worm's Eye View (1951) – Cpl. Mark Trelawney
- Little Big Shot (1952) – Peter Carton
- For Better, for Worse (1954) – Grocer's Assistant
- Tale of Three Women (1954) – Brightwell (segment "Final Twist' story)
- The Big Money (1956) – Harry Mason
- The Jungle Book (1967) – Ziggy, The Vulture (voice, uncredited) (final film role)

== Television ==
Year	Title	Role	Notes
1967	The Monkees	Man with Paper	S1:E29, "Monkees Get Out More Dirt"
