= Colonel Hathi's March (The Elephant Song) =

Song in the 1967 film, The Jungle Book

"Colonel Hathi's March (The Elephant Song)" is a song in the 1967 Walt Disney film, The Jungle Book. The song was sung by J. Pat O'Malley, playing the part of "Colonel Hathi". The song was also sung by Thurl Ravenscroft and The Mellomen, originally Terry-Thomas and Disney Chorus. The song was written by Disney staff songwriters, Robert and Richard Sherman to a tune strongly derived from the chorus of the song On the Road to Mandalay. It is written in the spirit of a light commentary on the pointlessness of constant military drilling. A reprise version has the first appearance of Shere Khan.

== Composition ==
The Shermans were brought onto the film by Walt Disney, who felt that the film in keeping with Rudyard Kipling's book was too dark for family viewing. In a deliberate effort to keep the score light, this song as well as the Sherman Brothers' other contributions to the score generally concern darker subject matter than the accompanying music would suggest. "Colonel Hathi's March" was the first song written by the siblings. As the elephants were "big clunky animals, crushing everything as they march through", the Shermans thought the best song for them would be a "heavy and ponderous" military march, with feeble lyrics only describing how the platoon tramples what is in its path.

== See also ==
- On the Road to Mandalay (song) – song set to a Kipling poem
