= The Mellomen =

American singing group

- Genres: Capella; Pop; Jazz; Film Score
- Instruments: A capella, Bass, Baritone
- Years active: Late-1940’s — Mid-1970’s
- Labels: Disneyland Records; Word Records; RCA Records; Capitol Records; Sacred Records; Columbia Records; Decca Records; Coral Records; MGM Records; Allied Record; Philips Records; Brunswick Records; Vik Records; Fraternity Records; Rakrik Records; Viking Records; MCA Records; His Master's Voice; Colpix Records; Ekko Records; Coronet Records
- Past members: Thurl Ravenscroft; Bill Lee; Bob Hamlin; Bob Stevens; Bill Cole; Max Smith; Gene Merlino

The Mellomen were a popular singing quartet active from the late 1940s through the mid-1970s. The group was founded by Thurl Ravenscroft and Max Smith in 1948. They recorded under a variety of names, including Big John and the Buzzards, the Crackerjacks, the Lee Brothers, and the Ravenscroft Quartet. They were sometimes credited as the Mellowmen, the Mello Men, or the Mellow Men. They sang backup to some of the best-known artists of the day, including Rosemary Clooney, Bing Crosby, Doris Day, Arlo Guthrie, Frankie Laine, Peggy Lee, Elvis Presley, and Jo Stafford.

In addition to backing up popular singers, they also were featured vocalists for bandleaders such as Spike Jones and their solo work is part of many Disney films including Alice in Wonderland, Peter Pan, Lady and the Tramp and The Jungle Book as well as numerous animated shorts, including Trick or Treat (1952), Pigs Is Pigs (1954), Paul Bunyan (1958), and Noah's Ark (1959). Their work for Disney also led to numerous television appearances, beginning with the Disneyland television show episode Cavalcade of Songs, originally broadcast February 16, 1955. The Mellomen were also featured frequently on Disneyland Records, which released their 1957 album Meet Me Down on Main Street. They also sang "The Scarecrow of Romney Marsh" theme and the introduction of Zorro. Henry Calvin, who portrayed Sergeant Garcia on that television series, also sang and released a version of the "Zorro" theme song. (A longer version of the "Zorro Theme", recorded by the female quartet, the Chordettes, became a top ten hit in the US). The quartet also appeared in a 1959 episode of the television situation comedy Love and Marriage and performed singing voices for the elephants along with J. Pat O'Malley in the 1967 movie The Jungle Book. The group were also the "singing busts" in the graveyard of Disneyland's Haunted Mansion attraction, and sang the recording of "Yo Ho (A Pirate's Life for Me)" used in Disneyland's Pirates of the Caribbean attraction.

The Mellomen were also featured in the UPA animated feature Gay Purr-ee which starred Judy Garland as the voice of a beautiful cat named Mewsette and included songs by Harold Arlen and Yip Harburg. The film was released by Warner Bros. in 1962. In addition, they sang on several films with Elvis Presley, beginning with It Happened at the World's Fair. Elvis wanted the Jordanaires to perform for the film but they were unavailable, so the Mellomen were called in to sing "One Broken Heart For Sale" and "Cotton Candy Land". The Mellomen later backed up Elvis on the title song for the film Roustabout as well as on most of the sound track for Paradise, Hawaiian Style. In 1969, the Mellomen appeared with Elvis in the film The Trouble with Girls, as a gospel group called the Bible Singers.

== Members ==
- Thurl Ravenscroft (bass)
- Bill Lee (baritone)
- Bob Hamlin (lead tenor, 1948–1955)
- Bob Stevens (lead tenor, 1955–1961)
- Bill Cole (lead tenor, 1961–1970s)
- Max Smith (2nd tenor, 1948–1966)
- Gene Merlino (2nd tenor, 1966–1970s)

== Filmography ==
- Alice in Wonderland (1951): Card Painters
- El Dorado (1966): Backup group to George Alexander
- The Hobbit (1977): Goblins
- The Many Adventures of Winnie the Pooh (1977): Honeypot Quartet
- The Jungle Book (1967): The Dawn Patrol
- Halloween Is Grinch Night (1977): Singing Monsters
- Horton Hears a Who! (1970): Wickersham Brothers
- Davy Crockett (1954-1955): Chorus
- Zorro (1957): Chorus
- Lady and the Tramp (1955): Dogs in Pound
- Toot, Whistle, Plunk and Boom (1953): Cavemen
- Gay Purr-ee (1962): The Shadow Cats
- The Trouble With Girls (1969): The Bible Singers
- Trick or Treat (1952): Singing Ghosts
- Winnie the Pooh and the Blustery Day (1968): Honeypot Quartet
- Peter Pan (1953): The Pirates and The Indians

== Sources ==
- "The Mellomen" at All Things Thurl (an authorized fan site, to which Thurl Ravenscroft contributed)
- Elvis's Backup Singers
