= The Jungle Book 2 =

2003 Disney animated film by Steve Trenbirth

- Theatrical release poster
- Directed by: Steve Trenbirth
- Written by: Karl Geurs; Evan Spiliotopoulos
- Produced by: Mary Thorne; Christopher Chase
- Starring: Haley Joel Osment; John Goodman; Mae Whitman; Bob Joles; Tony Jay; Phil Collins; John Rhys-Davies; Jim Cummings
- Edited by: Christopher K. Gee; Peter Lonsdale
- Music by: Joel McNeely
- Production company: DisneyToon Studios (Note: Animation outsourced to Walt Disney Animation Australia.)
- Distributed by: Buena Vista Pictures Distribution (Note: Distributed through the Walt Disney Pictures banner.)
- Release date: February 14, 2003
- Running time: 72 minutes
- Countries: United States; Australia
- Language: English
- Budget: $20 million
- Box office: $135.7 million

The Jungle Book 2 is a 2003 animated adventure film produced by the Australian office at DisneyToon Studios and released by Walt Disney Pictures and Buena Vista Distribution. The film was released in France on February 5, 2003, and released in the United States on February 14.

The film is a sequel to Walt Disney's 1967 film The Jungle Book, and stars Haley Joel Osment as the voice of Mowgli and John Goodman as the voice of Baloo.

The film was originally produced as a direct-to-video film, but was released theatrically first, similar to the Peter Pan sequel Return to Never Land. It is the fourth animated Disney sequel to have a theatrical release rather than going direct-to-video after The Rescuers Down Under (1990), Fantasia 2000 (1999), and Return to Never Land (2002) and the last one until Ralph Breaks the Internet (2018). The film is not based on The Second Jungle Book, but they do have several characters in common.

The film received negative reviews criticizing the animation and plot, but it was a box office success, grossing $135.7 million against a $20 million budget.

== Plot ==
Following the events of the previous film, Mowgli now resides in the "Man-Village" with Shanti, the girl who lured him into the village, having been adopted by the village leader, who has a wife named Messua and a son named Ranjan. However, wanting to return to the exciting life of the jungle, Mowgli nearly leads the other children in the village across the river, against the instruction of the village leader, who punishes Mowgli for disobeying him and putting the other children in danger by sending him to his room without dinner.

Meanwhile, in the jungle, Baloo starts to feel lonely and misses Mowgli. He goes to the Man-Village to get Mowgli, but Bagheera, alongside Colonel Hathi and his herd, tries to keep him away from there. Shere Khan has returned to Baloo and Bagheera's area of the jungle, seeking revenge on Mowgli for defeating him earlier, much to the vultures' surprise along with their new member Lucky.

Later that night Baloo gets to the Man-Village and takes Mowgli back into the jungle; unbeknownst to them, Shere Khan had also entered the village looking for Mowgli, only to be attacked by the villagers. In the ensuing chase, Shanti and Ranjan sneak into the jungle to rescue Mowgli, believing that Baloo is a rabid animal who has kidnapped him. Kaa attempts to eat Mowgli while he obliviously sings with Baloo, only to be inadvertently injured by them with prickly pears. After swearing off associating with humans again, Kaa comes across and hypnotizes Shanti, whom he tries to eat only to be hit with a stick by Ranjan and scared off a cliff.

Bagheera learns of Mowgli's escape from the village when the humans search the jungle for him (which causes many animals including Hathi and his herd to be scared) and immediately suspects Baloo. Mowgli instructs Baloo to scare off Shanti should she appear, and bemoans his boring life in the Man-Village. Baloo and Mowgli journey to King Louie's old temple (King Louie having moved out) for a party. When the jungle animals mock Shanti and other aspects of Mowgli's life in the Man-Village, Mowgli angrily leaves. He finds Shanti and Ranjan, but Baloo scares Shanti. When the truth comes out that Mowgli ordered Baloo to scare her, Shanti and Ranjan run away, abandoning Mowgli.

Baloo realizes that Mowgli misses his village life, but when Mowgli tries to reconnect with his human friends, they are cornered by Shere Khan, who chases Mowgli and Shanti to an abandoned temple built above a lake of lava. Baloo instructs Bagheera to protect Ranjan while he goes to save Mowgli and Shanti. After confusing Shere Khan by banging several different gongs, Shanti's presence is revealed to Shere Khan. Baloo tackles Shere Khan to the ground, allowing Mowgli and Shanti enough time to escape, but the tiger chases them to a statue across a pit of lava. Shere Khan is trapped within the statue's mouth, and it plummets onto a large stone in the lava below.

With Shere Khan finally thwarted, Baloo decides to let Mowgli return to the Man-Village with Shanti and Ranjan, and Bagheera proudly compliments Baloo for making a wise decision. Upon returning to the Man-Village, Mowgli reconciles with the village leader, who apologizes to Mowgli for failing to understand that the jungle was part of his identity. Mowgli embraces his new life in the Man-Village, and the children return daily to visit Baloo and Bagheera in the jungle.

== Voice cast ==
- Haley Joel Osment as Mowgli, a young boy raised in the jungle, who wants to return there. Jake Thomas auditioned for the role prior to Osment's casting.
- John Goodman as Baloo, a fun-loving sloth bear who is Mowgli's best friend.
- Mae Whitman as Shanti, a young girl who is Mowgli's love interest.
- Bob Joles as Bagheera, a black panther and Mowgli's friend, who is determined to stop Baloo from getting Mowgli out of his village.
- Tony Jay as Shere Khan, a man-eating Bengal tiger who wants revenge on Mowgli.
- Phil Collins as Lucky, a dim-witted vulture who mocks Shere Khan.
- John Rhys-Davies as the Village Leader, the stern yet responsible ruler of the Man-Village who serves as Mowgli's adoptive father.
- Veena Bidasha as Messua, the Village Leader's wife who serves as Mowgli's adoptive mother.
- Connor Funk as Ranjan, the son of Messua and the Village Leader who serves as Mowgli's adoptive brother.
- Jim Cummings as Kaa / Colonel Hathi / M.C. Monkey.
- Jimmy Bennett as Hathi Jr.
- Jeff Glen Bennett as Buzzie.
- Brian Cummings as Flaps.
- Jess Harnell as Dizzy and Ziggy.

Additional voices are provided by J. Grant Albrecht, Jeff Bennett, Brian Cummings, Baron Davis, Jess Harnell, and Devika Parikh.

== Songs ==
Songs from the first film were composed by Terry Gilkyson and Richard M. and Robert B. Sherman with new songs by Lorraine Feather, Paul Grabowsky, and Joel McNeely. Marty Stuart reportedly submitted songs for the film during production.

1. "I Wan'na Be like You" – Smash Mouth
2. "Jungle Rhythm" – Mowgli, Shanti, Ranjan
3. "The Bare Necessities" – Baloo
4. "Colonel Hathi's March"
5. "The Bare Necessities" – Baloo, Mowgli
6. "W-I-L-D" – Baloo
7. "Jungle Rhythm (Reprise)" – Mowgli
8. "The Bear Necessities (Reprise)" – Baloo, Mowgli, Shanti
9. "Right Where I Belong" – Windy Wagner

== Production ==
In the 1990s, screenwriting duo Bob Hilgenberg and Rob Muir submitted a Jungle Book 2 screenplay in which Baloo ventured to save his romantic interest from a poacher. Disney ultimately went in a different direction for the sequel.

John Goodman recorded his voice work in New Orleans while Haley Joel Osment recorded his in California. Due to a legal dispute, the character of King Louie from the original Jungle Book could not be included in this film. However, he makes a non-physical appearance as a shadow puppet in the beginning of the film and is briefly mentioned in the middle of the film. The decision was made to keep Shere Khan in shadow during the beginning of the film to "reflect his 'wounded pride'".

The film was originally intended to be released straight-to-video but in February 2002, Disney announced that the film, as well as Piglet's Big Movie would be released theatrically. The film was given a theatrical release in all territories except in Japan.

== Reception ==
=== Critical reception ===
The Jungle Book 2 received generally negative reviews from critics. On review aggregator website Rotten Tomatoes, the film received an approval rating of 19% based on 90 reviews with an average rating of 4.4/10. The site's critical consensus reads: "This inferior rehash of The Jungle Book should have gone straight to video". On Metacritic, the film has a weighted average score of 38 out of 100 based on 24 critics, indicating "generally unfavorable reviews". Audiences polled by CinemaScore gave the film an average grade of "A−" on an A+ to F scale.

=== Box office ===
The film was released on February 14, 2003 and opened at #4 in its 4-day opening weekend with $14,109,797. At the end of its run, the film grossed $47,901,582 in the United States and $87,802,017 in foreign countries totaling $135,703,599 worldwide. It could be considered a box office success, based on its $20 million budget.

=== Home media ===
The Jungle Book 2 was released on both VHS and DVD on June 10, 2003. The bonus features included the behind-the-scenes, some music videos, "W-I-L-D", "I Wan'na Be like You" and "Jungle Rhythm", and deleted scenes. It was rereleased on June 17, 2008 as a "Special Edition" DVD with additional bonus features. In the United States, the 2008 DVD release sold 126,593 units and grossed $1.83 million in two weeks. The film was first released on Blu-ray on March 18, 2014; a Blu-ray release was also included as part of the Disney Legacy Animated Film Collection on November 14, 2023. As of 2024, an unlimited DVD/Blu-ray release of this film has yet to be announced.

== Cancelled sequel and TV series ==
In 2003, a third installment to The Jungle Book was planned. It would have been about Baloo and Shere Khan being captured and sold off to a Russian circus, and Mowgli, Shanti, Ranjan, and Bagheera deciding to save them both. Over the course of the film, Shere Khan regrets his hatred against humanity after the events of the previous two films because of his capture, and eventually reforms after Mowgli and his friends rescued them. The project was never materialized and has yet to be reinstated due to Tony Jay's death in 2006. Before the movie was released a TV series taking place after the movie was pitched by John Fountain and was called Mowgli and Baloo's Jungle Jams which was to be shown in the style of the comic strip Calvin and Hobbes but it was never accepted.
