= King Louie =

Character from The Jungle Book

- The Jungle Book character
- King Louie singing "I Wan'na Be Like You".
- First appearance: The Jungle Book (1967)
- Created by: Milt Kahl, Frank Thomas, John Lounsbery, and Walt Disney
- Voiced by: Louis Prima (The Jungle Book); Jim Cummings (TaleSpin, Jungle Cubs (as an adult), The Jungle Book Groove Party, 1990-present); Jason Marsden (Jungle Cubs season 1); Cree Summer (Jungle Cubs season 2); Christopher Walken (2016 live-action film)

In-universe information
- Species: Bornean orangutan Indopithecus (2016 film)
- Gender: Male

King Louie is a fictional character introduced in Walt Disney's animated musical film The Jungle Book. He is a Bornean orangutan who leads other jungle primates, and wants to become more human-like by gaining knowledge of fire from Mowgli. King Louie is an original character not featured in Rudyard Kipling's original works.

The filmmakers originally considered Louis Armstrong for the role, but fearing the controversy that might result from casting a black person as an ape or a monkey, they instead chose Italian American and fellow New Orleans native Louis Prima. Prima considered playing King Louie as one of the highlights of his career, and felt he had become "immortal" thanks to Walt Disney and the entire studio.

King Louie was barred from appearing in Disney productions following a legal dispute with Prima's widow, Gia Maione, in 2002. After Maione died in 2013, the dispute ended and Louie was allowed to appear in the 2016 film, The Jungle Book, where he was voiced by Christopher Walken, and changed to a Gigantopithecus.

== The Jungle Book (1967) ==
Although the Disney adaptation is based on the Kipling stories, the character King Louie does not appear in Rudyard Kipling's original book, as orangutans are not native to India in real life. Kipling also states in the original that the Bandar-log, the monkeys and Hoolock gibbons over which King Louie rules in the film, have no effective leadership, let alone a king. In the book, Mowgli is abducted by a band of unidentified, leaderless Bandar-log monkeys and gibbons.

Bill Peet's original story for the film did not feature King Louie but did feature a larger primate without a tail. Peet left The Walt Disney Company on January 29, 1964, due to a dispute regarding the contents of his script, so his ultimate vision for the king of the Bandar-log remains unknown. Development of the story continued following Peet's departure, with his darker story giving way to a new emphasis on lightheartedness and jazzy tunes.

Songwriters The Sherman Brothers re-imagined King Louie as a more comedic character based around jazz and swing music. As Richard M. Sherman recalled: "...our discussion at the time [was], 'He's an ape, what does an ape do? Swings in a tree. The jazz is swing music and a guy literally swings if he's an ape'." Initially, Louis Armstrong was considered for the role. Richard Sherman said: "We thought it would be great for him, but one of the writers said 'You know the NAACP is going to jump all over it having a black man playing an ape – it would be politically terrible.' That was the last thing on our minds, nothing we'd ever thought of, so we said, 'Okay, we'll think of someone else.'"

Popular jazz and swing performer Louis Prima was cast as King Louie, based on the suggestion of Walt Disney Records president Jimmy Johnson that Prima 'would be great as a foil' for Phil Harris as Baloo. Prima received the audition in 1966, and the antics of him and his band during the audition performance inspired the animators. For example, the segment in which King Louie and the monkeys line up in a parade came from Prima and the band members acting similarly in their performance. Personality was also given to Louie by Milt Kahl, Frank Thomas, and John Lounsbery, three of Disney's Nine Old Men who animated the character. Kahl animated Louie's interaction with Mowgli, Thomas did his solo song and dance portions, while Lounsbery animated his scat duet with a disguised Baloo.

== The Jungle Book (1994) ==
A slightly different version of King Louie appears in Disney's 1994 live-action film, portrayed by trained Bornean orangutan Lowell. He is once again an orangutan "leader" of a group of monkeys and gibbons that make their home in an abandoned human city. This version gets his name from King Louis XIV, whose crown he wears. Kaa, a giant snake, appears to serve him. King Louie can summon him with a clap of his hands, even using him to ward off and kill intruders for his own amusement. He initially acts as a rival to Mowgli, but later warms up to him after seeing him defeat Kaa. Louie later watches the battle between Mowgli and Captain William Boone, applauding Mowgli for defeating Boone, before sending Kaa to kill Boone.

According to director Stephen Sommers, Lowell was the easiest and most comical animal to work with during filming. Lowell was the only animal actor to portray his character all throughout the film and his scenes were filmed on bluescreen stages in Los Angeles, due to the filming crew being unable to transport him to India.

== The Jungle Book (2016) ==
King Louie in promotional material for The Jungle Book (2016).

Christopher Walken voiced King Louie in Disney's 2016 live-action film. This version is portrayed as more sinister and antagonistic than his original incarnation and is a Gigantopithecus, an extinct species of great ape which once lived in India. In an interview, Walken described Louie as standing around 12 feet tall, and "as charming as he is, intimidating when he wants to be".

In the film, Louie offers Mowgli protection from Shere Khan in exchange for the secret of making fire, which he and his fellow Bandar-log plan to use to take over the jungle. While accommodating and friendly at first, he quickly becomes more spiteful and impatient, refusing to believe Mowgli's protests that he does not know how to make fire. He is briefly distracted by the appearance of Baloo, allowing Mowgli to be rescued by Bagheera.

However, they are spotted by one of Louie's pig-tailed macaque servants, and Louie orders the trio to be captured. Louie goes after Mowgli himself, trying to coerce him into staying by informing him of Akela's death. Mowgli refuses to believe this, and an infuriated Louie chases him through the temple, inadvertently destroying the pillars supporting his temple, and causing it to collapse over him. His Bandar-log start digging through the rubble to find him.

During the credits, Louie emerges from the rubble and performs "I Wan'na Be like You" with slightly modified lyrics.

== Other appearances ==
=== TaleSpin ===
In the Disney animated television series TaleSpin, King Louie (voiced by Jim Cummings) is a fun-loving orangutan who wears a Hawaiian shirt, a straw hat, and a lei. He owns an island nightclub restaurant and hotel called "Louie's Place", located near but outside the protection of the city of Cape Suzette. It also serves as a refueling station/pit stop area for pilots. Louie is Baloo's best friend (unlike in The Jungle Book, but like in the later Jungle Cubs), but can be competitive with him when it comes to women, treasure-hunting, along with business and monetary matters. His hold on the island is somewhat tenuous, even though through his own ingenuity and with the aid of his friends, he has managed to avoid losing it.

=== Jungle Cubs ===
In the Disney animated television series Jungle Cubs, Louie (voiced by Jason Marsden in season 1, and Cree Summer in season 2) is a juvenile orangutan and Baloo's best friend. He is very physically active, spending a great deal of his time in trees and eating bananas. Prince Louie (as he is referred to in the show) wants to become king of the jungle one day, and when any man-made objects turn up he immediately shows great interest. Jim Cummings voices the character as an adult in three animated segments featured on VHS releases of the series.

=== The Jungle Book 2 ===
King Louie is absent in the second film The Jungle Book 2 due to legal issues with Louis Prima's estate. However, a shadow puppet of him is seen at the beginning of the film, and Baloo implies that he left the jungle.

=== Fables comic series ===
King Louie appears in the Fables comic series published by Vertigo Comics. He appears in the "Animal Farm" story arc as one of the revolutionaries who wish to overthrow the Fabletown government out of resentment at the apparent second-class status of Fables. Due to his peripheral involvement, he is given a sentence of hard labor—twenty years, reduced to five years conditional on good behavior.

In Fables, Louie is wrongly described as having been created by Rudyard Kipling. Fables author Bill Willingham cited Louie's appearance in Fables as "a very good example of why it's best to go back to the source material before one embarks on a major story, rather than rely on the often faulty memory of which characters were original canon and which weren't".

=== Other appearances ===
- King Louie appears as a meetable character at Walt Disney Parks and Resorts.
- King Louie appears in the Morecambe and Wise sketch "The Wonderful World of Ernie", portrayed by Ernie Wise.
- King Louie appears as an unlockable playable character in Disney Magic Kingdoms.
- King Louie appears as a playable character in Disney Heroes: Battle Mode.

== Reception ==
The characterization of King Louie has frequently been cited as an example of racial stereotyping in Disney films, as some view him as a negative stereotype of African Americans. This was not the filmmaker's intention, as Louie's character and mannerisms were based on his voice actor, Louis Prima - a well-known Italian American jazz musician and performer who would have been instantly recognizable to audiences. Louis Armstrong was briefly considered for the part, but the filmmakers dropped the idea after realizing the negative implications.

In his 2004 book, The Gospel According to Disney, Mark Pinsky asserts that a child in the current environment (as opposed to in the late 1960s) would not discern any racial dimension to the portrayal. Pinsky also relates Orlando Sentinel's film critic Jay Bogar's assertion that "the primates could be perceived as representing African Americans in a time of turmoil, but [that Bogar] saw no racism in the portrayal".
