= Lord Tim Hudson =

British DJ (1940–2019)

- Born: George Timothy Brumwell; 11 February 1940; Prestbury, Cheshire, England
- Died: 14 December 2019 (aged 79); Chelsea, London, England
- Other name: George Timothy Hudson
- Occupations: DJ, artist, sports manager, voice actor

George Timothy Hudson (né Brumwell; 11 February 1940 – 14 December 2019), widely known as Lord Tim Hudson, was an English DJ. He worked in Los Angeles for KFWB during the mid-1960s and was the manager of The Seeds and The Lollipop Shoppe. He was also a voice actor, an artist and a sports manager, notably of the cricketer Ian Botham. His obituary in The Times characterised him as a "colourful chancer".

== Biography ==
Hudson was born George Timothy Brumwell on 11 February 1940 in Prestbury, Cheshire, and was educated in Cumberland and at Strathallan School, Perthshire. His father, Thomas Brumwell, served in Bomber Command in World War II and died in a raid over Belgium in 1944. In 1948, his widowed mother married Henry Hudson, who owned a cotton business.

Tim Hudson moved to London in 1961 before spending time in France, and in 1963 returned to London to work as a trainee executive for Prestige pressure cooker manufacturers. He resolved to work in the music industry and became a member of the fashionable "Chelsea Set". On a visit to Birmingham he offered to manage The Moody Blues, and then, according to his own account, introduced the band to Decca Records in London, though his role is disputed.

Hudson then moved to Montreal, Canada, where, as "Lord Tim of Liverpool", he became a DJ on station CKGM. When The Beatles embarked on their 1965 North American concert tour, radio station KCBQ in San Diego employed Hudson. He described himself as a record producer who claimed to know The Beatles personally, and to have helped discover the Moody Blues. Hudson made broadcasts publicising the band's appearances in the San Diego area. Using his contacts in England, Hudson managed to get permission to travel with the group before their concert in San Diego, and to file reports to be aired exclusively on KCBQ. However, it was said of him that:

He used his suave British accent to promote himself and became particularly popular among women. His problems surfaced, despite his claims to the contrary, when he could not do the simplest of tasks such as working the controls, playing records, or punching in ads. Having never before been on the radio, all he could do was sit in the studio and talk on the microphone. His brief stint at KCBQ, in terms of radio work, was one of the station’s worst staffing disasters.

Nonetheless, Hudson was able to land a high-profile evening slot on KFWB-Los Angeles that lasted for approximately a year and a half (1965–66). In March 1966, Hudson presented singer Nancy Sinatra with a gold disc to mark her million seller "These Boots Are Made for Walkin'". However, as the actual gold record had failed to arrive in time from New York, Hudson had to present Sinatra with the similarly earned disc of Dean Martin's "Everybody Loves Somebody"; at one point, Hudson was engaged to Martin's daughter. In 1967, he became the manager of The Seeds, promoting the band and writing liner notes for their record releases. At the time, he claimed to have invented the term "flower power". He later managed another band, The Lollipop Shoppe, but left the music industry, disillusioned, in 1969.

Hudson was also a voice actor during the 1960s and 1970s, and appeared in Disney's The Jungle Book (1967) as Dizzy the Vulture, and The Aristocats (1970) as 'Hip Cat' the English cat. In the early 1970s, he invested in property in Hollywood, remarried, and set up what he claimed was the first organic food restaurant in Hollywood. Later in the decade he had a radio show, Hudson's Theater of the Mind, on non-commercial station KXLU.

Returning to England, he bought Birtles Old Hall near Macclesfield in Cheshire, with an attached cricket ground, in 1984. A keen cricket fan, he invited the professional cricketer, and one-time England captain, Ian Botham to play in a match in at his ground. After Botham had been convicted on drugs charges, Hudson offered to become his manager, and promoted Botham in Hollywood as a potential film star, suggesting to film producer Menahem Golan that Botham could be the next James Bond. However, Botham became disillusioned with Hudson's plans, and eventually fired him. Hudson hosted celebrity cricket matches at the ground, known as the "Birtles Bowl", throughout the 1980s; he later sold both the house and the cricket ground.

In 1990, Hudson moved back to the U.S., and lived in Palm Springs, California. Some of his paintings have been exhibited, and he continued to work as a radio DJ. The latest edition of his autobiography From the Beatles to Botham was published in 2014.

He died after heart surgery on 14 December 2019. Hudson was married four times, with three divorces. He was married to Maxi Gordon Silver from the late 1970s until her death, and had a daughter from his second marriage.

== Filmography ==
=== Film ===
Year	Title	Role	Notes
1967	The Jungle Book	Flaps, The Vulture	Voice
1970	The Aristocats	Hit Cat – English Cat	Voice, (final film role)
