= I Wan'na Be Like You (The Monkey Song) =

1967 film song by the Sherman Brothers

Song by Louis Prima and Phil Harris

from the album The Jungle Book
- Released: 1967
- Label: Walt Disney
- Songwriters: Richard M. Sherman; Robert B. Sherman

"I Wan'na Be Like You (The Monkey Song)" is a song from Walt Disney's 1967 film The Jungle Book. The song was written by songwriters Robert and Richard Sherman, and was performed by singer and musician Louis Prima as King Louie, with Phil Harris providing additional vocals as Baloo the bear.

== Background ==
Walt Disney sought to make his version of The Jungle Book a lot more upbeat than the Rudyard Kipling-penned source material, the original Bill Peet script, and the initial score composed by Terry Gilkyson (whose song "The Bare Necessities" made it into the final film). The Sherman brothers were tasked with coming up with "crazy ways to have fun with [the music]."

Working with concept art of what the monkeys would look like, Richard Sherman said he and his brother aimed for a jazz sound, with a Dixieland-like melody. He added that "when we first got an idea for 'I Wan'na Be Like You', we said an ape swings from a tree, and he's the king of apes. We'll make him 'the king of the swingers'. That's the idea, we'll make him a jazz man." After suggesting that Louis Prima could play the part of King Louie, Walt Disney Records president Jimmy Johnson and music director Tutti Camarata asked the Sherman brothers to fly to Las Vegas and perform the song for Prima. Once Prima was invited to do the song, he mockingly responded to the Shermans with "You want to make a monkey out of me? You got me!"

The instrumentals were originally recorded by Prima – who also played the trumpet – and his band, Sam Butera & The Witnesses, but the music was replaced by one written by the film's composer, George Bruns, and orchestrated by Walter Sheets. The "scat dialogue" between Baloo and King Louie was the result of two recording sessions. Louis Prima recorded first, with the intent that Baloo – played in his recording by Butera – would simply repeat what Louie scatted, but Phil Harris decided not to imitate Prima's recording and made up his own. The song was released the same date as the motion picture itself.

== Personnel ==
- Louis Prima – vocals, trumpet, scat
- Phil Harris – vocals, scat
- Sam Butera – scat
- Bruce Reitherman – spoken word
- Walter Sheets – orchestration

== Cover versions ==
- Kenny Ball and His Jazzmen released a single of "I Wanna Be like You" (without an apostrophe in the title) in 1968 and it also featured on their 1969 album King of the Swingers.
- Pinky and Perky recorded a version for their Film Parade album in 1970 and also released the song as a single.
- On the 1990 collection Stay Awake: Various Interpretations of Music from Vintage Disney Films, the song appears (starting at 5'35" through to end) in "Opening Medley" as recorded by Los Lobos, who play the song occasionally in their live shows.
- On 5 April 1994 Phish performed a version at The Metropolis Concert Hall in Montreal, Quebec. Phish covered the song eight other times that year.
- Big Bad Voodoo Daddy did a cover of the song on the Swingers soundtrack, even though the song does not appear in the film. The band later released the song on their 1999 album This Beautiful Life.
- Voodoo Glow Skulls recorded a ska version of the song for the 2002 Japanese-exclusive album Dive into Disney.
- The Jungle Book 2, released in 2003, featured the band Smash Mouth playing the song during the end credits of the film; the song also appeared on the film's soundtrack. This cover is possibly to make up for King Louis being one of the characters from the original movie to not appear. In the Australian version, Nikki Webster covers the song, which is also featured on her Best of album.
- In 2007, a pop rock cover was recorded by the Jonas Brothers for Disneymania 5. That same year, for the 40th anniversary of the film, Dutch musical group XYP covered it as well in a swing-pop style.
- Scottish singer Paolo Nutini performed "I Wan'na Be like You" at the 2007 Glastonbury Festival.
- On 23 October 2010, X Factor contestant Katie Waissel pleased the judges with her surprise selection of the song.
- In 2011, Serbian-Montenegrin duo Flamingosi covered the song with new lyrics in Serbian as "Nebojša" on their album Seti se našeg zaveta. Their cover samples the 2007 cover by XYP.
- Craig David sang a cover of the song for an award ceremony in the UK; the video is on YouTube.
- In November 2013, the Overtones recorded a cover of the song as a mix with "The Bare Necessities" for their album Saturday Night at the Movies.
- In 2015, Fall Out Boy recorded a cover version of the song for the compilation album We Love Disney.
- Christopher Walken performs the song as King Louie in the 2016 live-action adaptation, with new lyrics written by Richard M. Sherman to reflect the character of Louie being depicted as a Gigantopithecus.
- In 2016 the Bridge City Sinners recorded a folk punk cover of the song on their album Bridge City Sinners.
- J-pop band Little Glee Monster recorded a Japanese cover of the song titled 'Kimi no yō ni naritai' (君のようになりたい).
- The Fun Songs version is performed in a 1994 Disney Sing-Along Songs home video: Let's Go to the Circus. In it, Toby Scott Ganger imagines what it would be like if he and his friends were all monkeys in the Ringling Bros. and Barnum & Bailey Circus show.
- Australian band Psychedelic Porn Crumpets covered the song for Triple J's "Like A Version" in 2020.

== Robbie Williams version ==
"I Wanna Be like You"

Song by Robbie Williams featuring Olly Murs

from the album Swings Both Ways
- Length: 3:31
- Label: Island; Universal; Walt Disney
- Songwriters: Richard Sherman; Robert Sherman
- Producer: Guy Chambers

"I Wan'na Be like You" was covered by British recording artist Robbie Williams featuring British recording artist Olly Murs for his tenth studio album, Swings Both Ways (2013). Production of their rendition was handled by Guy Chambers. However, in the liner notes Robbie Williams incorrectly attributes the original to Phil Harris, and says how much he admires Harris (p. 4 of notes in Deluxe Edition).

=== Weekly charts ===
| Chart (2013) | Peak position |
|---|---|
| Austria (Ö3 Austria Top 40) | 55 |
| Germany (GfK) | 85 |
| Ireland (IRMA) | 64 |

== Uses in popular culture ==
- In 1978, a live-action sketch titled The Wonderful World of Ernie from Morecambe and Wise parodied the song by doing a full reenactment of the scene with sets and costumes and lip-synching to the original recording (including the characters' spoken dialogue in the middle of the song). The sketch starred Danny Rolnick as Mowgli, Derek Griffiths as Bagheera, Eric Morecambe as Baloo and Ernie Wise as King Louie.
- In 2008, the NHS featured the song in an anti-smoking public information film. The ad depicts children mimicking their parents' behaviors (e.g. cooking, reading the newspaper, and washing the car), all while the song plays. However, the music slows to a halt when a girl is shown imitating her mother's smoking by putting a crayon to her lips. The advertisement concludes with the message: "Smoking. Don't keep it in the family."
- The Robbie Williams/Olly Murs collaborative cover appears in season 3, episode 9 of the TV drama Stella.
- In 2015, "I Wanna Be like You" was featured in season 1, episode 7 of the TV drama Aquarius.
- The song was used in a popular TikTok trend during the year 2019.
- In 2022, it was used on The Voice of Germany by Sid Bader, where he received an all turn.
