= The Jungle Book: Mowgli's Story =

1998 film by Nick Marck

- VHS cover
- Directed by: Nick Marck
- Screenplay by: José Rivera; Jim Herzfeld
- Based on: The Jungle Book by Rudyard Kipling
- Produced by: Mark H. Ovitz
- Starring: Brandon Baker; Sherman Howard; Clancy Brown; Peri Gilpin; Wallace Shawn; Stephen Tobolowsky; Eartha Kitt; Kathy Najimy; Brian Doyle-Murray; Marty Ingels
- Narrated by: Fred Savage
- Cinematography: Ronn Schmidt
- Edited by: Alan Baumgarten
- Music by: Robert Folk
- Production company: Walt Disney Pictures
- Distributed by: Buena Vista Home Entertainment (Note: Distributed under the Walt Disney Home Video imprint.)
- Release date: September 29, 1998
- Running time: 77 minutes
- Country: United States
- Language: English

The Jungle Book: Mowgli's Story is a 1998 American adventure film directed by Nick Marck, produced by Mark H. Orvitz, and written by José Rivera and Jim Herzfeld. It is the third film adaptation by The Walt Disney Company of the Mowgli stories from The Jungle Book (1894) by Rudyard Kipling. It stars Brandon Baker, and features the voice work of Brian Doyle-Murray, Eartha Kitt, Clancy Brown, Peri Gilpin, and Sherman Howard.

The film chronicles the life of a boy named Mowgli (Baker) from the time he lived with humans as an infant to the time when he was raised by wild animals and rediscovered humans again as a teenager. It was distributed by Buena Vista Home Entertainment under the Walt Disney Home Video imprint on September 29, 1998.

== Plot ==
Shere Khan the tiger and his sidekick Tabaqui the hyena attack a group of villagers. A young boy named Mowgli runs off in search of his parents, only to get lost. He is taken into a grey wolf pack and raised by wolves Akela and Raksha.

Mowgli befriends Baloo the bear, Bagheera the panther, Chil the vulture, and Hathi the elephant. Mowgli learns that man poses a danger to the jungle and the animals after seeing part of the jungle destroyed by fire. Bagheera and Baloo swear to protect Mowgli from Shere Khan. Bagheera and Baloo attempt to teach Mowgli how to hunt and how to defend himself against Shere Khan.

A few of the wolves team up with Shere Khan, believing that a human does not belong in a wolf pack. During the pack's next hunt, these wolves cause Mowgli to ruin the hunt, making the pack go hungry. Upset, Mowgli decides to run away from the pack. He is trapped by some monkeys, who are also secretly working for Shere Khan. When Raksha races to rescue Mowgli, Shere Khan attacks Raksha and kills her. Bagheera and Baloo rescue Mowgli and take him away from Monkey Town. Blaming himself for Raksha's death, Mowgli tries to run away from the jungle. Little Raksha, Mowgli's adopted sister, runs off to try and stop him.

Mowgli comes upon a human village and sees his own kind. Mowgli then hears Little Raksha's cries for help and returns to the jungle to free her from a bear trap. Little Raksha reminds Mowgli that he took the "Hunter's Oath" and shouldn't run away. Mowgli realizes that it is time to face Shere Khan not as a wolf, but as a man.

That night, Mowgli traps Shere Khan and banishes him from the jungle. Mowgli is praised by everyone, including the wolf bullies, who admit that they were wrong about him. The role of leader of the pack is offered to Mowgli, but gives it to Little Raksha. The next day, Bagheera and Baloo give Mowgli a book featuring jungle animals. He thanks them and then runs off.

== Cast ==
- Brandon Baker as Mowgli the man cub
  - Ryan Taylor as Young Mowgli
- Rajan Patel as Indian Soldier

=== Voice cast ===
- Sherman Howard as Shere Khan the tiger
- Clancy Brown as Akela the wolf
- Peri Gilpin as Raksha the wolf
- Wallace Shawn as Tarzan Chimp
- Stephen Tobolowsky as Tabaqui the hyena
- Eartha Kitt as Bagheera the panther
- Kathy Najimy as Chil the vulture
- Brian Doyle-Murray as Baloo the bear
- Marty Ingels as Hathi the elephant
- Fred Savage as Adult Mowgli (Narrator)
- Dee Bradley Baker as Elephant, Bee, Mandrill, Turtle
- Nancy Cartwright as Wolf Pup, Doe, Macaw, Skunk, Chimp
- Ashley Peldon as Teenage Li'l Raksha
- Richard Kind as Chimp 1
- Catherine Lloyd Burns as Chimp 2
- Ken Campbell as Wolf 1
- Scott Menville as Wolf 2
- Quinton Flynn as Wolf 3, Bad Baboon
- Kay Kuter as Biranyi
- Katie Volding as Baby Li'l Raksha
- Isaac Lichter-Marck as Wolf Pup
- Myles Jeffrey as Wolf Pup
- Dee Dee Rescher as Turtle, Rhesus
- Harriet Harris as Turtle, Rhesus
- Patrick Egan as Water Buffalo, Wolf, Rhesus
- Frank Welker as Porcupine, Bad Baboon, Deer, Mandrill, Special Vocal Effects, Additional Voices

== Reception ==
Tracy Moore from Common Sense Media stated that "this live-action sequel to The Jungle Book is a little clunky -- the jungle feels more backwoods than rainforest, and animals talk, but their mouths don't move."
