= The Bare Necessities =

Song from the animated 1967 Disney film The Jungle Book

Song by Phil Harris and Bruce Reitherman

from the album The Jungle Book
- B-side: "Trust in Me" (Sterling Holloway)
- Released: 1967
- Recorded: 1966
- Genre: Jazz
- Length: 4:51
- Label: Disneyland
- Songwriter: Terry Gilkyson

"The Bare Necessities" is a jazz song, written by Terry Gilkyson, from Disney's 1967 animated feature film The Jungle Book, sung by Phil Harris as Baloo and Bruce Reitherman as Mowgli. Bill Murray and Neel Sethi in the same respective roles performed the song in the 2016 remake.

== Background ==
Originally, it was written for an earlier draft of the film that was never produced. The Sherman Brothers, who wrote the other songs of the film, kept this as the only song used from the previous version. A reprise of the song was sung by Sebastian Cabot as Bagheera and Phil Harris as Baloo at the end of the film. Van Dyke Parks worked on the arrangement. In 1967, "The Bare Necessities" was nominated for an Academy Award for Best Original Song but lost to "Talk to the Animals" from Doctor Dolittle. A hip-hop version of the song performed by Lou Rawls was used as the theme song for Jungle Cubs.

== Other versions ==
- Louis Armstrong covered the song on his 1968 album Disney Songs the Satchmo Way.
- Steve Tyrell covered the song on his February 28, 2006 album The Disney Standards.
- Brian Wilson covered it on his album In the Key of Disney, released on October 25, 2011.
- The Overtones covered the song on their album Saturday Night at the Movies, released on November 1, 2013.
- The Country Bears perform the song in the finale of the Country Bear Musical Jamboree at Magic Kingdom park, debuting in 2024. The song was originally considered for the 1971 original Jamboree.

== Certifications ==
Region	Certification	Certified units/sales
United Kingdom (BPI)	Gold	400,000^{‡}
United States (RIAA)	Gold	500,000^{‡}
^{‡} Sales+streaming figures based on certification alone.
