= The Jungle Book (1967 film) =

1967 animated Disney film

- Theatrical release poster
- Directed by: Wolfgang Reitherman
- Story by: Larry Clemmons; Ralph Wright; Ken Anderson; Vance Gerry
- Based on: The Jungle Book by Rudyard Kipling
- Produced by: Walt Disney
- Starring: Phil Harris; Sebastian Cabot; Louis Prima; George Sanders; Sterling Holloway
- Narrated by: Sebastian Cabot
- Edited by: Tom Acosta; Norman Carlisle
- Music by: George Bruns
- Production company: Walt Disney Productions
- Distributed by: Buena Vista Distribution
- Release date: October 18, 1967
- Running time: 78 minutes
- Country: United States
- Language: English
- Budget: $4 million
- Box office: $378 million

The Jungle Book is a 1967 American animated musical adventure film produced by Walt Disney Productions and released by Buena Vista Distribution. Based on the "Mowgli" stories from Rudyard Kipling's 1894 book of the same name, it is the final animated feature film to be produced by Walt Disney, who died during its production. It was directed by Wolfgang Reitherman and written by Larry Clemmons, Ralph Wright, Ken Anderson, and Vance Gerry. Featuring the voices of Phil Harris, Sebastian Cabot, Louis Prima, George Sanders, and Sterling Holloway, the film's plot follows Mowgli, a feral child raised in the Indian jungle by wolves, as his friends, Bagheera the panther and Baloo the bear, try to convince him to leave the jungle before the ruthless tiger Shere Khan arrives.

The early versions of both the screenplay and the soundtrack followed Kipling's work more closely, with a dramatic, dark, and sinister tone, which Disney did not want in his family film, leading to writer Bill Peet and songwriter Terry Gilkyson being replaced.

The Jungle Book was released on October 18, 1967, to positive reviews, with acclaim for its soundtrack, featuring five songs by the Sherman Brothers and one by Gilkyson, "The Bare Necessities". With a gross of $23.8 million worldwide, the film initially became Disney's second-highest-grossing animated film in the United States and Canada, the ninth-highest-grossing film of 1967, and was also successful during its re-releases. The film was also successful throughout the world, becoming Germany's highest-grossing film by number of admissions. It also held the record as the highest-selling animated film based on ticket sales until that record was overtaken by Ne Zha 2 in 2025. Disney released a live-action adaptation in 1994 and an animated sequel in 2003; a second live-action remake directed by Jon Favreau was released in 2016, with a sequel to that film in development.

== Plot ==
In the jungles of India, a wise black panther named Bagheera discovers an orphaned baby boy and brings him to a pack of wolves, who name him Mowgli. Ten years later, the pack learns that the murderous Bengal tiger Shere Khan has returned to their area of the jungle. Knowing that he hates humans and will stop at nothing to kill Mowgli, the pack decides that the latter must leave; Bagheera agrees to escort Mowgli to a nearby "Man-Village", though Mowgli is reluctant to leave the only home he has ever known, as he does not fear Shere Khan, and believes he can last against him.

Bagheera and Mowgli rest in a tree where an Indian python named Kaa attempts to devour Mowgli by hypnotizing him, but is stopped by Bagheera. The next morning, Mowgli encounters Colonel Hathi and his elephant herd. Following an argument where Mowgli refuses to go to the Man-Village, he is abandoned by Bagheera. All alone, Mowgli meets and befriends Baloo, a laid-back and carefree sloth bear who promises Mowgli can stay in the jungle with him. Mowgli is soon kidnapped by a gang of monkeys and Hoolock gibbons, who bring him to their leader, King Louie, an orangutan. King Louie tries to persuade Mowgli to teach him the ways of man, until Baloo and Bagheera arrive and rescue him, destroying King Louie's temple in the process.

Whilst Mowgli is sleeping that night, Bagheera tries to convince Baloo that Mowgli must be taken to the Man-Village. Baloo remains unconvinced until Bagheera reminds him that Shere Khan will try and kill Mowgli, as he is afraid of man's guns and fire. This persuades Baloo, who tells Mowgli the next morning that he must take him to the Man-Village; feeling betrayed, Mowgli accuses him of breaking his promise and runs away. Bagheera later finds Colonel Hathi's herd and seeks their help in finding Mowgli. However, unbeknownst to any of them, Shere Khan has overheard this and now decides to hunt and kill Mowgli himself.

Whilst going through the jungle, Mowgli is ambushed by Kaa once more, who hypnotizes him again. However, before he can devour him, Shere Khan arrives and tells Kaa that he is looking for a "man-cub"; Kaa manages to hide Mowgli. After escaping Kaa, Mowgli reaches the wastelands of the jungle where he meets and befriends a group of vultures. However, Shere Khan soon arrives and tries to kill Mowgli. He tries to fight, but soon begins to lose his nerve after realizing how terrifying the tiger truly is, before Baloo intervenes. Whilst Shere Khan attacks and nearly kills Baloo, Mowgli ties a burning branch to Shere Khan's tail, forcing him to run away in defeat. Mowgli now mourns the loss of Baloo; as Bagheera respectfully takes Mowgli away, Baloo reveals he is alive, much to everyone's happiness.

As they get closer to the Man-Village, Mowgli meets a girl getting water from the river and instantly falls in love. He follows her into the Man-Village, having finally accepted the fact that he is a human. Content that Mowgli is where he belongs, Baloo and Bagheera return to the jungle.

== Voice cast ==
A promotional image of the characters from the film. Top row: Kaa, Ziggy, Buzzie, Flaps, Dizzy, Colonel Hathi; Middle row: Flunkey, King Louie, Shere-Khan, Mowgli, Bagheera, the Girl, Baloo, Hathi Jr.; Bottom row: wolf cubs, Mother Wolf, and Rama.

- Bruce Reitherman as Mowgli, also referred to as Man-Cub, a naive and stubborn young human boy who was raised by the Seeonee wolf pack and wants to stay in the jungle despite the threat of Shere Khan.
- Sebastian Cabot as Bagheera, a wise and intelligent black panther who discovers Mowgli as a baby and later becomes his main protector. He also serves as the film's narrator.
- Phil Harris as Baloo, a lazy and carefree sloth bear who believes in the importance of letting go of worries and focusing on the simple things in life.
- George Sanders as Shere Khan, a confident and menacing Bengal tiger who is deeply feared by most of the animals of the jungle.
  - Bill Lee was Shere Khan's singing voice, and Jimmy MacDonald provided his roars.
- Sterling Holloway as Kaa, a sly and sinister Indian python who seeks Mowgli as prey, but fails each time he attempts to eat him.
- J. Pat O'Malley as Colonel Hathi, a pompous Indian elephant who leads the elephant patrol.
  - O'Malley also voiced Buzzie, the leader of the vulture quartet that Mowgli encounters during his journey.
- Verna Felton as Winifred, Colonel Hathi's snarky and outspoken wife and the second-in-command of the elephant patrol.
- Clint Howard as Hathi Jr., also known as Baby Elephant, the son of Colonel Hathi and Winifred.
- Louis Prima as King Louie, the cool and smooth-talking orangutan leader of the monkeys from the ruins of an ancient palace who wants to learn how to make fire.
- Lord Tim Hudson as Dizzy, one of the members of the vulture quartet.
- Chad Stuart as Flaps, one of the members of the vulture quartet.
- Digby Wolfe as Ziggy, one of the members of the vulture quartet.
- John Abbott as Akela, the leader of the Seeonee wolf pack who sends Mowgli to the Man-Village under Bagheera's guidance.
- Ben Wright as Rama, Mowgli's adoptive wolf father.
- Darleen Carr as the Girl, who charms Mowgli into following her to the Man-Village at the end of the film.
- Leo De Lyon, Bill Skiles, Pete Henderson, and Hal Smith as King Louie's monkeys.

== Production ==
=== Early development ===
Walt Disney first considered making an animated version of Rudyard Kipling's 1894 collection of stories The Jungle Book in the late 1930s. In the early 1960s, after completing his work on The Sword in the Stone, story artist Bill Peet proposed The Jungle Book as the studio's next animated feature, seeing it as a "great chance to develop some good animal characters". Disney agreed and acquired the film rights to all thirteen Jungle Book stories from the estate of Alexander Korda (who had produced the 1942 film adaptation) by April 1962, after having spent the previous ten years in negotiations. At that point, Peet had written an early story treatment and developed the initial character designs. Disney originally intended to closely follow Kipling's work, planning to make a film that would be "both naturalistic and fantastic, suggestive of the compelling stag fight in Bambi".

Peet created his treatment with little supervision, as he had done with One Hundred and One Dalmatians and The Sword in the Stone. He tried to make the story more linear, since the novel was very episodic, while preserving its ominous tone and adding more drama and suspense (in particular, Peet's story would start with wolves and Bagheera rescuing baby Mowgli from falling from a waterfall). He also decided on Mowgli's journey from the jungle back to the Man-Village as the film's central storyline. One of the few major departures from Kipling's works was the character of Baloo, whom Peet rewrote into a "big playful buffoon of a bear", with the role of Mowgli's serious-minded mentor given to Bagheera. Peet created an original character for the film – King Louie, the leader of the Bandar-log, who would kidnap Mowgli and try to get him to teach them how to make fire and rebuild the ancient city. Louie was also to show Mowgli the treasure under the ruins (a plot point borrowed from The Second Jungle Book), which would serve as a setup for the film's climax. After Mowgli had arrived to the Man-Village, he would get into an argument with the local hunter Buldeo, which would cause Mowgli to return to the jungle with a torch and use it to scare those who attacked or mocked him through the journey and confront Shere Khan, before being dragged to the ancient city by Buldeo in search for the treasure. After taking some of the treasures, Buldeo would attempt to burn the jungle to avoid the threat of Shere Khan, only for the tiger to attack and kill him, before being killed by Mowgli with Buldeo's rifle. Because of his actions, Mowgli would be hailed as a hero in both the jungle and the village and declared the first human member of the wolves' council.

After the critical reception of The Sword in the Stone, Walt Disney decided to get more involved in the story development of The Jungle Book than he had been with the past two films. Upon reviewing the storyboards, Disney felt that Peet's approach was too dark and depressing, and held a meeting, insisting on making the story lighter and more aimed at the family demographic. Peet, who had been working on his treatment for over a year by then, refused, resulting in a long argument between him and Disney. On January 29, 1964, Peet left the studio after another fight with Disney over the preliminary recording for Bagheera's voice as well as Disney insulting him claiming that he should see Mary Poppins for "real entertainment". Peet would later admit in his autobiography that he was glad he did not insult Disney back over the film and left the studio when he did knowing Disney would die two years after he left.

=== Rewriting ===
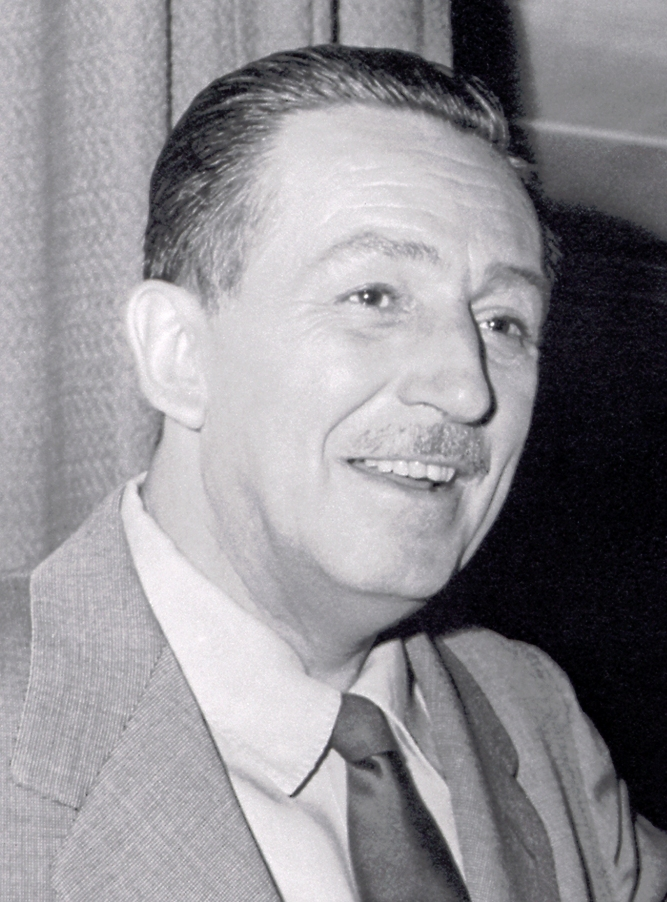
The Jungle Book was the last animated feature Walt Disney supervised before his death in December 1966.

After Peet's departure, Disney assigned Larry Clemmons as his new writer and one of the four-story men for the film, giving Clemmons a copy of Kipling's book, and telling him: "The first thing I want you to do is not to read it". Clemmons still looked at the novel and thought it was too disjointed and without continuity, needing adaptations to fit a film script. Clemmons wanted to start in medias res, with some flashbacks afterward, but then Disney said to focus on doing the storyline more straight: "Let's do the meat of the picture. Let's establish the characters. Let's have fun with it".

Although most of Peet's work was discarded, the personalities of the characters remained in the final film. This was because Disney felt that the story should be kept simple, and the characters should drive the story. Disney took an active role in the story meetings, acting out each role and helping to explore the emotions of the characters, helping create gags, and developing emotional sequences. The Sherman Brothers re-imagined Peet's darker and more sinister version of King Louie as a more comedic character based around jazz and swing music. As Richard M. Sherman recalled: "...our discussion at the time [was], 'He's an ape, what does an ape do? Swings in a tree. The jazz is swing music and a guy literally swings if he's an ape'". Clemmons also created the human girl with whom Mowgli falls in love, as the animators considered that falling in love would be the best excuse for Mowgli to leave the jungle. Clemmons would write a rough script with an outline for most sequences. The story artists then discussed how to fill the scenes, including the comedic gags to employ. The script also tried to incorporate how the voice actors molded their characters and interacted with each other. The Jungle Book also marked the last animated film to have Disney's personal touches, before his death on December 15, 1966.

=== Casting ===
Walt Disney wanted to bring in more well-known performers to voice the key characters of The Jungle Book (which was a rarity in his past works). All the celebrities cast in the film had inspired the animators in creating the characters and helped to shape their personalities. The studio held many auditions for the role of Baloo, initially searching for an Ed Wynn-esque voice. The animators also tried out exchange students from India to see if they could get a voice with an indigenous quality, but the idea did not work out. Disney eventually suggested Phil Harris after meeting him at a benefit in Palm Springs, much to the surprise of the animation staff, who could not imagine Harris (who was a bandleader and comedian) as Kipling's character. Harris nearly turned down the role after doing a test recording, as he could not see himself as the character, but reconsidered after the filmmakers allowed him to perform the way that felt the most comfortable to him. Wolfgang Reitherman said when they "told [Harris] not to be a bear, but to be Phil Harris, he got in front of the microphone and tore that thing apart". The casting of Harris prompted the story artists to expand the role of Baloo from an episodic part to one of the film's main characters. Many of Baloo's lines were improvised by Harris.

Disney initially considered Louis Armstrong for the role of King Louie; according to Richard M. Sherman, the idea was discarded after one of the writers said that "'NAACP is going to jump all over it having a black man playing an ape – it would be politically terrible'. That was the last thing on our minds, nothing we'd ever thought of, so we said 'okay, we'll think of someone else'". After Phil Harris was cast as Baloo, Disneyland Records president Jimmy Johnson suggested Disney to get Louis Prima, whom he thought to be great as a foil for Harris' character.

Disney had vultures bearing a physical and vocal resemblance to The Beatles, including the signature mop-top haircut. It was planned to have the members of the band to both voice the characters and sing their song, "That's What Friends Are For". However, at the time, The Beatles' John Lennon refused to work on animated films, which led to the idea being discarded. The casting of the vultures still brought a British Invasion musician, Chad Stuart of the duo Chad & Jeremy. In earlier drafts of the scene the vultures had a near-sighted rhinoceros friend named Rocky, who was to be voiced by Frank Fontaine, but Disney decided to cut the character, feeling that the film already had enough action with the monkeys and vultures.

Child actor David Bailey was originally cast as Mowgli, but during the film's production he hit puberty, and his voice changed. As a result, Wolfgang Reitherman replaced him with his son Bruce, who had just voiced Christopher Robin in Winnie the Pooh and the Honey Tree. The animators also shot a live-action footage of Bruce Reitherman as a guide for the character's animation performance. Child actress Darlene Carr was going around singing in the studio when composers Sherman Brothers asked her to record a demo of "My Own Home". Carr's performance impressed Disney enough for him to cast her as the role of the human girl. Clint Howard was cast as Hathi Jr.

Early in the film's development, Bill Peet suggested Howard Morris for the role of Bagheera, but Disney did not approve of the choice, with Wolfgang Reitherman and other animators preferring either Rod Taylor, Karl Swenson or Sebastian Cabot. Cabot was the final choice. Several of the studio's voice regulars were cast in the film, including Sterling Holloway as Kaa, J. Pat O'Malley as both Colonel Hathi and Buzzie the Vulture, and Verna Felton as Winifred. This was to be Felton's final film performance; she died ten months before the film's release, on December 14, 1966, the day before Walt Disney passed away.

=== Animation ===
Animation on The Jungle Book commenced on June 1, 1965. While many of the later Disney feature films had animators being responsible for single characters, in The Jungle Book the animators were in charge of whole sequences, since many have characters interacting with one another. The animation was done by xerography, with character design, led by Ken Anderson, employing rough, artistic edges in contrast to the round animals seen in productions such as Dumbo.

Anderson also decided to make Shere Khan resemble his voice actor, George Sanders. Backgrounds were hand-painted—with an exception of the waterfall, mostly consisting of footage of the Angel Falls—and sometimes scenery was used in both foreground and bottom to create a notion of depth. One of Reitherman's trademarks was repurposing animation from previous animated films, including his. For example, animation of the wolf cubs were redrawn from the dalmatian puppies in One Hundred and One Dalmatians. Animator Milt Kahl based Bagheera and Shere Khan's movements on live-action felines, which he saw in two Disney productions, A Tiger Walks and the True-Life Adventure film Jungle Cat.

Baloo was also based on footage of bears, even incorporating the animal's penchant for scratching. Since Kaa has no limbs, his design received big expressive eyes, and parts of Kaa's body did the action that normally would be done with hands. The monkeys' dance during "I Wan'na Be Like You" was partially inspired by a performance Louis Prima did with his band on a Las Vegas soundstage that convinced Disney to cast him.

=== Music ===
The film's score was composed by George Bruns and orchestrated by Walter Sheets. Two of the cues were reused from previous Disney films: the scene where Mowgli wakes up after escaping King Louie used one of Bruns' themes for Sleeping Beauty (1959), and the scene where Bagheera gives a eulogy to Baloo when he mistakenly thinks the bear was killed by Shere Khan used Paul J. Smith's organ score from Snow White and the Seven Dwarfs (1937).

The score features six original songs: five by the Sherman Brothers and one by Terry Gilkyson. Longtime Disney collaborator Gilkyson was the first songwriter to bring several complete songs that followed the book closely, but Walt Disney felt that his efforts were too dark. The only piece of Gilkyson's work which survived to the final film was his upbeat tune "The Bare Necessities", which was liked by the rest of the film crew. The Sherman Brothers were then brought in to do a complete rewrite. Disney asked the siblings if they had read Kipling's book and they replied that they had done so "a long, long time ago" and that they had also seen the 1942 version by Alexander Korda. Disney said the "nice, mysterious, heavy stuff" from both works was not what he aimed for, instead going for a "lightness, a Disney touch". Disney frequently brought the composers to the storyline sessions. He asked them to "find scary places and write fun songs" for their compositions that fit in with the story and advanced the plot instead of being interruptive.

== Release ==
=== Original theatrical run ===
The Jungle Book premiered at the Grauman's Chinese Theatre in Hollywood on October 18, 1967, ten months after Walt Disney's death. The premiere served as a fundraiser for the Los Angeles Zoo, which had been founded the year before. By December 1967, The Jungle Book was released in theaters; some bookings were in a double feature format with a live-action film Charlie, the Lonesome Cougar (1967).

Produced on a budget of $4 million, The Jungle Book was a box-office success, grossing domestic rentals of $11.5 million by 1968. By 1970, the film had grossed $13 million in domestic rentals, becoming the second highest-grossing animated film in the United States and Canada. The Jungle Book also earned over $23.8 million worldwide, becoming the most successful animated film released during its initial run.

=== Re-releases ===
The Jungle Book was re-released theatrically in 1978, 1984, and 1990, and also in Europe throughout the 1970s and 1980s. As part of Disney's 100th anniversary the film was re-released in cinemas across the UK on September 15, 2023 for one week. A re-issue in the United Kingdom in 1976 generated rentals of $1.8 million. The 1978 re-release increased its North American rentals to $27.3 million, which surpassed Snow White and the Seven Dwarfs making it the highest grossing animated film in the United States and Canada until Snow White was re-released in 1983. The film's total lifetime gross in the U.S. and Canada is $141 million.^{1} When adjusted for inflation, it is estimated to be equivalent to $671,224,000 in 2018, which would make it the 32nd highest-grossing film in the United States and Canada.

By 1981, The Jungle Book was Disney's best performer overseas, with rentals of $45 million, including $13 million from a 1980 reissue in Spain. It is Germany's biggest film in terms of admissions with 27.3 million tickets sold, nearly 10 million more than Titanic's 18.8 million tickets sold. It has grossed an estimated $108 million in Germany, making it the third highest-grossing film in that country behind only Avatar ($137 million) and Titanic ($125 million). The film was the seventh most popular sound film of the twentieth century in the UK with admissions of 19.8 million. The film is France's ninth biggest film in terms of admissions with 14.8 million tickets sold. The film's 1993 re-release set an overseas record for a re-issue, grossing $67.5 million overseas during that year. It opened at number one in Germany with a gross of more than $4 million in its first six days and opened in second place at the UK box office before moving to number one for two weeks.

On September 15, 2023, The Jungle Book was re-released in cinemas across the UK for one week as part of Disney's 100th anniversary.

=== Home media ===
The Jungle Book was released in the United States on VHS on May 3, 1991 as part of the Walt Disney Classics video line and in the United Kingdom in October 1993. In the United States, the VHS release sold 7.4 million units and grossed $184,926,000 in 1991, making it the year's third best-selling home video release, behind only Fantasia and Home Alone. By 1994, The Jungle Book sold 9.5 million units in the United States. Home video sales outside North America reached a record 14 million units and grossed $350 million by December 1993. Overseas sales reached 14.8 million units by January 1994, becoming the bestselling international VHS release in overseas markets, including sales of 4.9 million units in the United Kingdom, 4.3 million in Germany, and 1.2 million in France. By August 1994, it had sold 15 million units in international overseas markets, bringing worldwide sales to 24.5 million units by 1994. As of 2002, The Jungle Book held the record for the bestselling home video release in the United Kingdom, ahead of Titanic, which sold 4.8 million units.

It was reissued on video on October 14, 1997 as part of the Walt Disney Masterpiece Collection for the film's 30th anniversary. That one was THX certified and featured an exclusive documentary. A Limited Issue DVD was released by Buena Vista Home Entertainment in 1999. The film was released once again as a 2-disc Platinum Edition DVD on October 2, 2007, to commemorate its 40th anniversary. Its release was accompanied by a limited 18-day run at Disney's own El Capitan Theatre in Los Angeles, with the opening night featuring a panel with composer Richard Sherman and voice actors Bruce Reitherman, Darlene Carr, and Chad Stuart. The Platinum DVD was put on moratorium in 2010. The film was released in a Blu-ray, DVD, and Digital Copy Combo pack on February 11, 2014, as part of Disney's Diamond Edition line. The Diamond Edition release went back into the Disney Vault on January 31, 2017. In the United States, the DVD and Blu-ray releases sold 12 million units between 2007 and 2016, and have grossed $304 million as of August 2018. A Limited Edition from Disney Movie Club was released on Blu-ray and DVD combo on March 26, 2019. The film was re-released on Blu-ray, DVD, and Digital Copy on February 22, 2022, in honor of the film's 55th anniversary.

== Reception ==
=== Critical response ===
The Jungle Book received positive reviews upon release, undoubtedly influenced by a nostalgic reaction to the death of Walt Disney. Time magazine noted the film strayed far from the Kipling stories, but "[n]evertheless, the result is thoroughly delightful...it is the happiest possible way to remember Walt Disney". Howard Thompson of The New York Times praised the film as "simple, uncluttered, straight-forward fun, as put together by the director, Wolfgang Reitherman, four screen writers and the usual small army of technicians. Using some lovely exotic pastel backgrounds and a nice clutch of tunes, the picture unfolds like an intelligent comic-strip fairy tale". Richard Schickel, reviewing for Life magazine, referred to it as "the best thing of its kind since Dumbo, another short, bright, unscary and blessedly uncultivated cartoon". Charles Champlin of the Los Angeles Times wrote the film was "really, really good Disney indeed, and nobody needs to say a great deal more". Arthur D. Murphy of Variety gave the film a favorable review while noting that "the story development is restrained" and that younger audiences "may squirm at times". The song "The Bare Necessities" was nominated for Best Original Song at the 40th Academy Awards, losing to "Talk to the Animals" from Doctor Dolittle. Academy of Motion Picture Arts and Sciences president Gregory Peck lobbied extensively for the film to be nominated for Best Picture, but was unsuccessful.

Retrospective reviews were also positive, with the film's animation, characters and music receiving much praise throughout the years. On the review aggregator website Rotten Tomatoes, the film received an approval rating of 86% based on 43 reviews, with an average rating of 7.3/10. The site's critical consensus reads: "With expressive animation, fun characters, and catchy songs, The Jungle Book endures as a crowd-pleasing Disney classic". In 1990, when the film had its last theatrical re-release, Ken Tucker of Entertainment Weekly considered that The Jungle Book "isn't a classic Walt Disney film on the order of, say, Cinderella or Pinocchio, but it's one of Disney's liveliest and funniest". Charles Solomon, reviewing for the Los Angeles Times, thought the film's animators were "near the height of their talents" and the resulting film "remains a high-spirited romp that will delight children—and parents weary of action films with body counts that exceed their box-office grosses". In 2010, Empire described the film as one that "gets pretty much everything right", noting that the vibrant animation and catchy songs overcame the plot deficiencies.

Colin Greenland reviewed The Jungle Book for Imagine magazine, and stated that "the last film the old boy worked on himself and I reckon the last good animated feature in his traditional mode – not least because of some rather jolly jazz which, legend has it, Walt himself resisted, and was added after his death".

=== Criticism of racist presentations ===
There has been criticism of the portrayal of King Louie, whom some have viewed as a racist caricature of African Americans. However, this was not the filmmakers' intention as the character and mannerisms of King Louie were largely based on his voice actor, Louis Prima, a well-known Italian American jazz musician and performer, who would have been instantly recognizable to audiences during the late 1960s. While Louis Armstrong was briefly considered for the part, the filmmakers quickly steered away from that direction upon realizing the racist implications.

In 2019, Disney added disclaimers warning of "outdated cultural depictions" at the start of the film on Disney+. In January 2021, Disney removed access to the film for child profiles in Disney+, and strengthened the warning message to read:

This program includes negative depictions and/or mistreatment of people or cultures. These stereotypes were wrong then and are wrong now. Rather than remove this content, we want to acknowledge its harmful impact, learn from it and spark conversation to create a more inclusive future together.

However, after Disney received criticism for their more aggressive treatment of their classic titles, in 2025 the warning was significantly shortened and the movie is available on G rated profiles that are not set to "Junior Mode".

== Legacy ==
Since its original release in 1967, The Jungle Book has been widely acclaimed by the animation industry, with animators such as Brad Bird, Andreas Deja, Glen Keane, and Sergio Pablos citing the film to be their inspiration for entering the business; Eric Goldberg also declared that the film "boasts possibly the best character animation a studio has ever done." The character design and art direction of The Jungle Book heavily influenced the animators of Aladdin (1992), The Lion King (1994), Tarzan (1999), and Lilo & Stitch (2002) in creating animal characters for each of these films. Elements of The Jungle Book were recycled in the later Disney feature film Robin Hood (1973), such as Baloo being inspiration for Little John (who not only was a bear, but also voiced by Phil Harris); in particular, the dance sequence between Baloo and King Louie was rotoscoped for Little John and Lady Cluck's dance.

In 1968, Jimmy Johnson approached Larry Clemmons to write a sequel to The Jungle Book for a story-telling record; the album, titled More Jungle Book... Further Adventures Of Baloo And Mowgli, was released by Disneyland Records the following year, with Phil Harris and Louis Prima reprising their film roles. In 2003, DisneyToon Studios released a theatrical sequel to the original film, The Jungle Book 2; screenwriter Robert Reece also pitched the idea of a third film to Disney executives in 2005, but the project never materialized.

In 1978, a live-action sketch titled The Wonderful World of Ernie from Morecambe and Wise parodied "I Wan'na Be Like You (The Monkey Song)" by doing a full reenactment of the scene with sets and costumes and lip-synching to the song's original recording (including the characters' spoken dialogue in the middle of the song). The sketch starred Danny Rolnick as Mowgli, Derek Griffiths as Bagheera, Eric Morecambe as Baloo and Ernie Wise as King Louie.

The characters from the film have also appeared on animated television series such as TaleSpin (1990–91) and Jungle Cubs (1996–98), which functioned as a prequel that told the stories of Baloo, Hahti, Bagheera, Louie, Kaa, and Shere Khan when they were children. In 1994, Disney released a live-action adaptation which was more of a realistic action-adventure film with somewhat more adult themes. The film differs more from the book than its animated counterpart, having been an independent film to which Disney acquired distribution rights in exchange for them providing half of the film's budget and funding. The film received positive reviews from critics and was a box-office success. While Disney was not involved in the film's prequel, they produced a direct to video film entitled The Jungle Book: Mowgli's Story. A new live-action version of The Jungle Book was released by Disney in 2016, which even reused most of the songs of the animated film, with some lyrical reworking by original composer Richard M. Sherman.

There are two video games based on the film: The Jungle Book was a platformer released in 1993 for Master System, Mega Drive, Game Gear, Super NES, Game Boy and PC. A version for the Game Boy Advance was later released in 2003. The Jungle Book Groove Party was a dance mat game released in 2000 for PlayStation and PlayStation 2. Kaa and Shere Khan have also made cameo appearances in another Disney video game, QuackShot. A world based on the film was intended to appear more than once in the Square Enix-Disney Kingdom Hearts video game series, but was omitted both times, first in the first game because it featured a similar world based on Tarzan, and second in Kingdom Hearts: Birth by Sleep, although areas of the world are accessible via hacking codes. Baloo and Mowgli appear as interactive characters in Adventureland on Kinect: Disneyland Adventures released in 2011 and re-released in 2017. Mowgli, Bagheera, Baloo, Shere Khan and King Louie appear as playable characters in the video game Disney Magic Kingdoms. Baloo appears as a playable character in Disney Mirrorverse released in 2022. Baloo and Mowgli appear as a playable characters in the kart racing game Disney Speedstorm released in 2022. Since the film's release, many of the film's characters appeared in House of Mouse, The Lion King 1½, Who Framed Roger Rabbit, and Aladdin and the King of Thieves. In December 2010, a piece of artwork by British artist Banksy featuring The Jungle Book characters which had been commissioned by Greenpeace to help raise awareness of deforestation went on sale for the sum of £80,000.

=== Exhibition ===
A behind-the-scenes exhibition titled Walt Disney's The Jungle Book: Making a Masterpiece, guest-curated by Andreas Deja, took place at The Walt Disney Family Museum from June 23, 2022, to January 8, 2023. The event celebrated the film's 55th anniversary by displaying over 600 pieces of rare artwork, manuscripts, photos, animation drawings and cels as well as ephemera. It also detailed the entire story of the film's production, its release and the worldwide recognition it has earned through the years. A Members Only Preview which included a special talk with Andreas Deja, Bruce Reitherman, Darleen Carr and Floyd Norman took place on June 22, 2022. An extensive companion book, Walt Disney's The Jungle Book: Making a Masterpiece, also written by Deja, was originally slated to be published by Weldon Owen on September 20, 2022, before it was changed to November 1.

Special screenings of the film took place at the museum's theater from July 2 to July 31, 2022.

== See also ==
- 1967 in film
- List of American films of 1967
- List of animated feature films of the 1960s
- List of Disney theatrical animated features
- List of highest-grossing animated films
- List of highest-grossing films
- List of highest-grossing films in France
- List of Walt Disney Pictures films

== Notes ==
1. In 2003, Variety listed the worldwide gross for The Jungle Book at $378 million. It also listed the North American gross at $128 million, which is lower than the reported estimate at $141 million.

== Bibliography ==
- Barrier, Michael (1999). Hollywood Cartoons: American Animation in Its Golden Age. Oxford: Oxford University Press. ISBN 978-0-1980-2079-0.
- Barrier, Michael (2007). The Animated Man: A Life of Walt Disney. Berkeley, California: University of California Press. ISBN 978-0-5202-5619-4.
- Beck, Jerry (2005). The Animated Movie Guide. Chicago Review Press. ISBN 978-1-5565-2591-9.
- Deja, Andreas (2022). Walt Disney's The Jungle Book: Making a Masterpiece. Richmond, California: Weldon Owen. ISBN 978-1-6818-8893-4.
- Hollis, Tim; Ehrbar, Greg (2011). Mouse Tracks: The Story of Walt Disney Records. Jackson, Mississippi: University Press of Mississippi. ISBN 978-1-578068-49-4.
- Johnson, Jimmy (2014). Inside the Whimsy Works: My Life with Walt Disney Productions. Jackson, Mississippi: University Press of Mississippi. ISBN 978-1-6170-3930-0.
- Koenig, David (1997). Mouse Under Glass: Secrets of Disney Animation & Theme Parks. Aliso Viejo, California: Bonaventure Press. ISBN 978-0-9640-6051-7.
- Maltin, Leonard (1995). The Disney Films. Glendale, California: Disney Editions. ISBN 978-0-7868-8527-5.
- Norman, Floyd (2013). Animated Life: A Lifetime of Tips, Tricks, Techniques and Stories from a Disney Legend. Boca Raton, Florida: CRC Press. ISBN 978-1-1361-2637-6.
- Peet, Bill (1989). Bill Peet: An Autobiography. Boston: Houghton Mifflin Harcourt. ISBN 978-0-3956-8982-0.
- Smith, Dave (2012). Disney Trivia from the Vault: Secrets Revealed and Questions Answered. Glendale, California: Disney Editions. ISBN 978-1-4231-7857-6.
- Thomas, Frank; Johnston, Ollie (1981). Disney Animation: The Illusion of Life. New York City: Abbeville Press. ISBN 978-0-7868-6070-8.
- Thomas, Bob (1997). Disney's Art of Animation: From Mickey Mouse to Hercules. Glendale, California: Disney Editions. ISBN 978-0-7868-6241-2.
- Webb, Graham (2011). The Animated Film Encyclopedia: A Complete Guide to American Shorts, Features and Sequences, 1900-1999. Jefferson, North Carolina: McFarland & Company. ISBN 978-0-7864-4985-9.
- Williams, Pat; Denney, James (2004). How to Be Like Walt: Capturing the Disney Magic Every Day of Your Life. Deerfield Beach, Florida: Health Communications Inc. ISBN 978-0-7573-0231-2.
