= The Second Jungle Book: Mowgli & Baloo =

Rudyard Kipling's The Second Jungle Book: Mowgli & Baloo
- Theatrical release poster
- Directed by: Dee McLachlan (Note: Credited as Duncan McLachlan.)
- Written by: Bayard Johnson; Matthew Horton
- Based on: The Jungle Book by Rudyard Kipling
- Produced by: Raju Patel; Mark Damon
- Starring: Billy Campbell; Roddy McDowall; Jamie Williams; David Paul Francis
- Cinematography: Adolfo Bartoli
- Edited by: Marcus Manton
- Music by: John Scott
- Production companies: Kiplinbook; Raju Productions; MDP Worldwide
- Distributed by: TriStar Pictures (through Sony Pictures Releasing)
- Release date: May 16, 1997
- Running time: 90 minutes
- Country: United States
- Language: English
- Box office: $346,056

Rudyard Kipling's The Second Jungle Book: Mowgli & Baloo is a 1997 American adventure film produced by MDP Worldwide and released by TriStar Pictures, and functions as a prequel to Rudyard Kipling's The Jungle Book (1994). While the film is named after The Second Jungle Book (which the 1994 film adapted), the film is actually a live action adaption of the original book, adapted for the screen by Bayard Johnson and Matthew Horton. The film stars Jamie Williams as Mowgli, with Roddy McDowall and Billy Campbell in supporting roles.

It was shot in Kandy Central Hills, Sri Lanka in July to September 1996 and features some well known Sri Lankan actors like Wijeratne Warakagoda, Sunil Hettiarachchi and Raja Sumanapala.

== Plot ==
10-year-old Mowgli has been raised amongst a wolf pack as well as Baloo the bear and Bagheera the panther in the Jungles of India. Mowgli is the target of the notorious bandar-log (monkey people) who frequently attempt to kidnap him to teach them the ways of man. However, his greatest enemy is Shere Khan the tiger, who killed the boy's father.

Mowgli is soon spotted by an American traveler named Harrison, who wishes to take the man-cub to his circus in America. Mowgli escapes from Harrison and brings along Timo, the pet monkey of Harrison's companion named Chuchundra. Harrison enlists the help of a wealthy man named Buldeo to help him find Mowgli. Buldeo is none other than Mowgli's paternal uncle - Mowgli is the rightful heir to his father's inheritance. For this reason, Buldeo seeks a snake charmer named Karait who owns Kaa the python, in order to kill Mowgli, pretending to use the snake to simply track the boy.

Mowgli is banished by the wolves for bringing home Timo, who is believed to be a cousin of the bandar-log. Timo is later kidnapped by the bandar-log - Baloo and Mowgli arrive at the Ancient City, the home of the bandar-log to save Timo but Baloo is trapped in the process. Harrison, Buldeo, Karait and Chuchundra successfully capture Mowgli and bring him to their camp. At night, Shere Khan attacks the camp and Mowgli escapes when fighting him off. However, he is ambushed by Buldeo who attempts to kill him but fails thanks to Harrison's intervention. Baloo escapes from the bandar-log and rescues Mowgli. The two then return to the Ancient City and manage to save Timo whilst encountering King Murphy who wishes to make Mowgli king. The four men arrive at the Ancient City and split up to find Mowgli. Harrison attempts to help Mowgli, along with Timo who are down in a temple with cobras, after having escaped from King Murphy and the Bandar-log, but is injured by Buldeo who finally reveals his true intentions of wanting to murder his nephew. He prevents Mowgli's escape from the temple by cutting the rope that he used to attempt to climb out, leaving his helpless nephew alone to face the cobras.

Buldeo is confronted by Baloo and Bagheera, who arrive with the wolves to help Mowgli. He hides in a canon which is lit by the bandar-log, sending him flying into the jungle where he is confronted by Shere Khan. Meanwhile, Mowgli is rescued by Karait and Harrison, who used Kaa to get the boy out of the cobras' temple, and returns Timo to Chuchundra. King Murphy tries again to get Mowgli to stay and rule the city, but realizes that Mowgli is leaving and bids him goodbye, telling him that one day he will find his place in the world. Harrison offers to take Mowgli back to raise him as his own by offering him a home in the United States, having changed his mind about wanting the boy to be living in a circus. Mowgli instead decides to run with the wolves with Harrison and Chuchundra bidding him farewell.

== Cast ==
- Bill Campbell as Harrison
- Roddy McDowall as King Murphy
- Jamie Williams as Mowgli
- David Paul Francis as Chuchundra
- Gulshan Grover as Buldeo
- Dyrk Ashton as Karait
- Amy Robbins as Molly Ward
- Albert Moses as Conductor
- Cornelia Hayes O'Herlihy as Emily Reece
- B. J. Hogg as Colonel Reece
- Hal Fowler as Captain Ward
- Simon Barker as Train Official
- Raja Sumanapala as Buldeo's Servant

== Reception ==
The film mostly received negative reviews from critics. McDowall was nominated for Worst Supporting Actor for this film at the 1997 Stinkers Bad Movie Awards but lost to Jon Voight for Anaconda.

== Soundtrack ==
The Second Jungle Book: Mowgli & Baloo (Original Motion Picture Soundtrack)

Film score by John Scott
- Released: 1997
- Genre: Soundtrack
- Length: 68:36
- Label: JOS Records

The Second Jungle Book: Mowgli & Baloo (Original Motion Picture Soundtrack)
No.	Title	Length
1.	"Main Title"	3:03
2.	"Pursued By Bogh And One Eye"	3:23
3.	"The Harmony Of The Jungle"	3:08
4.	"Shere Khan On The Prowl"	2:21
5.	"The Train Adventure"	3:42
6.	"Mowgli and Timo Go Hunting"	3:44
7.	"The Blue Danube (Strauss)"	1:36
8.	"The Bandar-Log"	1:03
9.	"Chimps On A Roll"	2:00
10.	"Peaceful Night"	1:17
11.	"Banished From The Wolf Cave"	2:58
12.	"Terror In The Lost City"	6:17
13.	"Captured By Kaa"	3:02
14.	"Circus Life"	2:53
15.	"Chasing The Tiger"	2:01
16.	"Baloo Rescues Mowgli From The Cage"	2:01
17.	"Finding Timo"	1:05
18.	"King Murphy's Court"	3:38
19.	"In The Temple Of The Cobras"	4:30
20.	"Crack Shot Buldeo Misses Again"	1:00
21.	"Animals To The Rescue"	3:30
22.	"Snake Lift"	3:19
23.	"Buldeo Gets Fired From A Cannon"	2:54
24.	"Harmony Returns To The Jungle"	4:11
Total length:		68:36
