= Stefan Kalipha =

British actor (born 1940)

- Born: Stephen Siegfried Behrendt; 1940 (age 85–86); Trinidad
- Other name: Stephen Kalipha
- Education: East 15 Acting School
- Occupation: Actor
- Years active: 1970–present
- Family: Horace Ové (cousin)

Stefan Kalipha (born Stephen Siegfried Behrendt, 1940) is a Trinidad-born British actor who has been active since about 1970. He played Ramon, the Cigar Factory Foreman in the film Cuba (1979), Daoud in The Curse of King Tut's Tomb and Fat Larry in Babylon (both 1980). He also appeared as Hector González, a Cuban hitman, in the James Bond film For Your Eyes Only (1981). Kalipha's other film roles include Wali Dad in The Crucifer of Blood (1991) and Buldeo in The Jungle Book (1994).

His television roles include Quiller, episode: "Objective Caribbean" and Tales of the Unexpected, episode: "The Finger of Suspicion".

== Early life ==
Stefan Kalipha was born Stephen Siegfried Behrendt in Trinidad in 1940 and spent his childhood in Port of Spain. He is of Indian, African, Portuguese, and German descent. He grew up with fellow creatives Horace Ové, his cousin, and Mustapha Matura, his best friend. Kalipha moved to England in 1959 and studied at East 15 Acting School. He took on his grandfather's name Kalipha.

== Career ==
=== Television ===
In 1970, Kalipha played the part of Casey in an episode of the drama series Callan, entitled "Amos Green Must Live". The role was of a disenfranchised young black man in London who had reached a tipping point about working, even though he had "five A levels and five O levels".

In 1977, Kalipha played the part of Reverend Henry Paul in a television series pilot called Meadowlark. It was a sitcom, based in Brixton, about a black married couple who were sharing their flat with an Irish woman. The 36-minute pilot, which also starred Oscar James, Joan Ann Maynard and Nina Baden-Semper, was never broadcast.

Kalipha was Stanley in the 1985 BBC TV production of Mustapha Matura's play Playboy of the West Indies, a role he repeated at the Court Theatre, Chicago in 1988.

In 1992, Kalipha had a recurring role as Jonathan Phelps in the series Prime Suspect.

In 2015, he appeared as Tobias in The Bastard Executioner.

=== Film ===
Kalipha's character Hector Gonzalez in the 1981 James Bond film For Your Eyes Only masquerades as a plane pilot who has the intention of killing British agent Sir Timothy Havelock and his family. In 1983, Kalipha appeared as the Data School Instructor in Superman III. In 1989, he played the part of the Hatay tank gunner in Indiana Jones and the Last Crusade.

=== Stage ===
As Ahmed, an efficient tour agent smoothing over the repercussions of violence among holidaymakers in a Moroccan tour villa, Kalipha appeared on stage in E. A. Whitehead's Mecca, presented at the Open Space Theatre, London, in 1977.

== Personal life ==
Kalipha lives in Primrose Hill, London.

== Filmography and theatre ==
Year	Title	Role	Notes
1971	Hine	Mbusa	2 episodes
1971	The Rivals of Sherlock Holmes	Rameau	Episode: The Affair of the Tortoise
1972	Ace of Wands	Drum	3 episodes
1977	Jesus of Nazareth	Melchior's Aide	Uncredited, Miniseries
1977	Black Joy	Sharp Eddie	
1977	Mecca	Ahmed	Open Space Theatre
1979	Cuba	Ramon, Cigar Factory Foreman	
1979	A Nightingale Sang in Berkeley Square	Ibrahim	
1980	The Curse of King Tut's Tomb	Daoud	
1980	Babylon	Fat Larry	
1981	For Your Eyes Only	Hector Gonzalez	
1982	Young Sherlock: The Mystery of the Manor House	The Munshi	Episode: A Singular Thorn (Uncredited)
1983	Superman III	Data School Instructor	
1985	Water	Cuban #1	
1985	Playboy of the West Indies	Stanley	BBC TV
1987	Born of Fire	Bilal	
1987	Playing Away	Louis	
1988	Playboy of the West Indies	Stanley	Court Theatre (Chicago)
1988	Tales of the Unexpected	Chief Inspector Aziz	Episode: The Finger of Suspicion
1989	Scandal	Hanif	
1989	Indiana Jones and the Last Crusade	Hatay Tank Gunner	
1991	The Bill	Curtiss	Episode: Every Mother's Son
1992	Missing Pieces	Man	Uncredited
1993-2017	Casualty	Joseph Watson/Javed Barazani	2 episodes
1994	The Jungle Book	Buldeo	
1996	Gulliver's Travels	Laputa Intellectual	Miniseries
2000	Arabian Nights	Abu Nouz	Miniseries
2002	Ali G Indahouse	Iranian Delegate	
2002	The Sum of All Fears	Arab Gravedigger	
2006	The Ten Commandments	Chief Minister	Miniseries
2006	The Nativity Story	Saint Caspar	
2006	Gate to Heaven	Schlepper	
2011	Mesocafé	Saleem	
2015	River	Omari Tadros	Miniseries (2 episodes)
2016	Alice Through the Looking Glass	Maharaja	Uncredited
2019	Aladdin	Imam	
2019	Men in Black: International	Antique Shopkeeper	
2019	The Good Liar	Roger	Uncredited
