= A Man Called Sloane =

American television series

- Genre: Drama
- Created by: Cliff Gould
- Starring: Robert Conrad; Dan O'Herlihy; Ji-Tu Cumbuka
- Voices of: Michele Carey
- Theme music composer: Patrick Williams
- Country of origin: United States
- Original language: English
- No. of seasons: 1
- No. of episodes: 12

Production
- Executive producer: Philip Saltzman
- Producer: Gerald Sanford
- Running time: 60 minutes
- Production companies: Woodruff Productions; QM Productions

Original release
- Network: NBC
- Release: September 22 – December 22, 1979

A Man Called Sloane is an American secret agent adventure television series that aired on NBC during the 1979–1980 television season. It was a Woodruff Production in association with QM Productions and became the final series produced by Quinn Martin's company to debut. (Note: Barnaby Jones was the last remaining QM program to be cancelled, in 1980.) A Man Called Sloane was an amalgam of elements from numerous spy series of the previous 15 years, including The Man from U.N.C.L.E., Mission: Impossible, and Conrad's own The Wild Wild West. (Note: Michele Carey previously had appeared as a guest star in an episode of The Wild Wild West.) One of the more expensive series produced during the season, it failed to gain an audience and was cancelled after 12 episodes were broadcast. It is also one of only three QM series not to have an announcer accompanying the opening titles, (Note: The others were Quinn Martin's Tales of the Unexpected and Most Wanted.) one of two not to display a copyright notice at the beginning but rather at the end, (Note: The other was 12 O'Clock High.) and the only one not to have a "Tonight's Episode" card or the "Act I/II/III/IV/Epilog" formatting—the episode titles still appear onscreen, but they appear as part of the episode credits rather than during the standard opening.

== Synopsis ==
The series starred Robert Conrad as Thomas R. Sloane III, a freelance spy who takes on occasional assignments for UNIT, a secret American intelligence operation run by The Director, played by Dan O'Herlihy. Unlike nearly all the other stars of series produced by QM Productions, Conrad was billed above the title. (Note: Robert Forster was the only other person to receive such an honor as Banyon.) The secret entrance to UNIT headquarters was through a toy store. KARTEL was the evil secret organization that was UNIT's nemesis. Aiding Sloane's missions was Torque, his deadly right-hand man played by Ji-Tu Cumbuka. Torque had a mechanical hand with interchangeable parts (drill, saw blade, etc.) that often helped during their assignments. The pair was also assisted by Effie, a computer voiced by Michele Carey.

== Related media ==
On March 5, 1981, NBC aired a TV movie, Death Ray 2000, which was actually the original pilot for the series. The movie starred Robert Logan as Sloane and Cumbuka played Torque as a villain. (Note: Footage of this version of Torque attacking Sloane was included in the opening credits of the TV series.) Logan was originally supposed to play Sloane on the series, but Fred Silverman stated he did not like Logan and wanted Robert Conrad.

== Episodes ==
No.	Title	Directed by	Written by	Original release date	Prod. code
1	"Night of the Wizard"	Alan J. Levi	Peter Allan Fields	September 22, 1979	9027-7904
2	"The Seduction Squad"	Michael Preece	Stephen Kandel	September 29, 1979	9027-7901
3	"Tuned for Destruction"	Elizabeth Lindberg	Dick Nelson	October 6, 1979	9027-7905
4	"Masquerade of Terror"	Michael Preece	B.W. Sandefur	October 13, 1979	9027-7903
5	"Demon's Triangle"	Michael Preece	Jimmy Sangster	October 20, 1979	9027-7906
6	"The Venus Microbe"	Winrich Kolbe	Story by : Marc Brandel; Teleplay by : Peter Allan Fields & Jack V. Fogarty & Gerald Sanford	October 27, 1979	9027-7907
7	"Collision Course"	Elizabeth Lindberg & Ray Austin	Stephen Kandel	November 17, 1979	9027-7909
8	"Samurai"	Elizabeth Lindberg	Dick Nelson	November 24, 1979	9027-7908
9	"Sweethearts of Disaster"	Jack Starrett	Pat Dunlop & Rich Meyer	December 1, 1979	9027-7910
10	"Lady Bug"	Michael Preece	Jack V. Fogarty	December 8, 1979	9027-7902
11	"Architect of Evil"	Lewis Teague	Don Ingalls	December 15, 1979	9027-7911
12	"The Shangri-La Syndrome"	Robert Conrad	Patrick Mathews	December 22, 1979	9027-7912
