= Renee Griffin =

American actress

- Born: Long Beach, California
- Other name: Renee Allman
- Occupation: Actress

Renee Griffin is an American actress.

== Career ==
Griffin was a regular cast member on the ABC soap Port Charles, playing the part of Danielle Ashley from 1997 to 1998. In 2001, she appeared on the TV series Black Scorpion as the villain Aerobicide.

Griffin is best known for her role as Lanie in the cult favorite stoner film, The Stoned Age (1994), and as Angel who was decapitated in the 1991 action movie Showdown in Little Tokyo.

Griffin has guest-starred on High Tide, Dangerous Women, Eye on L.A., and on CSI: Crime Scene Investigation.

== Personal life ==
Griffin has been married to actor James Marshall since 8 May 1998. They have one child.

In her spare time, she is a naturopath and runs an online store called Bee Beautiful Bee which supplies skin care products.

== Filmography ==
=== Film ===
Year	Title	Role	Notes
1990	Hollywood Boulevard II	Camilla	
1991	Showdown in Little Tokyo	Angel Mueller	
1992	Encino Man	Fresh Nug	
1993	Cyborg 2	Dreena	Direct-to-video
1994	The Stoned Age	Lanie	
1994	Death Match	Danielle Richardson	
1995	Number One Fan	Blair Madsen	
1996	The Great White Hype	Angel	
1996	Scene of the Crime	Jennifer	
1997	Criminal Affairs	Robin	
2000	Doomsday Man	Jill	

=== Television ===
Year	Title	Role	Notes
1995	Joe Bob's Drive-In Theater	Lanie	Archival footage
1996	High Tide	Tracy Donaldson	Episode: "University Blues: Part 1"
1997	Port Charles	Danielle Ashley	57 episodes
2001	Black Scorpion	Suzy Pain / Aerobicide	Episode: "No Sweat"
2004	CSI: Crime Scene Investigation	Laurel Trent	Episode: "Early Rollout"
2008	Eve	Governor's wife	
