= The Jungle Book (1994 film) =

Film by Stephen Sommers

Rudyard Kipling's The Jungle Book
- Theatrical release poster by John Alvin
- Directed by: Stephen Sommers
- Screenplay by: Stephen Sommers; Ronald Yanover; Mark Geldman
- Story by: Ronald Yanover; Mark Geldman
- Based on: The Jungle Book and The Second Jungle Book by Rudyard Kipling
- Produced by: Edward S. Feldman; Raju Patel
- Starring: Jason Scott Lee; Cary Elwes; Lena Headey; Sam Neill; John Cleese; Stefan Kalipha
- Cinematography: Juan Ruiz Anchía
- Edited by: Bob Ducsay
- Music by: Basil Poledouris
- Production companies: Vegahom Europe; Baloo Productions; Jungle Book Films
- Distributed by: Buena Vista Pictures Distribution (Note: Distributed by Buena Vista Pictures Distribution under the Walt Disney Pictures banner.) (Select territories); MDP Worldwide (International)
- Release date: December 25, 1994
- Running time: 111 minutes
- Country: United States
- Language: English
- Budget: $15-30 million
- Box office: $70 million

Rudyard Kipling's The Jungle Book, also known as The Jungle Book, is a 1994 American adventure film co-written and directed by Stephen Sommers, produced by Edward S. Feldman and Raju Patel, from a story by Ronald Yanover and Mark Geldman. An independent production funded by MDP Worldwide, the film's distribution rights were acquired by Buena Vista Pictures in most territories in exchange for Disney providing half of the film's overall budget. The film is based on the Mowgli stories from The Jungle Book (1894) and The Second Jungle Book (1895) by Rudyard Kipling, but mostly focuses on the plotline of the second book. It also adapts some elements from Walt Disney's 1967 animated adaptation, like the appearance of King Louie, a character created for said film, or the character Kaa acting as an antagonist instead of an ally like in the books. Unlike the books and the 1967 animated film, the animal characters in this film do not talk.

The film stars Jason Scott Lee, Cary Elwes, Lena Headey, Sam Neill, and John Cleese. Released on December 25, 1994, the film received generally positive reviews and grossed $70 million worldwide against a $30 million budget.

== Plot ==
During the British Raj, Mowgli is the five-year-old son of Nathoo, a widowed guide who is guiding an expedition in the Indian jungle for fellow widower Colonel Geoffrey Brydon, his five-year-old daughter, Kitty, and Brydon's friend, Dr. Julius Plumford. Shere Khan the Bengal tiger begins stalking the group when fellow guide Buldeo and two other soldiers kill some animals for sport, which is against the jungle law. Shere Khan attacks the camp at night, killing the two soldiers and Nathoo, who dies trying to fight him off to defend Buldeo.

In the chaos, Mowgli and his wolf cub, Grey Brother, are separated and presumed dead. Mowgli meets Bagheera the panther who leads him to the wolf pack, and also befriends bear cub Baloo. Years later, a rhesus macaque steals a bracelet from Mowgli, which Kitty had given to him when they were children. Mowgli chases the macaque to an ancient abandoned city honoring Hanuman which hosts piles of treasure, ruled by an orangutan, King Louie. Mowgli battles and subdues Kaa the royal python using a dagger and is given the bracelet back by Louie.

Meanwhile, Kitty still resides in India with Brydon. Venturing into the jungle, she meets Mowgli again and does not recognize him, though she sees his virtues. Mowgli also encounters Captain William Boone, Kitty's suitor, who perceives the animalistic Mowgli as a threat. Mowgli arrives in Kitty's village, and she recognizes him after seeing the bracelet. Mowgli is pursued by Boone; after a chase, he is caught by Buldeo, who recognizes Mowgli's dagger as being from the legendary city of Hanuman. Boone and his men imprison Mowgli and torture him in an attempt to find out where he obtained the dagger. Kitty informs her father that the prisoner is Mowgli, though Brydon remains skeptical; Kitty and Plumford attempt to reintroduce Mowgli to the world of man. Boone learns from Buldeo and his friend Tabaqui about the lost city and attempts to persuade Mowgli to show him the way. However, Mowgli refuses, citing that Boone does not keep the jungle law by killing animals for his own amusement.

Brydon later announces that Boone and Kitty are to be married. A heartbroken Mowgli returns to the jungle after Boone and his men treat him poorly; Kitty refuses to marry Boone following this, enabling Brydon to send her back to England. Boone, desperate to find the treasure, recruits fellow soldiers Wilkins and Harley, and they team up with Buldeo and Tabaqui. They attempt to capture Mowgli but fail and Baloo is shot while defending Mowgli.

The men later ambush Kitty and her father with the help of bandits, who later are attacked by Bagheera and the wolves and Brydon is shot in the leg. The would-be treasure hunters hold Kitty and Brydon hostage as leverage for Mowgli to lead them to the treasure. At night, Shere Khan returns; Mowgli promises to protect Kitty and Brydon from him and escapes the next morning with Bagheera's aid. Harley gives chase, only to fall into quicksand and drown. The party continues their journey, Boone leaving behind a wounded Brydon, who is helped back to the village on an Indian elephant courtesy of Mowgli. Later, Tabaqui decides that Mowgli is no longer needed and tries to murder him, only to die after falling from a cliff. As they reach the city, Wilkins becomes separated from the group and is mauled to death by Shere Khan. Inside the city, Buldeo attempts to shoot Mowgli but is entombed in a booby trap. Boone and Kitty make it to the treasure room, where Boone tries to kill Mowgli with a sword, though Mowgli slashes his arm with a dagger and escapes with Kitty. Boone gathers treasure for himself, however his victory is cut short when Kaa kills him.

Outside the ruins, Mowgli and Kitty are confronted by Shere Khan who roars at Mowgli. Mowgli roars back and Shere Khan sees him as a creature of the jungle, fulfilling a childhood dream of Mowgli's. Returning to the jungle, Mowgli and Kitty are delighted to find that both the lives of Brydon and Baloo have been saved by Plumford. Mowgli becomes lord of the jungle and begins a romantic relationship with Kitty.

== Cast ==
- Jason Scott Lee as Mowgli, a wild man who was orphaned at 5 years old and was raised by the animals in the jungle of India.
  - Sean Naegeli as 5-year-old Mowgli
- Cary Elwes as Captain William Boone, Kitty's suitor and a vicious big game hunter who desires the wealth of the ancient ruins and leads a mutiny in search of it.
- Lena Headey as Katherine "Kitty" Brydon, the virtuous daughter of Geoffrey Brydon who is also the childhood friend and romantic interest of Mowgli.
  - Joanna Wolff as 5-year-old Kitty
- Sam Neill as Colonel Geoffrey Brydon, Kitty's firm but reasonable father who is the head of the British battalion stationed in India. He is also the narrator of the film.
- John Cleese as Dr. Julius Plumford, Colonel Brydon's friend who is the medical professional of Brydon's battalion and who assists Kitty in teaching Mowgli the ways of mankind.
- Jason Flemyng as Lieutenant John Wilkins, a neurotic soldier in Brydon's battalion and Boone's close friend.
- Stefan Kalipha as Buldeo, an outlaw who knows about the ancient ruins. He is also the man responsible for provoking Shere Khan by poaching and causing the death of Mowgli's father Nathoo.
- Ron Donachie as Sergeant Harley, a brutish soldier who sides with Boone in the mutiny.
- Anirudh Agarwal as Tabaqui, a thuggish jungle guide working for Boone. He shares the same name as a golden jackal in Kipling's stories, who was Shere Khan's henchman.
- Faran Tahir as Nathoo, Mowgli's father who served as a guide for Colonel Brydon until he was killed by Shere Khan. This was also Tahir's film debut.

=== Trained animals ===
- Casey as Baloo, a black bear who was rescued by Mowgli as a cub and his best friend among the animals.
- Shadow as Bagheera, a wise black panther who took Mowgli to be raised by the wolves and watches over him.
- Shannon as Grey Brother, an Indian wolf that Mowgli had since childhood and has been his closest companion.
- Lowell as King Louie, an orangutan who is the leader of a community of monkeys in the ancient ruins.
- Bombay as Shere Khan, a fierce Bengal tiger who is the keeper of the jungle law. Unlike most versions where he is the main villain, this version of the character served as a neutral force of nature in the film.

Kaa is portrayed by both a CGI and an animatronic python, as well as a trained green anaconda. Other trained animals include monkeys, Indian elephants, camels, horses, zebus, and wolves. The sounds used for the monkeys were actually those of chimpanzees and siamangs. KNB FX Group crew member Shannon Shea doubled for Baloo in certain shots in an animatronic bear suit.

== Production ==
=== Pre-production ===
Raju Patel, an Indian producer, figured the 100th anniversary of Kipling's "Jungle Book" stories publication should be commemorated with a film adaptation.

On June 7, 1993, it was announced that The Walt Disney Company had secured distribution rights to the film in the United States, the United Kingdom, alongside Nordics, and Benelux territories as an exchange to allow Disney to provide half of the film's production budget and funding, which was estimated between $15 and $20 million. The Disney deal was later extended to include additional territories such as Latin America, Portugal, Greece and Switzerland. In other countries, MDP Worldwide (Mark Damon's company) was the sales agent for the film rights. MDP pre-sold the film to distributors such as AMLF in France, Roadshow Films in Australia, and Alliance Communications in Canada.

Disney chairman Jeffrey Katzenberg saw the potential of adapting the animated classic and assigned Ronald Yonver and Mark Geldman to write the project. Dissatisfied with these scripts, one of which was 180 pages long with no dialogue for the first 70 pages, Katzenberg handed the project to Stephen Sommers after being satisfied with his work on The Adventures of Huck Finn. Sommers, who is a huge fan of the original animated film and various jungle adventure films, was eager to do a lush, romantic adventure and to show the beauty of the jungle. Executives were stunned by Sommers' decisions for the project as some were expecting an exact recreation of the original animated film and others wanted a teen romance to be the main focus.

=== Casting ===
Jason Scott Lee was Sommers's only choice for Mowgli. Disney executives labeled him as "too old" for the role until Sommers convinced them that he would be a much more believable leading man than an unknown teenager. Lee was also cast because the animals reacted to him the best. Sommers and his crew did try to cast actors in India, but due to Bollywood guidelines, their schedules and limits on the number of films they could work on restricted their involvement. However, they were able to cast Stefan Kalipha and Anirudh Agarwal before they agreed to any Bollywood productions. The casting of Cary Elwes as Captain William Boone, Lena Headey as Kitty Brydon, and Sam Neill as Colonel Geoffrey Brydon soon followed. Neill, in particular, found himself drawn to the role as he comes from a long line of family who served in the British Army during the Raj. The role of Dr. Julius Plumford was always written for John Cleese but Sommers was discouraged that Cleese would never accept it. Cleese agreed to the role after he received the script and fell in love with it. Jason Flemyng made his film debut with this film and his role grew after Sommers instantly bonded with him.

=== Animals ===
For the principal animal actors, a male black bear named Casey was chosen to play a role of Baloo, a male panther named Shadow was chosen to play Bagheera, a purebred female wolf named Shannon was chosen to play Grey Brother, a male tiger named Bombay was chosen to play Shere Khan, and a male orangutan named Lowell was chosen to play King Louie. Lowell was the only animal to play his character all the way through and, according to Sommers, was the easiest and most entertaining animal to work with. Sommers did not want the animal characters to speak like in the animated film and had them perform with the actors and exhibit natural behavior as much as possible. In total, 52 animals including tigers, leopards, bears, wolves, elephants, bulls, monkeys, and horses appear in the film. To film Shere Khan roaring at Mowgli, the tiger was filmed yawning on the set while the roaring sound was prerecorded and dubbed over the yawning in post-production.

=== Filming ===
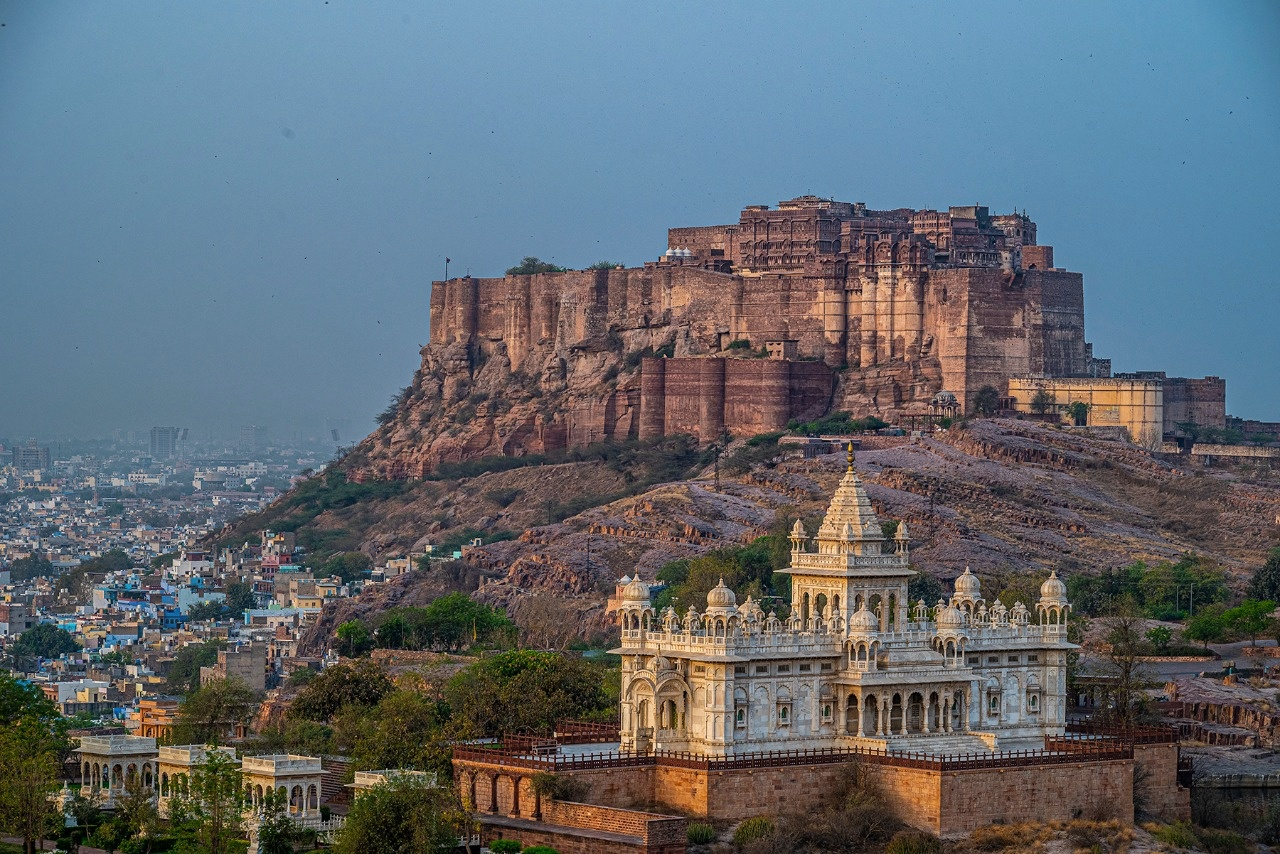
The film was shot in Jodhpur, India.

Filming in Jodhpur in India took eight weeks and included scenes with rhesus macaques and Asian elephants. Indoor scenes like the lost treasure city set were shot on sound stages at the iconic Mehboob Studios in Bombay. The jungles in India did not have the exact rainforest look envisioned by the filmmakers, so the jungle scenes were mostly shot in Fripp Island, South Carolina (scenes featuring Bagheera and Shere Khan) as well as Ozone Falls State Natural Area and Fall Creek Falls State Park in Tennessee (scenes featuring Baloo and the wolf pack). Scenes featuring Lowell were shot in a Los Angeles studio against a blue screen due to the production not being able to bring him to India. One of the Asian elephants in the production was named Shirley, and she lived at Wild Adventures Theme Park in Valdosta, Georgia.

=== Score ===
While electronics dominated most of his work during the early 1990s, composer Basil Poledouris returned to his symphonic roots for his score to the film. Most European versions of Milan's official CD release include "Two Different Worlds", a pop song performed by Kenny Loggins.

The Jungle Book (Original Motion Picture Soundtrack)

Film score by Basil Poledouris
- Released: December 13, 1994
- Genre: Soundtrack
- Length: 48:20
- Label: Milan Records

The Jungle Book (Original Motion Picture Soundtrack)
No.	Title	Length
1.	"Main Titles/The Caravan"	4:24
2.	"Shere Khan Attacks"	4:49
3.	"Mowgli"	3:41
4.	"Monkey City"	4:41
5.	"Kitty"	5:23
6.	"Treasure Room"	4:13
7.	"Civilization"	5:35
8.	"Baloo"	2:52
9.	"Spoils"	9:13
10.	"Finale"	3:29
Total length:		48:20

== Release ==
The film was released in theaters on December 25, 1994.

=== Home media ===
The film was released by Buena Vista Home Entertainment on VHS and LaserDisc on May 19, 1995. Disney also released the film on DVD on January 15, 2002.

== Reception ==
=== Critical response ===
On review aggregator website Rotten Tomatoes, the film received an approval rating of 80% based on 44 reviews, with an average rating of 6.6/10. The site's critical consensus reads: "Rudyard Kipling's The Jungle Book may not hew as closely to the book as its title suggests, but it still offers an entertaining live-action take on a story best known in animated form." On Metacritic, the film has a weighted average score of 63 out of 100 based on 23 critics, indicating "generally favorable reviews".

The film was well received, with praise for its performances, action, and visuals, but it was also chided for not staying true to Kipling's work, even though his name remains in the title. Most notably, Roger Ebert of The Chicago Sun-Times shared this sentiment. He said the film "has so little connection to Rudyard Kipling or his classic book that the title is beyond explanation."

The sweet innocence of Kipling's fables about a boy who learns to live among the animals is replaced here by an "Indiana Jones" clone, an action thriller that Kipling would have viewed with astonishment.

He goes on to say that it is a good film, awarding it three stars out of four, but it does not fit its target audience; some "scenes are unsuitable for small children, and the 'PG' rating is laughable."

Brian Lowry of Variety said that "technically, Jungle Book is an encyclopedia of wonders, from the dazzling scenery (shot largely in Jodhpur, India), cinematography, costumes and sets, to the animals, who frequently out-emote their two-legged counterparts. Even so, Book may have been more effective had its story stayed on one page." Rita Kempley from The Washington Post was more favorable, stating that "the narrative shifts from romance to adventure the way Cheetah used to hop from foot to foot, but Sommers nevertheless delivers a bully family picture."

=== Box office ===
The film grossed $43.2 million in the United States and Canada. Internationally it grossed $27.5 million for a worldwide total of $70.7 million.

=== Accolades ===
The film was nominated for Excellence in Media's 1994 Golden Angel Award for Best Motion Picture. It was also nominated for Best Action, Adventure or Thriller Film at the Saturn Awards.

=== Year-end lists ===
- Honorable mention – Betsy Pickle, Knoxville News-Sentinel
- Top 18 worst (alphabetically listed, not ranked) – Michael Mills, The Palm Beach Post

== Prequel ==
In 1998, MDP Worldwide produced The Second Jungle Book: Mowgli & Baloo, a prequel film that was based on the original book and featured a different cast. Disney was not involved with the production of this film, with MDP instead selling distribution rights in most territories to Sony Pictures Releasing.

== Video game ==
The film was adapted into a 1996 video game, which includes clips from the film, while providing an original story and new characters. The game follows the player in their quest to save the jungle. Soldiers have stolen King Louie's crown and the player must recover it to prevent the jungle from losing its magic. The player is aided by a Scotsman named Ilgwom (portrayed by Gary Schwartz) ("Mowgli" spelled backwards) and his chimpanzee Lahtee, while also guided by a spirit made from Mowgli's memories.
