= Tzila Dagan =

Israeli singer (1946–2004)

- צילה דגן
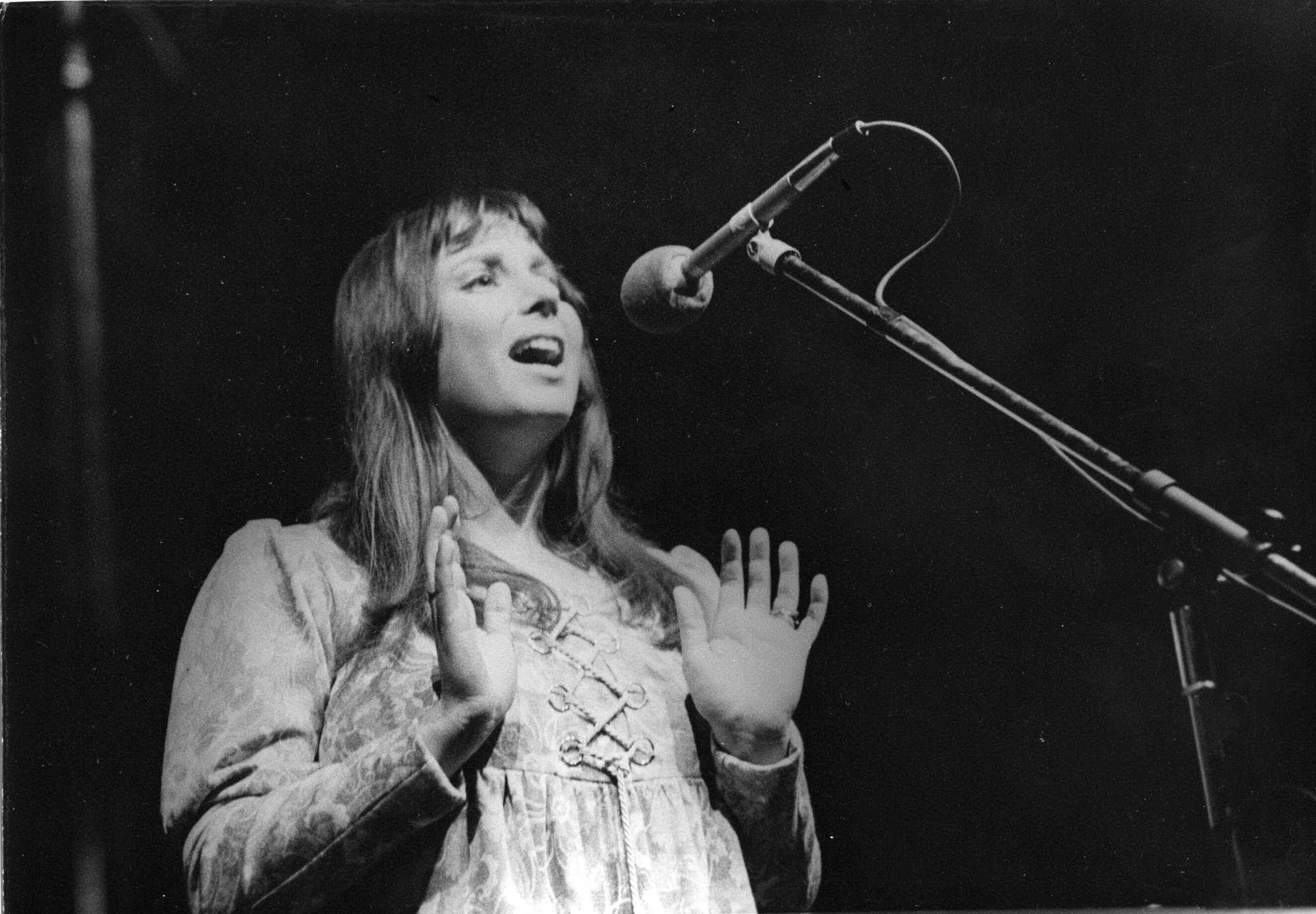
- Dagan in 1972
- Born: Celina Koywski; 18 September 1946; Dzierżoniów, Poland
- Died: 18 April 2004 (aged 57); Ramat Gan, Israel
- Resting place: Yarkon Cemetery
- Occupation: Singer
- Spouse(s): Ezra Dagan (divorced); Yaacov Katzman
- Children: 2
- Musical career
- Genre: folk-pop
- Label: CBS Records International

Tzila Dagan (Hebrew: צילה דגן; 18 September 1946 – 18 April 2004), also spelled Cilla Dagan, was an Israeli singer-songwriter.

== Early life ==
Dagan was born in Dzierżoniów in Poland in 1946. She made aliyah with her family to Israel in 1959. The family settled in Nahariya and she later moved to Tel Aviv. As a teenager, she participated in singing competitions and sang in nightclubs. She served her IDF military service in the Nahal Entertainment Troupe.

== Career ==
Following her release from the army, she joined the "Dizengoff Command Band", which was composed of veterans of military bands. The band put on one entertainment program, directed by Dani Litai, which included various songs and skits. In 1970, she recorded her first solo album, called Tzila Dagan, in which she also performed poetry by Leah Goldberg in song.

In 1970, she participated alongside Danny Messeng and Yair Klinger in the show "Despair Sitting on a Bench", an evening of Jacques Perver's poems translated into Hebrew by Ada Ben Nahum. Later on, they added to their performance three recorded songs under the name "The Trio of Coincidence", including "Ballad for the Calendar," which was a great success, and "Rosa Marzipan". In addition, they also participated in the first children's song festival with the song "Nomi Girl".

At the singer's festival in 1971, she sang Dalia Rabikowitz's song "Dreams of Darkness and Light". In 1974, she participated in the show "Topoh Zahav", an evening of Sasha Argov's songs, in which she sang Alexander Penn's song "Confession" (known for its opening line "My simple coats and a lamp on the bridge"). Later, she recorded with her husband, the actor Ezra Dagan, children's songs ("Bulbul tell me why") and holiday songs ("Masal in Belvivat").

Dagan grew up singing poets' songs, participated in the IDF's Poets' Songs evening programs, in which she performed "Hamda" by Dalia Rabikowitz and "Ari Neori" by David Fogel. She participated in many radio programs on Kol Israel, such as "On the Road, a Tree Stands", Yiddish songs translated into Hebrew, "Balkan Songs" and more.

Dagan's second album, Reunion with Carole King was released in 1977 and included original Carole King songs translated into Hebrew, including "You've Got a Friend", "I Feel the Earth Move" and "Will You Love Me Tomorrow". That year, she performed the songs at a show named for the album. The show included performances of well-known Hebrew songs such as "An Old Love Song" and "There were Nights". In the same year, Dagan participated in the program "A beautiful tropical country", translated Brazilian songs, an album and appeared in a show in which Mati Caspi, Judith Ravitz, Korin Alal and the Suburbs also participated. In the program she sang the song "Help me".

She was a finalist in the Israel Song Festival 1979, with the winner representing Israel at the Eurovision Song Contest 1979. Dagan lost out to Milk and Honey, who went on to win Eurovision with Hallelujah.

In 1980, she participated in the Gali IDF Poets' Songs No. 3 evening, with music composed by Oded Lerer to the words of Yochaved Bat Miriam. In the same year, she participated in the "Balkan Songs" show, produced by Kol Yisrael and translated by Yoram Taharlev. She sang "Yugoslav Winter Song", which was later performed by the Brothers and Sisters Quartet.

In 1981, Dagan gave birth to her daughter Noa, from her second husband, the architect Yaakov Katzman. In 1991, she staged a performance of her best songs and original material, "And the Remaining Drops of Rain", directed by Orna Akad, but she was unable to repeat the successes of the past. She turned to painting and plastic arts.

In 1997, she appeared in the Eytan Fox television series, Florentine. The show follows childhood friends from Jerusalem that move together to Florentin in Tel Aviv. Dagan played Ezra's (Yehezkel Lazarov) mother in the show.

In 2002, a double collection of her poems was published. She appeared with her son, the actor and singer Guy Dagan, and they began working on a joint album.

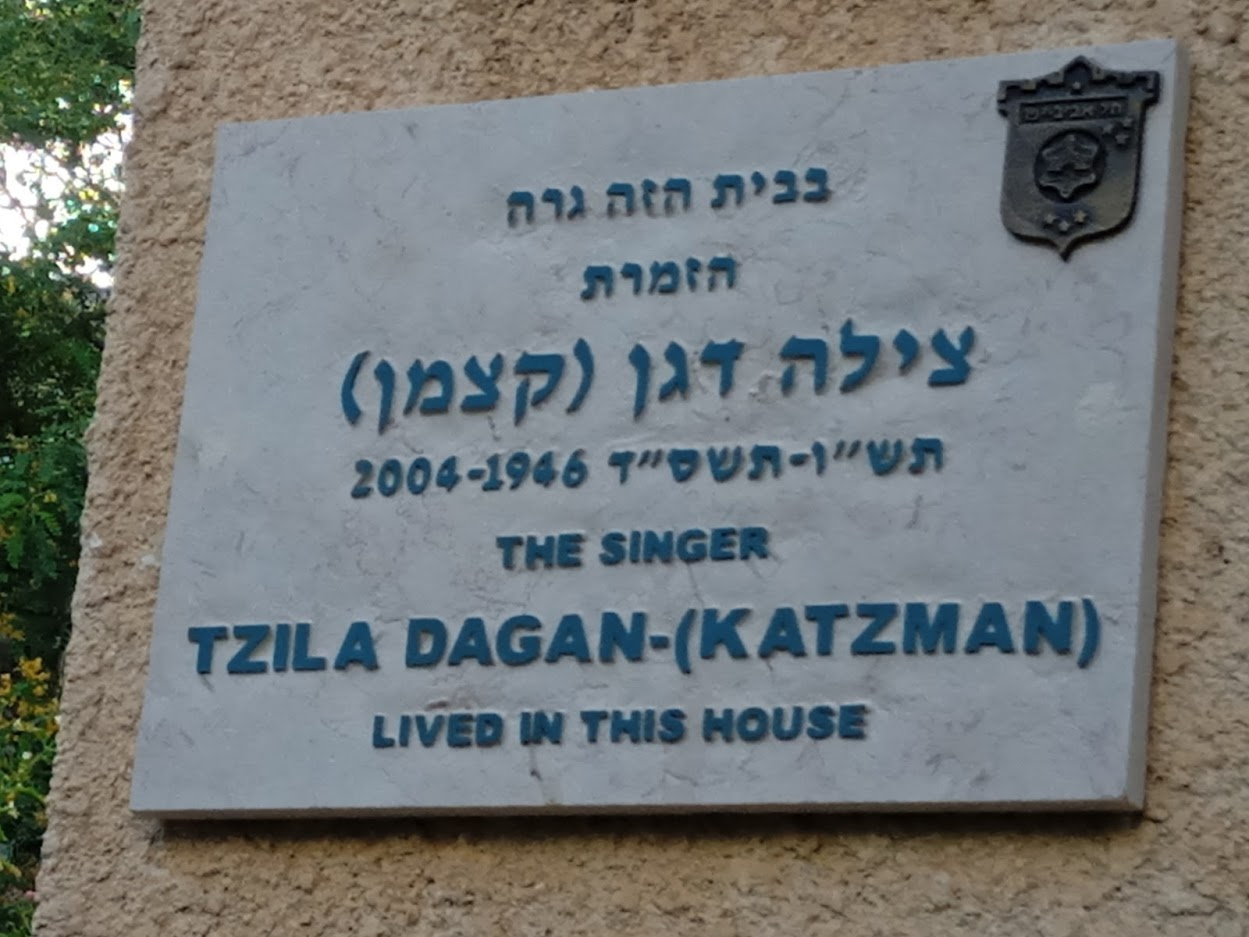
Tzila Dagan memorial plaque

== Personal life ==
She was previously married to the actor, Ezra Dagan. They had a son together, Guy Dagan, an actor and singer. In 1981, Dagan gave birth to her daughter Noa, from her second husband, the architect Yaakov Katzman..

=== Death ===
She died of cancer on 18 April 2004 in Ramat Gan at the age of 57 and was buried at Yarkon Cemetery.

=== Legacy ===
In May 2023, a commemorative plaque was set up at the entrance to her home at 18 Micha Street in Tel Aviv, as part of a project by the Tel Aviv Municipality to commemorate artists and stage people living in Tel Aviv.

She is still listened to in Israel and her songs are occasionally featured on radio shows and podcasts. In 2024, her second album, her translations in Hebrew of Carole King songs was released on Spotify. In Haaretz, the music journalist, Shira Naot wrote: "The album is exciting, distilling the soul poetry that Dagan brought to Israel." Naot lamented how the album was not available on streaming services over the last decade: "which is tantamount to almost inevitable oblivion from the collective memory."
