= Michele Carey =

American actress (1942–2018)

- Carey in trailer for El Dorado (1966)
- Born: Michele Lee Henson; February 26, 1942; Annapolis, Maryland, US
- Died: November 21, 2018 (aged 76); Newport Beach, California, US
- Education: Fort Collins High School
- Occupations: Actress; model
- Years active: 1964–1986
- Known for: El Dorado; Dirty Dingus Magee; Live a Little, Love a Little; The Sweet Ride; Scandalous John
- Spouse: Fred G. Strebel (m. 1999; died 2011)
- Children: 1

Michele Carey (born Michele Lee Henson; February 26, 1942 – November 21, 2018) was an American actress who was best known for her role as Josephine "Joey" MacDonald in the 1966 Western film El Dorado. She appeared in movies and guest-starred in television series in the 1960s and 1970s.

== Early life and education ==
Carey was born on February 26, 1942, in Annapolis, Maryland, to Stanley Willard Henson Jr., and Thelma Burnell Henson; her father was working as a wrestling instructor at the U.S. Naval Academy. The family soon moved to Rochester, Minnesota, where her father continued his medical studies. Carey was a piano prodigy who had appeared on live television in Minneapolis and performed with the Rochester Symphony Orchestra. At age 13, she won gold at the Chicago Music Festival performing Paganini Variations, followed by an encore performance at Soldier Field that "brought down the house."

== Career ==
After graduating from high school, she was signed by the John Robert Powers Agency and moved to Los Angeles in 1964 with her son to pursue a modeling career. She enjoyed success as a model, but she was more interested in acting. Aided by her beauty and trademark long, wild hair, she soon caught the eye of Hollywood producers. In 1964, she made her first television appearance on The Man from U.N.C.L.E. as a receptionist.

The following year, she did more television work, had a small part in the classic beach party film How to Stuff a Wild Bikini (1965), and acted in her first major film, the 1966 Western El Dorado, produced and directed by Howard Hawks, as high-spirited troublemaker Josephine "Joey" MacDonald, acting alongside John Wayne, Robert Mitchum, and James Caan. Carey went on to co-star in films such as the Elvis Presley vehicle Live a Little, Love a Little (1968), The Sweet Ride (1968), Dirty Dingus Magee (1970), starring Frank Sinatra (in which she played an anachronistically miniskirted Indian girl), and the offbeat Disney dramedy Scandalous John (1971) with Brian Keith.

On television, she appeared in guest-starring roles on episodes of The Man from U.N.C.L.E. (1964), Mission Impossible (1969), It Takes a Thief (1970), and three episodes of The Wild Wild West ("The Night of the Feathered Fury", 1967 and the two-part "The Night of the Winged Terror", 1969), the December 1969 episode "Tug-of-War" on The F.B.I., Starsky and Hutch, and Alias Smith and Jones. Carey played the title role in the 1972 Gunsmoke episode "Tara", appeared in the second The Six Million Dollar Man pilot film (1973), and co-starred with Angie Dickinson and Roy Thinnes in the Dan Curtis TV movie The Norliss Tapes that same year. In 1977, she played Belle on one episode of Man from Atlantis. She provided the recurring female computer voice in A Man Called Sloane (1979–80). She also appeared as Crystal in a 1982 episode of the television series The Fall Guy. Carey retired from acting in 1984, but made a brief comeback in the film In the Shadow of Kilimanjaro (1986), which was her last performance.

== Personal life ==
Carey was briefly married to her son's (her only child) father in 1961. She was married again in the early 1970s to the man who would adopt her son. She was also briefly married in the early 1990s to a businessman in New Mexico. Carey's last marriage was with businessman Fred G. Strebel in 1999, and she resided with him in Hillsborough and Rancho Mirage. Strebel died on December 28, 2011.

== Later life and retirement ==
Following her final film appearance in In the Shadow of Kilimanjaro (1986), Carey withdrew from acting and relocated to New Mexico in the 1990s, where she operated an antique store and briefly married a businessman. After marrying Fred G. Strebel in 1999, she returned to California, residing in Hillsborough and Rancho Mirage.

Carey established a successful second career in real estate, buying and renovating properties in Beverly Hills, Hollywood Hills, and Malibu with partner Deryl L. Nation. She also worked as a real estate agent and became known as one of the top agents along the California coast between San Diego and Los Angeles. Despite her business success, she notably never referenced her Hollywood career or film work with clients.

After the September 11 attacks in 2001, Carey refused to fly and would instead drive sixteen hours from Newport Beach to Fort Collins, Colorado to visit her aging parents. She continued making this solo drive well into her seventies, despite concerns from family and friends. While maintaining lifelong friendships with Hollywood figures, including actor Earl Holliman, Carey lived privately and continued receiving fan mail from around the world until her death.

== Death ==
Carey died at the age of 76 on November 21, 2018, of natural causes in Newport Beach, California. Her father, who had been the oldest living NCAA wrestling champion, died earlier the same year, and her mother had died in 2016. Her son Kevin Troy Schwanke also died before her.

== Filmography ==
=== Film ===
| Year | Film | Role | Notes |
|---|---|---|---|
| 1965 | The Spy with My Face | Maggie | |
| 1965 | How to Stuff a Wild Bikini | Michele (uncredited) | |
| 1966 | El Dorado | Josephine "Joey" MacDonald | Western film |
| 1968 | The Sweet Ride | Thumper Stevens | |
| 1968 | Live a Little, Love a Little | Bernice | |
| 1969 | Changes | Julie | |
| 1970 | Five Savage Men | Alice McAndrew | Western film |
| 1970 | Dirty Dingus Magee | Anna Hot Water | |
| 1971 | Scandalous John | Amanda McCanless | |
| 1977 | The Choirboys | Ora Lee Tingle | |
| 1985 | In the Shadow of Kilimanjaro | Ginny Hansen | Action film |

=== Television ===
| Year | Title | Role | Notes |
|---|---|---|---|
| 1964 | The Man from U.N.C.L.E. | Maggie | Episode: "The Double Affair" |
| 1965 | Wendy and Me | Roberta; Rita Talbot; Rita Talbot | Episode: "The Wendy Mob"; Episode: "Danny's Double Life"; Episode: "Wendy's Five Thousand Dollar Chair" |
| 1965 | Burke's Law | Bianca Andrade | Episode: "Balance of Terror" |
| 1966 | T.H.E. Cat | Julie Roth | Episode: "The Ring of Anasis" |
| 1967 | Run for Your Life | Margo | Episode: "Tell It to the Dead" |
| 1967–1969 | The Wild Wild West | Gerda Sharff; Laurette | Episode: "The Night of the Feathered Fury"; Episode: "The Night of the Winged Terror: Part I"; Episode: "The Night of the Winged Terror: Part II" |
| 1969 | The Name of the Game | Evelyn 'Evvy' Trager | Episode: "Blind Man's Bluff" |
| 1969 | Mission: Impossible | Lisa | Episode: "The Brothers" |
| 1969 | The F.B.I. | Meredith Schaeffer | Episode: "Tug-of-War" |
| 1970 | It Takes a Thief | Sharon Foster | Episode: "Nice Girls Marry Stockbrokers" |
| 1971 | Alias Smith and Jones | Betsy Jamison | Episode: "A Fistful of Diamonds" |
| 1972 | Gunsmoke | Tara Hutson | Episode: "Tara" |
| 1972 | Love, American Style | Mildred (segment "Love and the Impressionist") | Episode: "Love and the First Kiss / Love and the Impressionist / Love and the Super Lover" |
| 1973 | The Norliss Tapes | Marsha Sterns | Television film |
| 1973 | Savage | Allison Baker | Television film |
| 1973 | The Six Million Dollar Man: Wine, Women and War | Cynthia Holland | Television film |
| 1973 | Adam's Rib | Diana | Episode: "For Richer, for Poorer" |
| 1974 | Dirty Sally | Dolly | Episode: "Right of Way" |
| 1977 | Delta County, U.S.A. | Jonsie Wilson | Television film |
| 1977 | Man from Atlantis | Belle | Episode: "C.W. Hyde" |
| 1977–1978 | Starsky & Hutch | Nikki; Catlin | Episode: "Starsky and Hutch Are Guilty"; Episode: "Class in Crime" |
| 1979 | The Legend of the Golden Gun | Maggie | Television film |
| 1979 | Undercover with the KKK | Mary Beth Barker | Television film |
| 1979 | A Man Called Sloane | The Voice of Effie (voice) | Episode: "The Seduction Squad"; Episode: "Tuned for Destruction"; Episode: "The Venus Microbe"; Episode: "Collision Course"; Episode: "Samurai"; Episode: "Sweethearts of Disaster"; Episode: "Lady Bug"; Episode: "Architect of Evil"; Episode: "The Shangri-La Syndrome" |
| 1980 | Death Ray 2000 | Effie (voice) | Television film |
| 1982 | The Fall Guy | Crystal | Episode: "No Way Out" |
| 1982 | Rooster | Policewoman | Television film |
