= Karen Sheperd =

American martial artist

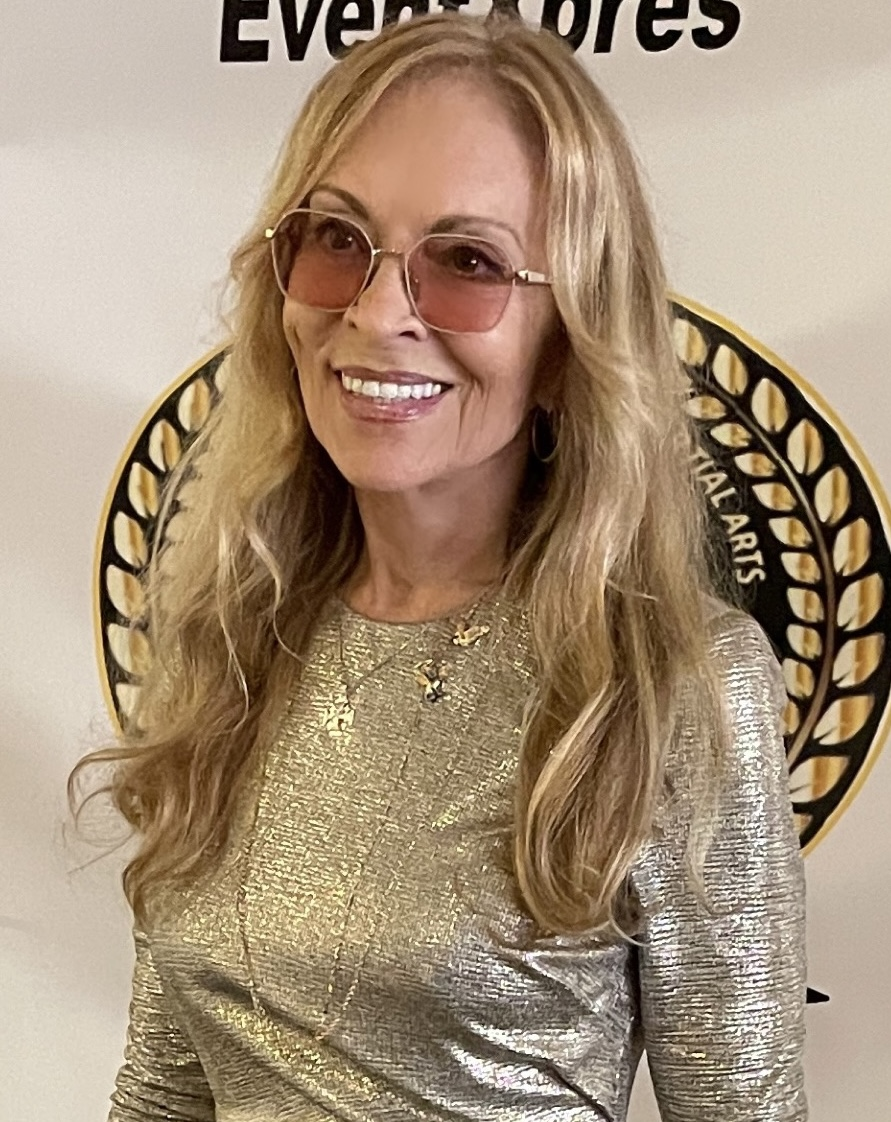
- Karen Sheperd receives "Long Beach International Martial Arts Hall of Fame" award, Long Beach CA, July 29, 2023.
- Occupations: actress, martial artist
- Years active: 1981–present

Karen Sheperd is an American actress and martial artist with an extensive career in film, theatre and television.

In 1979, Sheperd was the first woman to hold the title of #1 Women's Black Belt Forms Champion for the "Karate Illustrated" ratings, a title she retained again in 1980. Sheperd was also the first woman to be rated #1 Women's Black Belt Forms competitor in the "STAR System" ratings in 1980.

== Career ==
=== Acting ===
During her reign as the #1 Women's Black Belt forms champion, Sheperd received an offer from Tadashi Yamashita to star in The Shinobi Ninja. She retired from competition to accept this offer, becoming the first American female martial artist to become an action film star.

After filming Shinobi Ninja in Japan in 1981, Sheperd relocated to study acting in Los Angeles, California.

A few of the films she subsequently starred in are:

- Cyborg 2 with Angelina Jolie and Jack Palance
- Righting Wrongs (aka 'Above the Law') with Cynthia Rothrock
- America 3000.

Sheperd is known for her character as "The Enforcer" on television's Hercules: The Legendary Journeys. Her first episode, titled "The Enforcer", received the highest ratings for the entire series. Author Robert Weisbrot said "The fight scenes between Hercules and the Enforcer are among the series' best".

Sheperd has performed on stage (theatre) in such plays as Summer and Smoke by Tennessee Williams and In the Boom Boom Room by David Rabe.

=== Martial arts ===
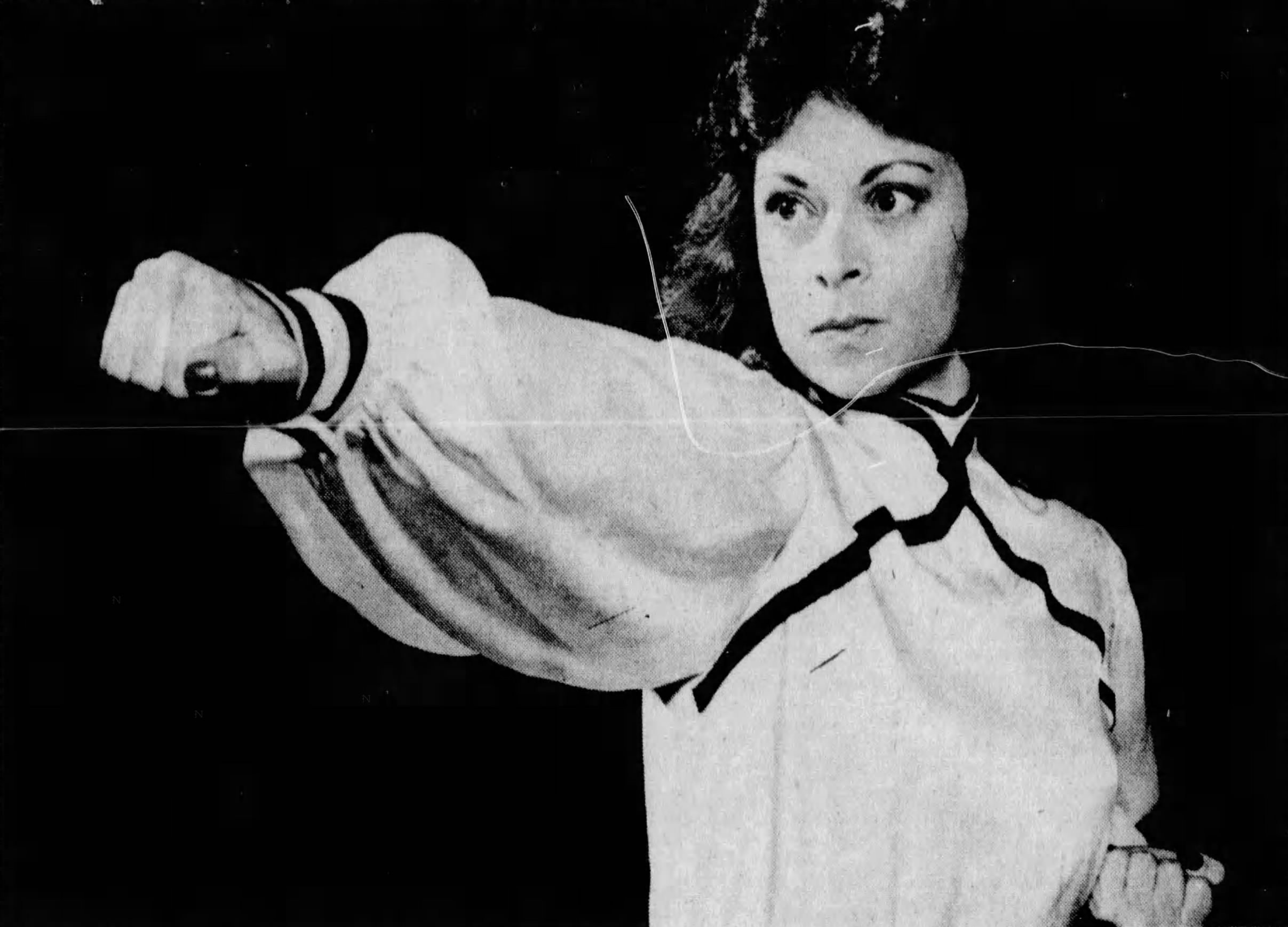
Sheperd in 1979

Sheperd first took up karate in 1973 while a student at the University of Oregon.

In 1974, Mike Anderson's Professional Karate magazine rated women and men in one category. Before "Professional Karate" (published by went out of business, one of Sheperd's teachers, Malia Dacascos-Bernal was rated in the top 10.

Sheperd also had the distinction of being the first #1 Women's Forms Champion in the STAR System World Kickboxing Ratings (Standardized Tournaments And Ratings) System which was established in 1980 by editor Paul Maslak for Kick Illustrated Magazine.

Sheperd was the first woman to ever win the Grand Championship title over all male and female forms competitors at the US Open Battle of the Superstars at the Bayfront Center in St. Petersburg, Florida on November 1, 1980. Her victory with her signature chain whip was featured on The World of People television show. Her win drew National attention, including a report on the National nightly news.

Karen Sheperd received her first film offer in 1981 and retired from competition after winning the women's Black Belt Kata division at the Diamond Nationals on May 2, 1981, in Minneapolis, Minnesota. Sheperd defeated the Nation's top women competitors with a score of 39.1 points over Belinda Davis (2nd Place, 38.9 points), Cynthia Rothrock (3rd Place, 38.8 points, and Lori Clapper (4th Place, 38.3 points.

Following Cynthia Rothrock's appearance on the cover of Karate Illustrated magazine (Aug 1981), Karen Sheperd was the second woman to grace the cover of ″Karate Illustrated″ Magazine (Feb 1982), the first of many magazine covers she would appear on.

In 1992 Sheperd was voted the "Most Popular Female Martial Arts Superstar" by readers of Inside Kung Fu Magazine. In 1997 Sheperd was inducted into the prestigious Black Belt Hall of Fame as "Woman of the Year". In 2002, she was inducted into the Martial Arts History Museum Hall of Fame.

She currently holds the rank of “Professor” 8th degree Black Belt (martial arts) in the art of Wun Hop Kuen Do, based on the Kajukenbo system founded by Al Dacascos. While Al Dacascos is her head instructor in Wun Hop Kuen Do, Sheperd was the protégé (for forms competition) of Malia Bernal, stepmother of Mark Dacascos.

== Filmography ==
=== Film ===
| Year | Title | Role | Notes |
|---|---|---|---|
| 1981 | The Shinobi Ninja | Elizabeth Smith | |
| 1982 | The Concrete Jungle | Kung Fu | |
| 1986 | America 3000 | Keva | |
| 1986 | Righting Wrongs (a.k.a. Above the Law) | Karen | |
| 1991 | Blood Chase | Cheryl Anderson | |
| 1992 | Mission of Justice | Officer Lynn Steele | |
| 1993 | Terminator Woman | Sergeant Julia A. Parish | |
| 1993 | Cyborg 2 | Chen | Video |
| 1994 | Operation Golden Phoenix | Princess Tara | |
| 1997 | Soul of the Avenger | Zani | |
| 1998 | Firestorm | Carmin | |
| 1998 | Boogie Boy | Marlene | |
| 1998 | Another Day in Paradise | Big Man's Wife | |
| 2003 | Midnight Expression | J.P. Harley | Short film |
| 2014 | M.A.R.R.A | Deidre | |

=== Television ===
| Year | Title | Role | Notes |
|---|---|---|---|
| 1996 | Hercules: The Legendary Journeys | The Enforcer | "The Enforcer", "Not Fade Away" |
| 1998 | Diagnosis: Murder | Liz Ambrose | "The Last Resort" |
| 1999 | V.I.P. | Leena | "Val Goes to Town" |
| 2000 | The Privateers | Captain Lana Tori | TV film |
| 2011 | Criminal Minds | Katherine Shepherd | "Epilogue" |
