= In the Shadow of Kilimanjaro =

- Directed by: Raju Patel
- Written by: T. Michael Harry; Jeffrey M. Sneller
- Produced by: Jeffrey M. Sneller
- Starring: John Rhys-Davies; Timothy Bottoms; Irene Miracle
- Cinematography: Chuy Elizondo
- Edited by: Pradip Roy Shah
- Music by: Arlon Ober
- Distributed by: Scotti Brothers Pictures
- Release dates: April 30, 1986 (UK); May 9, 1986 (USA)
- Running time: 97 minutes
- Countries: United Kingdom; Kenya
- Language: English

In the Shadow of Kilimanjaro is a 1986 British-Kenyan horror film set in Kenya. The film was directed by Raju Patel. It is loosely based on a true story.

== Plot ==
In 1984, in the small town of Namanga, Kenya, a young girl is found alone in the wilderness. Jack Ringtree, who found the girl, brings her to the local school to find out more about her. Namanga is going through a severe drought, which causes water to become scarce. Jack visits a nearby mining outpost to ask if they have water. the owner, Chris Tucker, tells him off. Jack's wife, Lee, arrives in Namanga that night, and has sex with Jack. Meanwhile, a local boy is kidnapped by a troop of chacma baboons.

The next morning, one of the miners, Claud Gagnon, is mauled by a troop of baboons while changing a flat tire. The grandfather of the missing child calls up Jack and Chris, asking if they can help him find his grandson. Chris leads the miners and a group of Maasai women to look for the missing child. They find both the bodies of the child and Claud. The group massacres a troop of baboons while Jack takes images as proof.

Jack and Chris plead with the local district officer, Tshombe, to evacuate everyone in Namanga to Nairobi, but Tshombe dismisses them. Jack then travels to Nairobi to find someone who can eradicate the baboons, but is also dismissed. Lucille, Claud's widow, grieves over his death and plans to leave Kenya. Meanwhile, two electricians tries to fix a broken telephone line. A troop of baboons attacks them and kills one of the man, while the other escapes.

The next day, Lee is attacked and almost killed by a troop of baboons, but is saved by Jack. The mining outpost is also attacked by a large troop of baboons, but everyone escaped. Chris gets a report of a supply truck that crashed 10 miles away from Namanga. Chris, Jack, and two miners, Odom and Uto, travels to the site. Uto explores the area and finds that almost everything has been stolen. The others find a troop of baboons with the supply. Chris scares them off and Jack explores the flipped supply truck. The troop of baboons returns, now more fierce, Chris, Odom, and Uto takes of on the jeep, leaving Jack behind. Meanwhile, Tshombe flies Lucille out of town, but a stowaway baboon on the plane attacks them, forcing the plane to crash, killing all three of them.

When Chris returns, he gets a report about a local school getting attacked. He sends Odom and Uto to take care of the situation. Jack bribes the troop of baboons and successfully escapes. He hot wires an abandoned bus and meets up with Chris. They all head to the school and successfully saves everyone.

The entire town is barricaded inside a local hotel, with the miners guarding the area. The teacher, Linda, is suddenly killed by a baboon that broke into the hotel. The miners protect the locals, while Chris and Jack fights off the horde of monkeys. Chris is knocked out when it suddenly rains. The rain scares away the baboons and causes the town's drought to finally be over.

== Cast ==
- John Rhys-Davies ... Chris Tucker
- Timothy Bottoms ... Jack Ringtree
- Irene Miracle ... Lee Ringtree
- Michele Carey ... Ginny Hansen
- Don Blakely ... Julius X. Odom
- Calvin Jung ... Mitushi Uto
- Patrick Gorman ... Eugene Kurtz
- Mark Watters ... Carlyle Bandy
- Jim Boeke ... Claud Gagnon
- Patty Foley ... Lucille Gagnon
- Carl Vundla ... District Officer James Tshombe
