= America 3000 =

1986 film directed by David Engelbach

- Theatrical release poster
- Directed by: David Engelbach
- Written by: David Engelbach
- Produced by: Yoram Globus; Menahem Golan
- Starring: Chuck Wagner; Laurene Landon; William Wallace; Sue Giosa; Victoria Barrett
- Cinematography: David Gurfinkel
- Edited by: Alain Jakubowicz
- Music by: Tony Berg
- Production company: Cannon Films
- Distributed by: Metro-Goldwyn-Mayer
- Release date: April 1986 (US)
- Running time: 94 minutes
- Country: United States
- Language: English
- Budget: $2 million

America 3000 is a 1986 post-apocalyptic science-fiction film from Cannon Films, written and directed by David Engelbach, and starring Chuck Wagner, Laurene Landon, and Karen Sheperd. The film premiered in the US in April 1986 and was released on a regional basis, opening on various dates.

The film is set in post-apocalyptic Colorado, nine hundred years after a nuclear war between the Soviet Union and The United States. The genders have separated into two warring factions; Plugots and Fraus. The Amazon-like females of the 'Frau' are the dominant tribe, and under them all male 'Plugots' are slaves, breeders, and playthings. Korvis (Chuck Wagner) and Gruss (William Wallace) escape enslavement, and, upon discovery of a stash of 21st-century weaponry, a new arms race is started between the tribes. It is up to Korvis, along with the Frau queen Vena (Laurene Landon) to find peace.

== Plot ==
Young Plugots, Korvis and Gruss, are taken as slaves to the 'Comb of the Friscos', a Frau base. Korvis starts a riot, and the pair manage to escape. The boys flee into 'the contamns', an old irradiated territory where the religious Frau cannot pursue them. In the contamns, Korvis and Gruss find a children's book, and a top-hat.

Korvis and Gruss band together with other escaped Plugots, and spend years forming a comb of their own in the contamns, out of the ruins of an old 'Murcan' army base named Camp Reagan. Korvis spends his free time reading and educating himself from the children's book, coming to the realization that they are all 'Men', rather than Plugots. Gruss goes on to elaborate that, while the refined males of their camp were now 'Men'; feral, less intellectual Plugots still did exist, driven by hunger and stupidity. On the way back to the Comb of the Friscos, Reya, the Queen of the Frau (known as a Tiara), is gravely wounded during an ambush by feral Plugots.

Upon arrival at the Comb of the Friscos, Reya is near death, and informs her daughters about a secret map in her shelter, instructing them to follow it. Reya passes on her title of Tiara to the eldest daughter, Vena, much to the dismay of the younger sister, Lakella. Upon hearing of Reya's death, Morha, the Tiara of Kansos, and her sister, Freyha, arrive at the gates of the Comb of Frisco. A funeral for Reya and a celebration for Vena's crowning are held at the camp. A prayer is held, blessing Vena's rule until the great 'Prezeedent' arrives to lead them all to salvation. Lakella is seen as the stronger sister by Morha, and was expected to be the new Tiara of Frisco. Morha and Freyha discuss the unrest during Vena's crowning, and look for an opportunity to annex the comb into their own fold. Vena finds the map, which shows a path through the entirety of 'the contamns'. Lynka, Vena's closest friend, warns her that, if her sister Lakella finds out about her intent to break the sacred rules, Vena will certainly be overthrown.

Korvis attacks the Comb of the Friscos and releases the remaining male slaves, but finds himself needing to distract the pursuing Frau. He leads Lakella and Vena into the contamns, where the women catch up to him. Lakella shoots Korvis, knocking him into a ravine. Korvis awakens, narrowly avoiding death, as Lakella's arrow was stopped by the children's reading book. Korvis searches for an exit, but instead comes across an old vault door. Inside the vault, Korvis discovers a stash of laser weapons, a boombox, a radiation suit, and a message for the President of The United States. Korvis uses his newfound technology to roleplay the mythical god-character of 'The Prezeedent', and seeks to kidnap a close friend of Vena to trade in exchange for diplomacy.

Gruss and Relk ambush a Frau seeder camp, and capture Lynka. Later that night, Korvis rains fire from the sky and terrorizes the Frau to get their attention, commanding that Vena meet 'the prezeedent' at sunrise in the contamns. Vena meets with 'the prezeedent' and, in exchange for Lynka's life, follows him to the presidential bunker. Inside, Korvis reveals his true identity to Vena, and shows her that, as she is 'woman', he is 'man'. Korvis invites her to feel his flesh, ultimately leading to the couple having intercourse. Meanwhile, back at the Frau base, Morha and Freyha conspire against Vena, and convince Lakella to usurp her sister's crown. In a display of power, Lakella launches an assault on the Plugot base.

During the assault on the men's camp, many lives are lost. Morha is knocked off her horse by a grenade and is trampled by the remaining soldiers, Amie is killed by an oncoming thunder-rock, and Lakella is killed in hand-to-hand combat with Gruss. Korvis, upon arriving home to the wreckage, angrily launches a counter-offensive, believing Vena is to blame. At the Frisco gates, Korvis meets a surrendering Vena, who was unaware of the ambush plans or her sister's treachery. Vena and Korvis throw down their weapons, and kiss. The onlooking men and women follow suit, signaling an end to the war between them.

== Cast ==
- Chuck Wagner as Korvis
- Laurene Landon as Vena
- William Wallace as Gruss
- Sue Giosa as Morha
- Victoria Barrett as Lakella
- Galyn Görg as Lynka
- Shaike Ophir as Lelz (credited as Shai K. Ophir)
- Camilla Sparv as Reya
- Karen Sheperd as Keva (credited as Karen Lee Sheperd)
- Ari Sorko-Ram as Relk
- Ezra Dagan as Amie
- Joanna Reis as Freyha
- Steve Malovic as Aargh the Awful
- Anat Zahor as Bowa (credited as Anat Zachor)
- Pierre as Henry Troke

== Reception ==
TV Guide found the film's "pace is creakingly slow, and the performances are all of the somnambulistic variety. The only saving graces are a relatively exciting climax and a funny monster named Aargh the Awful".

The Globe and Mail summarized the film as, "Space, midnight Mad Maxine meets Here Come the Bridesmaids (if bridesmaids had more cleavage). It's the year 3000, nine centuries after a cataclysmic nuclear war, and babes have taken over the world – not women, but babes, who dress and do their hair as if chauvinist pigs were still in charge. Wanting to be accepted for who they are, dammit, the valiant, long-oppressed menfolk decide to fight back, led by the burly Korvis (Chuck Wagner, who the following year would become Randall Thompson on General Hospital). But winning over those big-breasted warlords won't be easy; nor will Korvis's noble desire to make love, not war."

Sunday Mercury referred to the film as, "a big-haired, post-apocalyptic feminist film that is, by all accounts, one of the best worst films that's ever been made."

In the 2015 documentary, Electric Boogaloo: The Wild, Untold Story of Cannon Films, lead actress Laurene Landon, recounts her experience with Cannon Films when filming America 3000, and sets fire to her only copy of the VHS film.
