= Damned River =

- Theatrical release poster
- Directed by: Michael Schroeder
- Written by: John M. Crowther; Bayard Johnson
- Produced by: Lance Hool
- Starring: Stephen Shellen; Lisa Aliff; John Terlesky; Marc Poppel; Bradford Bancroft; Louis van Niekerk
- Cinematography: George Tirl
- Edited by: Mark Conte
- Music by: James Stemple
- Production company: Silver Lion Films
- Distributed by: United Artists
- Release date: October 13, 1989
- Running time: 95 minutes
- Country: United States
- Language: English

Damned River is a 1989 American action film directed by Michael Schroeder and co-written by John Crowther and Bayard Johnson. The film stars Stephen Shellen, Lisa Aliff, John Terlesky, Marc Poppel, Bradford Bancroft and Louis van Niekerk. The film was released on October 13, 1989, by United Artists.

== Cast ==
- Stephen Shellen as Ray
- Lisa Aliff as Anne
- John Terlesky as Carl
- Marc Poppel as Luke
- Bradford Bancroft as Jerry
- Louis van Niekerk as Von Hoenigen
- Leslie Mongezi as Mavuso
- Moses Ncube as Young Boy
- Mtcheso Ncube as Witchdoctor
- Todd Brownell as Von Hoenigen's Man
- Joe Siabe as Von Hoenigen's Man
- Tetrex Tshuma as Von Hoenigen's Man
- Boniface Chivuvenga as Von Hoenigen's Man
