= Showdown in Little Tokyo =

1991 US action film directed by Mark L. Lester

- Theatrical release poster
- Directed by: Mark L. Lester
- Written by: Stephen Glantz; Caliope Brattlestreet
- Produced by: Martin E. Caan; Mark L. Lester
- Starring: Dolph Lundgren; Brandon Lee
- Cinematography: Mark Irwin
- Edited by: Robert A. Ferretti; Steven Kemper
- Music by: David Michael Frank
- Distributed by: Warner Bros.
- Release date: August 23, 1991
- Running time: 79 minutes
- Country: United States
- Languages: English; Japanese
- Budget: $8 million
- Box office: $2.3 million

Showdown in Little Tokyo is a 1991 American buddy cop action film directed by Mark L. Lester, and starring Dolph Lundgren and Brandon Lee in his first American film role. It follows a police officer and a martial artist attempting to save a woman from a drug dealer. The film was released in the United States on August 23, 1991, and was a critical and box-office bomb. It has gained a cult following among action fans, especially for the chemistry between Lundgren and Lee and David Michael Frank's score.

== Plot ==
Los Angeles cop Chris Kenner (Dolph Lundgren) is an American who was raised in Japan. He is given a new partner, Johnny Murata (Brandon Lee), an American of partial Japanese descent. Kenner does not appreciate American culture, while Johnny does not like Japanese culture much. One thing they both enjoy are the martial arts, in which they are both experts. The two are assigned to L.A.'s Little Tokyo, where they break up some criminal activity in a Japanese restaurant, and an arrest is made. While Kenner and Johnny are questioning the suspect, Kenner notices that he has tattoos of the Iron Claw yakuza clan. This reminds him of when he was 9 years old and he witnessed his parents being killed by a member of the yakuza. Before Kenner or Murata can interrogate the suspect further, he kills himself in the interrogation room by breaking his own neck.

The leader of the Iron Claw clan, Funekei Yoshida (Cary-Hiroyuki Tagawa), kills the owner of a popular downtown nightclub, the Bonsai Club, by crushing the owner, Tanaka (Philip Tan), in a car compactor. To celebrate gaining ownership of the Bonsai Club, Yoshida throws a party at his house with all of the club staff. Yoshida discovers that one of the girls at the party, Angel Mueller (Renee Griffin), had warned Tanaka about Yoshida behind his back. Yoshida summons Angel to his office to question her about her loyalty, where she attempts to appease him by offering her body to him, but Yoshida instead drugs Angel and strips off her clothes before beheading her.

When the coroner runs an analysis on Angel's body, it is revealed that the methamphetamines in her system would have led to her death anyway. This discovery of drugs, together with the suspect having yakuza tattoos, prompts Kenner and Johnny to go to the Bonsai Club in search of information. There they meet Angel's close friend, lounge singer Minako Okeya (Tia Carrere). Whilst talking with Minako, Kenner and Johnny are ambushed and taken to see the nightclub's owner and Kenner recognizes Yoshida as the man who killed his parents. Yoshida is now a drug manufacturer using a local brewery as his distribution center. He uses smaller gangs such as the Hells Angels, Crips and Sureños to peddle the drugs for him, in return for a percentage of the profit. Enraged, Kenner pulls his gun on Yoshida and almost kills him to avenge the death of his parents, but Johnny manages to defuse the situation and they both leave the nightclub.

Later that night, Yoshida rapes and kidnaps Minako and holds her hostage in his home and vows to kill Kenner. Kenner and Johnny set out for Yoshida's heavily guarded home, where they rescue Minako. His pride wounded, Yoshida sends his men out to get Minako back. He has Kenner and Johnny captured, stripped topless and tortured by electrocution, however, the two manage to escape. They prepare for an assault on Yoshida's brewery, where they rescue Minako once again. They chase Yoshida down to a parade being held in the middle of the city, where he and Kenner engage in a modern-day samurai-like sword duel. The fight ends with Kenner overpowering Yoshida and impaling him through the abdomen before throwing him into a giant spinning Catherine wheel firework display, which burns Yoshida alive before exploding and killing him. Kenner and Johnny are then hailed as heroes by the crowd as they escort Minako away.

== Cast ==
- Dolph Lundgren as Sergeant Chris Kenner
- Brandon Lee as Detective Johnny Murata
- Cary-Hiroyuki Tagawa as Funekei Yoshida (Japanese: 吉田船渓, Yoshida Funekei)
- Tia Carrere as Minako Okeya (Japanese: 桶屋美奈子, Okeya Minako)
- Toshishirô Obata as Sato (Japanese: 佐藤, Satō)
- Philip Tan as Tanaka (Japanese: 田中, Tanaka)
- Rodney Kageyama as Eddie
- Ernie Lively as Detective Nelson
- Renee Griffin as Angel Mueller
- Reid Asato as Muto (Japanese: 武藤, Mutō)
- Takayo Fischer as Mama Yamaguchi
- Simon Rhee as Ito (Japanese: 伊藤, Itō)
- Vernee Watson-Johnson as Coroner Nonnie Russell
- Lenny Imamura as Kickboxer #1
- Roger Yuan as Kickboxer #2
- Gerald Okamura as Hegata
- Steve Park as Asian Cop #1
- Jim Ishida as Asian Cop #2
- George Cheung as Henchman
- Nathan Jung as Bonsai Club Manager
- Al Leong as Henchman
- James Lew as Henchman
- Branscombe Richmond as Man In Door
- Jimmy Taenaka as Hardboy

== Production ==
Lester says the film was taken over by the studio and recut without his involvement.

There is both an R-Rated and Unrated version of the film, with the latter having approximatlely 19 seconds of extra footage.

== Reception ==
=== Box office ===
Warner Bros. was not happy with the film and re-edited it, only to give it a limited theatrical run in the United States, Mexico, Australia, France (where it skipped Paris), Italy, Israel, and Hungary. Except for these markets, the film was released direct-to-video in 1992.

In the US opening weekend, the film grossed $455,192 from 140 theaters which was an average of $3,251 per theater. This accounted for 20% of the film's total gross.

It ranked #9 in Hungary's Top 10 of 1992 Overall Box Office Grosses (according to the 1994 Variety International Film Guide), grossing $197,590 in Hungary.

After Brandon Lee died while filming The Crow (1994), movies with Lee in leading roles, such as Showdown in Little Tokyo, saw a surge in video sales.

The film became a cult classic among action fans after its release. Director Mark L. Lester said: “I was going for exaggerated reality. Kind of a pop art thing or a comic book. But Warner took about ten minutes out of the film, which were pretty good actually. They changed it all around. They didn’t do a big release, but I guess people liked it.“ Brandon Lee was also very fond of the movie: "I didn't have a lot of input into it. It was really just a job for me but it was a good experience".

=== Critical response ===
The film faced largely negative reviews from critics. Vincent Canby of The New York Times described it as "violent, but spiritless." It holds a rating of 33% on Rotten Tomatoes based on 9 reviews, with an average score of 4.3/10.

Upon its 2015 DVD release, DVD Talk reviewer Ian Jane wrote that it was a shallow but highly enjoyable action film of its time. He found it fast-paced, action packed, and funny. He felt it had good photography, nice locations, and that Brandon Lee shined in his role.

Contemporary critic Chris Coffel of Bloody Disgusting praised it for being a well-made action film of its time, and that both leads delivered their roles well. He also praised the lead villain Cary-Hiroyuki Tagawa. Finally he felt the movie fell flat on the humorous side of things, but was great fun for its genre.

On JoBlo.com, writer Chris Bumbray considers it to be an underrated gem and a cult classic. He thinks that Lee steals the show from Lundgren and that the film showcases the range of the early departed actor. His final thought was that it was a fun B actioner.

Movie review website Last Movie Outpost stated that "Showdown in Little Tokyo is the kind of movie that feels like it was assembled from spare parts of better films and then supercharged with testosterone. It’s violent, goofy, casually insensitive, and completely unbothered by how any of this might age."

Movie critic Brandon Ledet of website Swamp Flix stated that "Having defined the pinnacle of the genre with Commando, director Mark Lester has an eye for the shameless beefcake ultraviolence and an ear for the groany, juvenile one-liners that make for a memorable action classic."

Movie review Website Trashy Trove stated that "Showdown in Little Tokyo really proves the age-old action movie thinking that you don’t need a deep and convincing story if you have enough intense action."
