= Casey Deidrick =

American actor

- Born: April 25, 1987 (age 39); Santa Clara, California
- Education: Metropolitan State College (dropped out)
- Occupations: Actor, singer
- Years active: 2009-present
- Known for: Days of Our Lives; Eye Candy; In The Dark
- Height: 6'5

Casey Jon Deidrick (/ˈdiːdrɪk/ DEE-drik; born April 25, 1987) is an American actor and singer. He is best known for originating the role of Chad DiMera on the NBC soap opera Days of Our Lives.

== Personal life ==
Deidrick was born in Santa Clara, California to parents Barry Jon Deidrick, an IBEW 332 Union electrician, and Denise Deck, a nurse. His parents divorced when he was three. Initially he lived with his mother, but when he was seven, she moved to Arizona and he passed into the care of his father in Hollister, California. After his first year in high school, he rejoined his mother, then living in Highlands Ranch, Colorado.

Deidrick began skateboarding while in Hollister. He persevered with it after his relocation to Colorado, and was eventually sponsored. In 2004, he competed in the Vans World Amateur Competition. He was also featured in a photo-spread for Transworld Skateboarding. He was injured many times during his skateboarding career without serious consequences, but when one especially traumatic accident left him with a severe concussion, he decided to give up skateboarding to focus on acting instead.

Deidrick has four younger half-siblings: Amy and Jake from his father and stepmother, and two half-sisters, Micayla and Nikole from his mother and stepfather. Deidrick attended Metropolitan State College in Denver for a year where he majored in theater and psychology. In 2012, Deidrick adopted a Siberian Husky dog which he named Nanuk. Deidrick was also the Unclean Vocalist in the heavy metal band called And Still I Rise.

In February 2025, he was arrested in Tennessee and charged with misdemeanor domestic assault and interference with a 911 call. People reported that on the morning following his booking, Deidrick was released after posting a $2,500 bond.

== Career ==
Deidrick had his first experience as an actor in high school when he and a friend auditioned for the school's production of Carousel with a rock song. Deidrick attended the AMTC (Actors, Models & Talent Competition) Convention in Orlando, Florida, where he met his agent. Deidrick made the decision to go into acting at the age of 15 when he saw The Lord of the Rings for the first time. At the age of 19, Deidrick relocated to Los Angeles to pursue his acting career. He found a manager and enrolled in acting classes. Deidrick supported himself working as a waiter and eventually booked guest spots on Wizards of Waverly Place and 90210 before booking Days. In February 2012, Deidrick made a guest appearance on the ABC prime time series Body of Proof. In April 2013, Deidrick made guest appearances on Glee and NBC's Revolution. On June 20, 2013, Deidrick announced his departure from Days of our Lives on his Twitter account. Deidrick's last appearance on Days was on October 30, 2013.

In September 2014, Deidrick was cast in MTV's thriller series Eye Candy. He played the main role of Tommy, a detective, who worked with Lindy (Victoria Justice). The series is about a genius who realizes that her online suitor is a dangerous cyber stalker. The show was cancelled after one season. In November 2016, Casey appeared in The Chainsmokers' music video for the song "All We Know."

On July 7, 2017, Deidrick had been cast on the MTV teen drama series Teen Wolf where he portrayed Halwyn, a former resident of Eichen House who also happens to be a hundred-year-old Hellhound with mysterious ties to an ancient evil now threatening Beacon Hills in the aftermath of the Ghost Riders and the Wild Hunt.

From 2018-2019, Deidrick starred in the mini-series Driven in the role of Colton Donovan, a bad boy race car driver, who falls in love with Rylee Thomas, a generous girl involved in foster care. After the first year, his role was recast as he mentioned scheduling conflicts with his other series In The Dark. His passionate interpretation of the role is a favorite in the hearts of his Passionflix fans.

From 2019-2022, Deidrick starred in In The Dark. He played Max Parish, a food truck owner and associate of Darnell who becomes attracted to Murphy.

In 2020, Deidrick starred in the feature psychological thriller film Painter.

In February 2021, Deidrick starred in a feature-length episode of the horror TV anthology Into the Dark titled "Tentacles" as Sam Anselm. In December of the same year, he was cast alongside Emily Osment in Hallmark’s A Very Merry Bridesmaid.

== Filmography ==
=== Film ===
Year	Title	Role	Notes
2009	Settle	Jimmy	Short film; as Casey Jon Deidrick
2012	I Am Not a Hipster	Steve	Uncredited
2013	Running Up That Hill	Ryan	Short film; as Casey Jon Deidrick
2017	American Satan	Frat Jock 2	
2018	Dog Days	Jude	
2020	Painter	Ryan West	Indie feature film

=== Television ===
Year	Title	Role	Notes
2009	90210	Julian	Episode: "Of Heartbreaks and Hotels"
2009	Wizards of Waverly Place	Sal	Episode: "Don't Rain on Justin's Parade-Earth"
2009–2013	Days of Our Lives	Chad DiMera	Series regular
2012	Body of Proof	Aaron Lux	Episode: "Home Invasion"
2013	Glee	Chip	Episode: "Sweet Dreams"
2013	Revolution	Teen Miles Matheson	Episode: "Home"
2015	Eye Candy	Tommy	Main role; 10 episodes
2016	Advance & Retreat	Cody Randall	Television film
2017	A Midsummer's Nightmare	Liam	Television film
2017	Teen Wolf	Halwyn	Recurring role; 3 episodes
2018	Driven	Colton Donavan	Main role; 6 episodes
2019	Now Apocalypse	Jacques	Episode: "Anywhere Out of the World"
2019–2022	In The Dark	Max Parish	Main role
2021	Into the Dark	Sam Anselm	Episode: "Tentacles"
2021	A Very Merry Bridesmaid	Drew Vaughn	Television Film (Hallmark)
2023	Wedding Season	Ryan Peterson	Television film (Hallmark)
2026	FBI	Devon Reinhardt	Recurring role: 3 episodes "Defector", "Omissions" and "White Rock"

=== Music videos ===
Year	Title	Artist	Role	Ref.
2013	"Sixty Five Roses"	And Still I Rise	Himself	
2014	"Wonder"	Adventure Club feat. The Kite String Tangle	Older Brother	
2016	"Beggars"	Krewella feat. Diskord	Himself	
2016	"All We Know"	The Chainsmokers feat. Phoebe Ryan	Liam	
2019	"Homesick"	Dominique	Himself	
2019	"Tears"	Tenille Arts	Himself	
2020	"Think About You (Acoustic Version)"	JoJo	Himself	
2022	"Carbon Monoxide"	Krooked Kings	Himself	
2024	"Miner Imperfections (Family Ties Trilogy: Part 1)"	Charles Wesley Godwin	Himself	
