= Cyborg 2 =

1993 American science fiction action film

- Promotional release poster
- Directed by: Michael Schroeder
- Written by: Michael Schroeder; Mark Geldman; Ron Yanover
- Produced by: Raju Patel; Alain Silver
- Starring: Elias Koteas; Angelina Jolie; Jack Palance; Billy Drago; Karen Sheperd; Allen Garfield; Renee Griffin
- Music by: Peter Allen
- Production companies: Trimark Pictures; Anglo American Films; Freedom Filmworks International
- Distributed by: Vidmark Entertainment
- Release date: November 24, 1993
- Running time: 99 minutes
- Country: United States
- Language: English

Cyborg 2 (released in some countries as Glass Shadow) is a 1993 American science fiction action film directed by Michael Schroeder. It was produced by Alain Silver and Raju Patel. Schroeder, Mark Geldman, and Ron Yanover wrote the screenplay. The film is a direct sequel to 1989's Cyborg, starring Jean Claude Van Damme, and the second installment in the Cyborg film series.

The film stars Angelina Jolie in the main role, alongside Elias Koteas, Jack Palance, Billy Drago, Karen Sheperd, Allen Garfield and Renee Griffin in supporting roles.

The film takes place in 2074, years after the original film, and follows Cash Reese, a new cyborg developed for corporate espionage and assassination. She rebels against her creators after revealing they plan to destroy her by using her as a suicide bomber to take over a rival company. On the way, she falls in love with her combat trainer and encounters a renegade cyborg.

Cyborg 2 was released by Vidmark Entertainment direct-to-video on November 24, 1993.

A sequel titled Cyborg 3: The Recycler was released in 1994.

== Plot ==
In 2074, the cybernetics market is dominated by two rival companies: USA's Pinwheel Robotics and Japan's Kobayashi Electronics. Androids known as 'cyborgs' are commonplace, used for anything from soldiers to prostitutes. Casella "Cash" Reese is a Pinwheel prototype cyborg developed for corporate espionage and assassination. She is filled with a liquid explosive called "Glass Shadow". Pinwheel's CEO, Martin Dunn, plans to eliminate the entire Kobayashi board of directors using Cash as a suicide bomber to precipitate a hostile takeover of the company and obtain a monopoly over the cyborg market.

Cash is programmed to mimic human senses and emotions such as fear, love, pain, and hate. Guided by Mercy, a renegade prototype cyborg who can communicate through any electronic device, Cash and her combat trainer Colton "Colt" Ricks escape the Pinwheel facility so Cash can avoid self-destruction, something that most corporate espionage cyborgs face. They are relentlessly pursued by Pinwheel's hired killer or "wiretapper", Daniel Bench.

Bench must also deal with a rival bounty hunter named Chen (another cyborg), who plans on killing Ricks and reprogramming Cash to have her blow up Pinwheel instead as a means to punish the company's director, Dunn, as reprisal for an earlier act from Dunn that displeased her. However, Chen and Ricks get into a fight, which results in Chen getting electrocuted by a fuse box.

Mercy is later revealed to be a human/android hybrid who was created by Pinwheel in an attempt to create the next stage in human evolution. Mercy escaped before they had a chance to erase his memories. Ricks and Bench fall into a boxing match to find out who lives and who dies, namely going to the African coast, which results in Bench getting mutilated by a rotating fan, resulting in his death. Cash and Ricks escape to a new life in Africa after winning the tournament, while Mercy confronts Dunn, blaming him for ruining his life.

Dunn explains to Mercy his motives to be his work only for mankind's benefit. Unmoved, Mercy then activates his own Glass Shadow bomb, killing both Mercy and Dunn as well as destroying Pinwheel headquarters. After the skirmish and Pinwheel's downfall, Cash has remained young and beautiful while Ricks continues to age. When Cash realizes that Ricks has finally died of old age, she decides to shut herself down, remaining in a dream state forever.

== Cast ==
- Elias Koteas as Colton "Colt 45" Ricks, Cash's combat trainer and love interest.
- Angelina Jolie as Casella "Cash" Reese, a gynoid created by Pinwheel for corporate espionage and assassination.
- Jack Palance as Mercy, an old renegade cyborg who aids Cash moving against Pinwheel.
- Billy Drago as Danny Bench, an assassin who works for Pinwheel.
- Karen Sheperd as Chen, a bounty hunter rival to Bench.
- Allen Garfield as Martin Dunn, former CEO of Pinwheel, a powerful technology company which created Cash, and seeks to take over the company by using Cash as a suicide bomber.
- Renee Griffin as Dreena
- Ric Young as Bobby Lin, who runs the fight promotion and gambling of 'The Blade' - underground and highly illegal snuff combat that takes place under the propeller blades of a ship in a dry dock.
- Tracey Walter as "Wild Card"

Additionally, both Jean-Claude Van Damme and Vincent Klyn appear in flashback scenes as their roles Gibson Rickenbacker and Fender Tremolo from the original 1989 film, respectively.

== Reception ==
Alan Jones of the Radio Times rated the film three out of five stars and called it a "Blade Runner-inspired violent fantasy".

In 2014, Entertainment Weekly selected Cyborg 2 as Jolie's worst film.

Angelina Jolie has said that after she saw the film, she "went home and got sick".

== Sequel ==
Cyborg 3: The Recycler was produced and released in 1995, once again directed by Michael Schroeder.
