= Jim Boeke =

American football player (1938–2014)

No. 78, 68, 77
- Position: Offensive tackle

Personal information
- Born: September 11, 1938; Akron, Ohio, U.S.
- Died: September 26, 2014 (aged 76); Fountain Valley, California, U.S.
- Listed height: 6 ft 5 in (1.96 m)
- Listed weight: 255 lb (116 kg)

Career information
- High school: Cuyahoga Falls (OH)
- College: Heidelberg
- NFL draft: 1960: 19th round, 217th overall pick
- AFL draft: 1960

Career history
- Los Angeles Rams (1960–1963); Dallas Cowboys (1964–1967); New Orleans Saints (1968); Detroit Lions (1969)*; Washington Redskins (1969)*
- * Offseason or practice squad member only

Awards and highlights
- All-OAC (1959); Little All-American (1959)

Career NFL statistics
- Games played: 119
- Games started: 62
- Fumble recoveries: 2
- Stats at Pro Football Reference

James Frederick Boeke (September 11, 1938 – September 26, 2014) was an American professional football offensive tackle in the National Football League (NFL) for the Los Angeles Rams, Dallas Cowboys and New Orleans Saints. He played college football at Heidelberg College.

== Early life ==
Boeke was born in Akron, Ohio. He attended Cuyahoga Falls High School where he practiced football and track. He accepted a football scholarship from Heidelberg College, establishing himself as a two-way tackle in football and also lettering in track.

In 1985, he was inducted as a charter member of the Heidelberg University Athletic Hall of Fame. In 2008, he was inducted into the Summit County Sports Hall of Fame.

== Professional career ==
=== Los Angeles Rams ===
Boeke was selected by the Los Angeles Rams in the nineteenth round (217th overall) of the 1960 NFL draft. He was a backup offensive tackle. In 1963, he also played defensive tackle.

On August 19, 1964, he was traded to the Dallas Cowboys in exchange for rookie running back Les Josephson.

=== Dallas Cowboys ===
In 1964, he was acquired because the team needed offensive line depth after a rash of injuries. He started 7 games, including 4 at left tackle, replacing Tony Liscio who was placed on the injured reserve list.

The next year, he became the regular starter at left tackle after Liscio couldn't return from his right knee injury. In 1966, he started 10 games before missing time with a knee injury and being eventually replaced by Liscio.

His most famous play occurred near the end of the 1966 NFL Championship Game, with the team trailing the Green Bay Packers by a touchdown, the Cowboys had a first down on the Packers' 2-yard line, when Boeke was flagged for a false start, Dallas failed to score after Don Meredith threw an interception on fourth down. The Packers went on to beat the Kansas City Chiefs in the inaugural AFL-NFL championship game, now called the first Super Bowl.

From 1960 until 1966, he registered a streak of 92 consecutive games played. In 1967, he could not regain his starting position and was the backup to Liscio. His last game with the Cowboys was the 1967 NFL Championship Game known as the "Ice Bowl". On August 28, 1968, he was traded to the New Orleans Saints in exchange for linebacker Jackie Burkett.

=== New Orleans Saints ===
Boeke played in 13 games with the New Orleans Saints during the 1968 season. On July 28, 1969, he was traded to the Detroit Lions in exchange for a draft choice.

=== Detroit Lions ===
The Detroit Lions acquired Boeke to compete for the right tackle position that was vacated by the retirement of Charlie Bradshaw. On July 28, 1969, he was traded to the Washington Redskins in exchange for a draft pick.

=== Washington Redskins ===
On September 5, 1969, he was signed by the Washington Redskins. He was released on September 16.

== Personal life ==
In the off-season, he worked as a physical education teacher, and an English teacher at Audubon Middle School in the Crenshaw district of Los Angeles. During his playing days in Los Angeles, Boeke worked as a bodyguard for the Nelson family (of Ozzie and Harriet fame), and went on to work for Ricky Nelson.

== Death ==
Following his playing days, Boeke utilized his Hollywood connections and appeared in bit parts in TV (Newhart, MASH, Coach and many others) and movies (North Dallas Forty, Forrest Gump et al.) for many years. Boeke continued to live in the Southern California area as a teacher and high school football coach at Westminster High School. On September 26, 2014, he died from acute leukemia.

== Filmography ==
Year 89-97	Title coach	Role Mr Dubinski	Notes
1978	Heaven Can Wait	Kowalsky	
1979	North Dallas Forty	Stallings	
1980	Alligator	Shamsky	
1981	Under the Rainbow	Hangman	
1981	Escape from DS-3		
1982	Pandemonium	Fletcher	
1984	Fear City	Architect	
1986	In the Shadow of Kilimanjaro	Gagnon	
1987	The Kindred	Jackson	
1987	Dragnet	Nectar Pagan	
1989	Kill Me Again	Javonovitch	
1990	Backstreet Dreams	Burt	
1991	Star Trek VI: The Undiscovered Country	First Klingon general	
1994	Forrest Gump	University of Alabama Assistant Football Coach	Uncredited
2003	A Man Apart	Bad Cop	(final film role)
