= Raju Patel =

American film producer (1960–2005)

- Born: 1960; Nairobi, Kenya
- Died: October 9, 2005 (aged 44–45); Long Beach, California, U.S.
- Occupation: Film producer
- Spouse: Dimple Kumar
- Children: 3
- Relatives: Rajendra Kumar (father-in-law); Kumar Gaurav (brother-in-law)

Raju Patel (1960–October 9, 2005) was a Hollywood film producer and director. He has produced films like Bachelor Party and The Jungle Book.

== Early life ==
Patel was born in Kenya. His father Sharad Patel was in the film business and had produced and directed the film Rise and Fall of Idi Amin. Patel moved to London to study film making and graduated from the London Film School. Patel then moved to California at the age of 21.

== Career ==
In 1984, he teamed up with his father and at the age 23 he produced the Tom Hanks-starrer Bachelor Party. It was one of Hanks' first films in a comedic role. The film went on to be a financial success: made on a budget of US$6 million, it grossed over US$40 million at the box-office. In 1985 Patel decided to try his hand at direction and directed the film In the Shadow of Kilimanjaro. In 1994 he teamed up with Walt Disney Studios to produce Rudyard Kipling's The Jungle Book. In 1996 he produced The Adventures of Pinocchio. In 1997 he teamed up with Mark Damon to produce The Second Jungle Book: Mowgli & Baloo. In 1999 he produced The New Adventures of Pinocchio. In 2003 he was an executive producer on the film 11:14. Patel co-produced the Bollywood film Kaante which stars Amitabh Bachchan, Sanjay Dutt and was directed by Sanjay Gupta. Patel also worked with pop singer Michael Jackson and Mark Damon to set up the film company Neverland Pictures. In 1996 Patel was honoured with membership to the Academy of Motion Picture Arts & Sciences.

== Personal life ==
Patel was married to Dimple Kumar, the daughter of actor Rajendra Kumar, and the couple had two children.

== Death ==
Patel died on October 9, 2005, at Long Beach Memorial Medical Center in Long Beach after a two-year battle with colon cancer.

== Filmography ==
He was producer for all films unless otherwise noted.

=== Film ===
Year	Film	Credit	Notes	Other notes
1984	Bachelor Party			
1993	Cyborg 2			
1994	The Jungle Book			
1996	The Adventures of Pinocchio			
1997	The Second Jungle Book: Mowgli & Baloo			
1999	The New Adventures of Pinocchio		Direct-to-video	
2002	Kaante			
2003	11:14	Executive producer		Final film as a producer
2008	Bachelor Party 2: The Last Temptation		Direct-to-video	Posthumous release

As director

Year	Film
1985	In the Shadow of Kilimanjaro

Thanks

Year	Film	Role
1989	Jurrat	Thanks: For co-operation during the shooting in Los Angeles
2005	Wah-Wah	With special thanks to
2006	Zinda	In loving memory of
