= Painter (2020 film) =

Film

Painter is a 2020 indie psychological thriller film about a rich art collector (Betsy Randle) and benefactor who becomes obsessed with an unknown artist.

== Plot ==
A close relationship forms super fast between a young painter Aldis (Eric Ladin) and his new friend Joanne, a wealthy art collector. Joanne takes Aldis into her home and the young artist unfortunately finds out that their relationship is based on obsession with a taste of delusion and jealousy.

The story has some similarities when it comes down to the subject matter relating to the contemporary art world, but the director takes on a different perspective compared to its psychological counterparts Velvet Buzzsaw and Nocturnal Animals.

== Cast ==
Actor	Role
Betsy Randle	Joanne Marco
Eric Ladin	Aldis
Casey Deidrick	Ryan West
Cinthya Carmona	Lupe
Gregory Zarian	Glen Gale
Susan Anton	Carree Tole
Endre Hules	Anatole
Ethan Jones	Young Aldis
Omri Rose	Yuval
Patrick Gorman	The Gardener aka Bill
Marnee Carpenter	Art Student
Anastasia Leddick	Stocking Face
Ilka Urbach	Celebrity Interviewer
Sheila M. Lockhart	Art Gallery Patron
Tyrone Evans Clark	Young Artist Party Goer

== Production ==
- Written and directed by Cory Wexler Grant.
- Produced by Alexander Wenger and co-produced by Daisy Lora and Loring Weisenberger
- Executive producer was Jordan Wexler a.k.a. Jordan Wexler Grant
- Music by Dylan Glatthorn
- Cinematography by Pierluigi Malavasi

== Release ==
The film was released on October 13, 2020, on VOD / Digital release.

== Distribution ==
Distributed by 1844 Entertainment.
