= Patrick Gorman (American actor) =

American actor (born 1934)

- Born: Patrick O. Gorman; August 3, 1934 (age 91); Visalia, California, U. S.
- Occupation: Actor
- Years active: 1972–present

Patrick O. Gorman (born August 3, 1934) is an American theatre, film and television actor.

== Early life ==
Born in Visalia, California, Gorman spent eight years in the military and studied acting in Paris, France. While in Paris, he had a stint in the Cirque Medrano as a clown.

== Career ==
He has a background in musical comedy performing in Judy Garland's act around the country and at the Palace Theatre (Broadway) in New York City. He also danced in the nightclub acts of Donald O'Connor, Sammy Davis Jr. and Jimmy Durante.

Any the funny thing is, I don’t really look like him at all, but I had something. And incredible luck. The fact that I have a lot of Civil War fans validates that I guess, because apparently I was very successful in getting Hood’s persona across.

— Gorman on his role as John Bell Hood in the film Gettysburg

Appearances in film include the 1975 film Three Days of the Condor, 1986's In the Shadow of Kilimanjaro, 1993's war epic Gettysburg, 1995's Wild Bill, 1997's Rough Riders and his reprisal of the role of Confederate General John Bell Hood in the 2003 film Gods and Generals. In the 2019 film Avengers: Endgame, he was Chris Evans' body double in the role of an elderly Steve Rogers; Evans's face in prosthetics was later edited on. Gorman alluded to the role in an Instagram post.

Gorman's television credits include Masada, Renegade, Happy Days, MacGyver, The Drew Carey Show and a recurring guest-star roles on NCIS:LA and Sleepy Hollow. He also appeared in season one, episode two of Westworld.

In 2020, Gorman starred in the feature psychological thriller film Painter as the character Bill also known as The Gardener.

== Personal life ==
Gorman is fascinated by Japanese culture, particularly swords and calligraphy.

== Filmography ==
=== Film ===
Year	Title	Role	Notes
1975	Three Days of the Condor	Martin	
1976	Alice, Sweet Alice	Father Pat	
1979	The Concorde ... Airport '79	TV Announcer	Uncredited
1980	The Nude Bomb	French Delegate	
1980	Cheaper to Keep Her	Maitre d'	
1985	In the Shadow of Kilimanjaro	Eugene Kurtz	
1986	Wanted: Dead or Alive	Agent	
1988	Above the Law	CIA Interrogator	
1989	Bleeder & Bates	District Attorney	
1993	Gettysburg	John Bell Hood	
1994	On Deadly Ground	Oil Executive	
1994	Scanner Cop	Pathologist	Direct-to-video
1995	Wild Bill	Doctor	
1997	Wounded	Paramedic #1	
1999	Freshmen	Professor Palin	
2001	Room for Seven	Professor Daniels	
2003	Gods and Generals	John Bell Hood	
2006	George Bush Goes to Heaven	Martin Hatch	
2006	Shut Up and Shoot!	Raj's Security Guard	
2008	Disfigured	Marcus	
2008	Short Track	'Pops' Beckett	
2008	The Open Door	Male Detective	
2009	The Land That Time Forgot	Conrad	Direct-to-video
2010	American Bandits: Frank and Jesse James	Bartender	Direct-to-video
2010	Framily	Ethan's dad	
2011	Crimson Circle	The Father	
2013	Bukowski	Angry Farmer	
2013	Crimson Winter	Oracle	
2013	2 Dead 2 Kill	Dr. Mensch	
2014	Mile Marker Seven	Mr. Winslow	
2015	About Scout	Painting Man	
2015	Train Station	Man In Brown	
2016	13 Days	Mr. Winslow	
2016	Leaves of the Tree	Father John Callahan	
2016	Gehenna: Where Death Lives	Don Rodrigo	
2017	Born for a Storm	Andrew Jackson	Short film
2017	Like. Share. Follow.	Mr. Crossbow	
2019	Avengers: Endgame	Old Steve Rogers Double	
2020	Painter	The Gardener aka Bill	

=== Television ===
Year	Title	Role	Notes
1975	Ourstory	John Alden	Episode: "The Peach Gang"
1976	The Adams Chronicles	Senator #3	Episode: "Chapter V: John Adams, Vice President"
1977	Washington: Behind Closed Doors	FBI Agent	Episode: "Part 5"
1977	Logan's Run	David	Episode: "Logan's Run"
1977	Mary Jane Harper Cried Last Night	Police Officer	Television film
1977	The Bionic Woman	Mover	Episode: "Motorcycle Boogie"
1977	Hunter	Captain Meers	Episode: "U.F.M. 13"
1978	The Waltons	Denby	Episode: "The Changeling"
1979	Happy Days	Jacques Du Bois	Episode: "The Duel"
1979	The French Atlantic Affair	Wendell Cronin	Episode #1.3
1980	G.I.'s	British Officer	Television film
1980	ABC Afterschool Special	Jack Peters	Episode: "The Gymnast"
1981	Masada	Tribune	Miniseries
1981	Side Show	Ticket Taker	Television film
1983	Voyagers!	Willie	Episode: "Pursuit"
1983	Manimal	Billy's Father	Episode: "Illusion"
1984	Disney's All-Star Mother's Day Album	Narrator	Television film
1984, 1985	Cover Up	Dr. Lawrence / Crooked Doctor	2 episodes
1985	Robert Kennedy and His Times	John Gunther Dean	3 episodes
1986	Crossings	Doctor #2	2 episodes
1986	Assassin	Agent One	Television film
1986	MacGyver	Gilbert Arnaud	Episode: "The Road Not Taken"
1987	Fame	Morris	Episode: "Alice Doesn't Work Here Anymore"
1988	Second Chance	Maurice	Episode: "Viva Las Vegas: Part 2"
1988	Superman	Ship Computer	Episode: "Fugitive from Space/The Supermarket"
1990	TaleSpin	Prof. Martin Torque	Episode: "From Here to Machinery"
1990–1991	Generations	Claude Montreau	7 episodes
1991	Adam-12	Maitre d'	Episode: "Keep on Truckin'"
1993	And the Band Played On	Charles Dauget	Television film
1994, 1995	Renegade	Amos Crane / Joe Markham	2 episodes
1994–1996	Hurricanes	Voice	7 episodes
1995	The Avenging Angel	Jonathan Parker	Television film
1997	Rough Riders	Colonel, 71st NY	2 episodes
1998	Prey	Kestelmann	Episode: "Progeny"
2001	The Drew Carey Show	William Shakespeare	Episode: "Drew's in a Coma"
2005	It's Always Sunny in Philadelphia	Homeless Man	Episode: "The Gang Finds a Dead Guy"
2005	Alias	Flashback Desantis	Episode: "Out of the Box"
2005	Ghost Whisperer	Elderly Gentleman	Episode: "On the Wings of a Dove"
2008	Players at the Poker Palace	Mack	18 episodes
2008	The Young and the Restless	Father Dominique	3 episodes
2012	Castlevania: Hymn of Blood	Priest	Episode: "Live Action Fan Series"
2013	NCIS: Los Angeles	Hans Schreiber	Episode: "Reznikov, N."
2013–2015	Sleepy Hollow	Reverend Alfred Knapp	3 episodes
2014	Cinemassacre's Monster Madness	Father Pat	Episode: "Alice Sweet Alice"
2015	The Player	Arthur Westlake	Episode: "Ante Up"
2015	To Appomattox	Charles F. Smith	2 episodes
2016	Rizzoli & Isles	Oliver Davenport	Episode: "Yesterday, Today, Tomorrow"
2016	Westworld	Eye Patch	Episode: "Chestnut"
2016	Teen Wolf	Elias Stilinski / Tolbert	2 episodes
2017	Lo$T BoyZ	Santa Claus	Episode: "The Christmas Party"
2019	Abby's	Skip	7 episodes
2019	Into the Dark	Second Executive	Episode: "A Nasty Piece of Work"
