= Ezra Dagan =

Israeli actor

- עזרא דגן
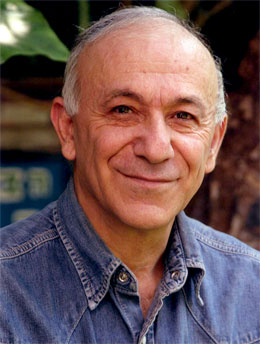
- Born: 2 April 1947 (age 78); United States
- Occupation: Actor
- Spouse(s): Tzila Dagan (divorced); Irit Dagan
- Children: 1, Guy Dagan (with Tzila Dagan)

Ezra Dagan (Hebrew: עזרא דגן; born April 2, 1947) is an Israeli actor noted for his acting in the Steven Spielberg film, Schindler's List (1993), where he portrayed the character Rabbi Menasha Lewartow.

== Filmography ==
Dagan also acted in films including Hunting Elephants (2012), The Attack (2012), The Other Son (2012), Mörderischer Besuch (TV movie) (2009), Naamonet (short) (1999), Body in the Sand (1996), The Revolutionary II (video) (1995), The Revolutionary (video) (1993), Schindler's List (1993), Me'Ahorei Hasoragim II (1986), Yaldei Stalin (1986), America 3000 (1983), Ha-Pachdani (1980), Festival Shirei Yeladim (1975), Nurith (1973), and A Gift from Heaven. In his career as a film artist, he has worked with Emmanuelle Devos (The Other Son), Ralph Fiennes (Schindler's List), Shmuel Shilo (Valdei Stalin) and Dori Ben-Zeev (Hasereth Festival Hayeladim).

Year	Title	Role	Notes
1972	Nurith		
1973	Matana Mishamayim		
1980	Ha-Pachdani	Pinhasi	
1980	Festival Shirei Yeladim		
1983	America 3000	Amie	
1986	Yaldei Stalin		
1986	Me'Ahorei Hasoragim II	Mr. Feldman	
1993	Schindler's List	Rabbi Menasha Levartov	
1999	Gufa BaCholot		
2010	Gei Oni	Isser	
2012	The Other Son	Le rabbin	
2012	The Attack	Ezra Benhaim	
2012	Hunting Elephants		
2023	The Delegation		
