= Bayard Johnson =

American film director

Bayard Richard Johnson
- Born: September 9, 1952; Seattle, Washington, U.S.
- Died: February 10, 2016 (aged 63); Los Angeles, California, U.S.
- Education: University of Puget Sound
- Occupations: Screenwriter, film producer, author, musician
- Spouse: Lyndal Johnson
- Children: Colter Johnson, Ronan Johnson
- Parent(s): Richard Johnson, Virginia Johnson

Bayard Richard Johnson (September 9, 1952 – February 10, 2016) was an American screenwriter and film producer. He is best known as the co-writer of Damned River in 1989, The Second Jungle Book: Mowgli & Baloo, and Tarzan and the Lost City in 1998.

== Early life ==
Johnson, who was born in Seattle, graduated from the University of Puget Sound, where he studied philosophy and writing.

== Career ==
Johnson's first film was 1989's Damned River, which he co-wrote with John Crowther. Damned River, which was filmed in Zimbabwe in 1988, remains on Netflix's "top 20 action movies of the 1980s," as of 2016. Together with Matthew Horton, Johnson co-wrote the 1997 film adaptation of The Second Jungle Book: Mowgli & Baloo, which was released by TriStar Pictures. He also co-wrote 1998's Tarzan and the Lost City, loosely based on the Tarzan stories by stories by Edgar Rice Burroughs.

In 2007, Johnson and actor Bill Duke co-produced Cover, a film which explores the HIV epidemic. Duke and Johnson also wrote a television series for HBO, which did not air.

Johnson co-authored the 2013 book, "If You’ve Forgotten the Names of the Clouds, You’ve Lost Your Way: An Introduction to American Indian Thought and Philosophy," with the late Russell Means, an Oglala Lakota Native American rights activist. Together, John and Means directed, produced and penned Looks Twice, a short film based on a Lakota story. Johnson's first novel was "Damned Right," published by Black Ice Books in 1994.

In addition to his writing, Johnson co-founded Mother Nature's Army, a band based in Southern California.

== Death ==
Johnson died from cancer on February 10, 2016, in Los Angeles, California, on the age of 63. He was survived by his parents, Richard and Virginia Johnson; his wife, Lyndal; two sons, Colter and Ronan; and three siblings, Douglas, Silver Moon and Alicia. One of his sons, Colter Johnson, penned and directed the 2015 film, Man in a Cage, which has not yet been released.
