= John Terlesky =

American actor

- Born: John Todd Terlesky; May 30, 1961 (age 64); Cincinnati, Ohio, U.S.
- Other names: Jon Terlesky; J.T. Terlesky
- Occupations: Actor, film director, television director, screenwriter
- Years active: 1984–present
- Spouse(s): Jayne Brook (1996–present; 2 children)

John Todd Terlesky (born May 30, 1961) is an American actor, film director, television director and screenwriter. As an actor, he is known for playing Deathstalker in the 1987 film Deathstalker II, and Mike in Chopping Mall (1986).

== Life and career ==
Terlesky was born in Cincinnati, Ohio, on May 30, 1961. Since the mid-1980s, Terlesky has acted in a number of films and television series. His first notable television role was in the NBC drama Legmen. His other television credits include The Facts of Life, V, Our House, Empty Nest, Walker, Texas Ranger, a recurring role on Guns of Paradise and co-starring in the sitcom The Last Frontier.

Some of Terlesky's film acting credits include Secret Admirer (1985), The Naked Cage (1986), Chopping Mall (1986), Valet Girls (1987), The Allnighter (1987), Deathstalker II (1987), Appointment with Death (1988), Damned River (1989) and Crazy People (1990).

In 1998, Terlesky made his directorial debut with the film The Pandora Project, co-directing with Jim Wynorski. He directed a number of other independent, direct-to-video and television films before getting involved in episodic television. Since 2006, he has directed episodes of Boston Legal, Grey's Anatomy, Ugly Betty, Drop Dead Diva, Human Target, Army Wives, Body of Proof, Gossip Girl, Castle, Agents of S.H.I.E.L.D., How To Get Away With Murder, The Blacklist (TV series), and Criminal Minds.

== Filmography ==
=== Movies ===
Year	Title	Role	Notes
1985	Secret Admirer	Rick	
1986	The Naked Cage	Willy	
1986	Chopping Mall	Mike Brennan	
1987	Valet Girls	Archie Lee Samples	
1987	The Allnighter	C.J.	
1987	Deathstalker II	Deathstalker	Video
1988	Appointment with Death	Raymond Boynton	
1989	Damned River	Carl	
1990	Crazy People	Adam Burgess	
1993	The Last Job	Father	Short
1993	Little Miss Millions	Randolph Palmer (uncredited)	
1995	Hard Bounty	Carver	
1996	Vampirella	Astronaut #2	Video
1998	Storm Trooper	Shotgun	Video
1999	Judgment Day	Payne's Shooter (uncredited)	Video
2001	Guardian	Director	
2003	Written in Blood	Guard #2	

=== Television ===
Year	Title	Role	Notes
1984	Legmen	David Taylor	6 Episodes
1984	The Facts of Life	Rich Thompson	1 Episode, My Boyfriend's Back
1985	Consenting Adult	Pete Roberts	TV movie
1985	V	Dead Guy (uncredited)	1 Episode, The Wildcats
1988	High Mountain Rangers	Chaz Collins	1 Episode, Matt's Choice
1988	Our House	Scott	2 Episodes
1988	Longarm	Deputy US Marshal Custis Long	TV movie
1989	Nightingales	Phillip Danlow	4 Episodes
1989	CBS Summer Playhouse	Frank Cabell	1 Episode, Curse of the Corn People
1989	Nashville Beat	'Stick'	TV movie
1989	When He's Not a Stranger	Ron Cooper	TV movie
1989	The Famous Teddy Z	Ryan Lane	1 Episode, Teddy Gets a House Guest
1990	The Love Boat: A Valentine Voyage	Chris Male nurse	TV movie
1990	Bar Girls	Gabe Shriver	TV movie
1990	Empty Nest	Bucky Barnes	1 Episode, There's No Accounting
1991	Paradise	Dakota	13 Episodes
1992	Battling for Baby	Phillip	TV movie
1992	Grapevine	Greg	1 Episode, The Katie and Adam Story
1993	Sirens	Officer #1 Dan Kelly	
1995	Walker, Texas Ranger	Pete Battle	1 Episode, Mean Streets
1995	All-American Girl	Tim	1 Episode, Young Americans
1996	Murder, She Wrote	Vince DeNisco	1 Episode, Murder Among Friends
1996	Voice from the Grave	Bill Perkins	TV movie
1996	The Last Frontier	Reed Garfield	6 Episodes
2005	Cerberus	Willis (uncredited)	TV movie
2005	CSI: Miami	Larry Van Owen	1 Episode, Nothing to Lose
2021	Zoey's Extraordinary Playlist	Director	4 episodes
2021	The Blacklist	Director	episode #172: "Godwin Page"
2023–2024	The Irrational	Director	2 episodes
2025	The Rookie	Director	Episode: "The Return"

== Personal life ==
Terlesky is married to actress Jayne Brook.
