= A Balloon in Mid-Air =

1875 painting by Jules Tavernier

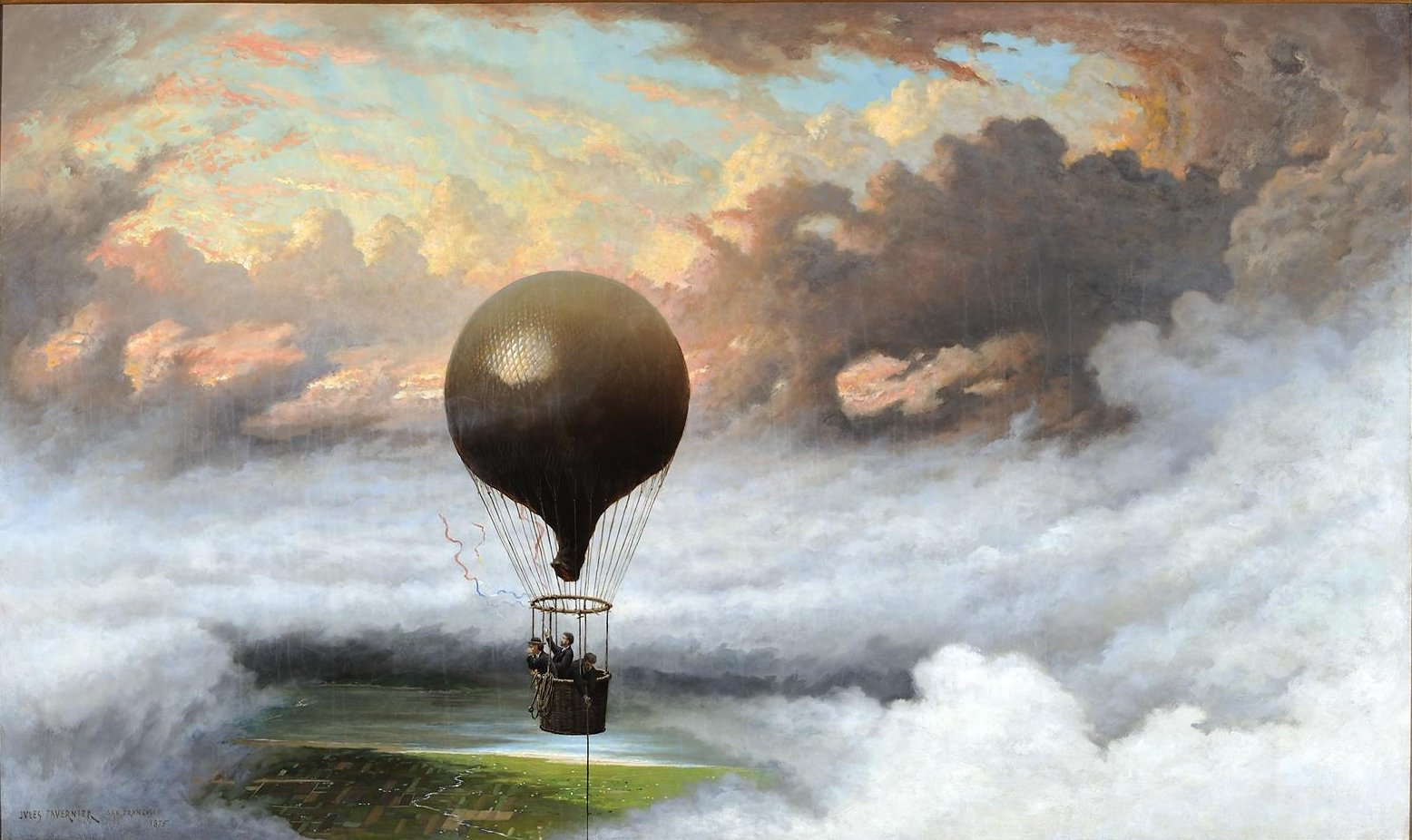
- Artist: Jules Tavernier
- Year: 1875
- Medium: oil paint, canvas
- Subject: gas balloon
- Dimensions: 76.2 cm (30.0 in) × 127 cm (50 in)
- Location: private collection

A Balloon in Mid-Air is an 1875 aerial landscape painting by French illustrator and painter Jules Tavernier. The work is thought to be based on a gas balloon ride the artist took in October 1874 from San Francisco to the East Bay on the Sierra Nevada, a balloon operated by aeronaut Étienne Buislay of Woodward's Gardens. Buislay died in a balloon accident a week after their trip.

The work was Tavernier's first major painting and first major success on the West Coast. For the next decade, from 1874 to 1884, Tavernier mostly focused on California regional art, featuring the San Francisco Bay Area, the North Coast, the Central Coast, and the Sierra Nevada. A Balloon in Mid-Air is one of more than 25 works he completed within the Bay Area series.

After Tavernier's death in 1889, his work fell into semi-obscurity for over a century, but the painting received new attention with an exhibition at the Crocker Art Museum in Sacramento in 2014.

== Background ==
=== Arrival ===
Before arriving in California in the summer of 1874, French artist Jules Tavernier had spent the previous seven months traveling across the United States on assignment for Harper's Weekly. Joined by fellow artist Paul Frenzeny, they were tasked with creating illustrations of the American West, a job made possible by the opening of the first transcontinental railroad in 1869. They separated in Cheyenne, Wyoming, with Tavernier continuing to Nebraska and then Utah. Their plan was to meet up in San Francisco. Frenzeny arrived first in the city sometime in July or so, with Tavernier arriving a month later in August.

Journalist Daniel O'Connell, co-founder of the Bohemian Club, first found Tavernier illegally sunbathing in the nude on Black Point Beach. Convincing him to put on clothes lest he be arrested, the two soon became friends. Tavernier was renting a small studio above a macaroni factory in North Beach at the time. He continued making illustrations with Frenzeny for Harper's for the next year, but once he got settled into San Francisco, he began to transition back to painting. By August, he began creating his first artworks in California for the Bohemian Club. Known as the "jinks" cartoon series, they were designed for a monthly event that the club produced to entertain its members. Tavernier would continue with his "jinks" series until 1879, at which point he began to fall away from the group.

=== Pleasure gardens, balloon mania ===
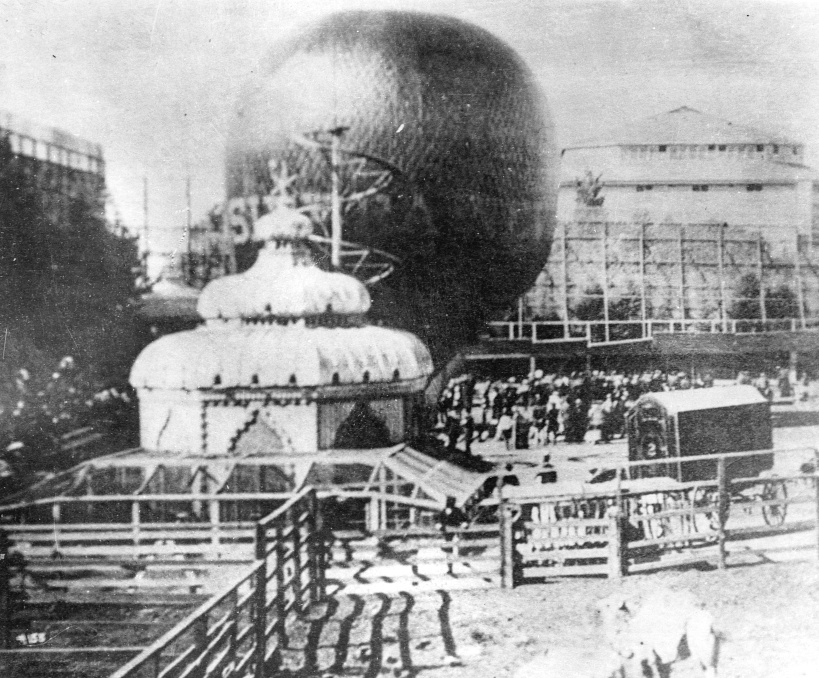
In 1874, Tavernier made two ascents in the Sierra Nevada gas balloon at Woodward's Gardens.

Following the California gold rush, San Francisco began offering more leisure activities, such as circuses and theaters, and building pleasure gardens, or amusement parks. Historian John S. Hittell made note of this trend in his history of the city. German immigrant Christian Russ was the first to open Russ Garden in 1853, which was popular for picnics and celebrations. It was followed by the Willows in 1860 and Woodward's Gardens in 1866, which became the most popular pleasure garden in the city until 1893.

Balloon mania was at its height in the 1870s, with amusement parks throughout the city offering Sunday gas balloon rides known as "balloon ascensions". These ascents were often risky and dangerous. The original ascents at Woodward's Gardens were tethered and flown up to an altitude of 900 feet (275 meters) by Rhode Island balloonist James Allen, an early American aeronaut notable for his role in the history of military ballooning and his participation in the Union Army Balloon Corps during the American Civil War.

By the time Tavernier and Frenzeny took their rides at Woodward's Gardens in September and October, the balloon was flying free and untethered under Étienne Buislay, the new chief aeronaut. Buislay, whom art historian Claudine Chalmers describes as a "crazy Frenchman", was known for his balloon stunts, races, and circus-like acrobatics performed from a trapeze suspended beneath the balloon—often without a pilot. Aviation historian Tom D. Crouch notes that Buislay's showmanship was "extraordinarily dangerous" as the balloon flew without any guidance. Tavernier and Frenzeny's balloon ascents were covered by local media in some depth as they were both considered celebrities due to their work with Harper's.

=== California period, 1874–1884 ===
Tavernier did not plan on staying in San Francisco. He originally wanted to continue his journey to Japan and then make his way back to Europe by Christmas to visit his mother. By October 1874, Tavernier was inducted into the Bohemian Club as an official member. His temporary stay turned into ten years, as he became an important part of the social and cultural fabric of the artist community in the Bay Area. In 1875, Tavernier would lay the earliest foundations for the Monterey Peninsula art colony. Just before or after A Balloon in Mid-Air was first exhibited in April, Frenzeny and Tavernier had a falling out over money that ended their working relationship.

After several years in Monterey, Tavernier returned to San Francisco and took up residence in the Montgomery Block, the city's center for bohemian art in the 1880s. Tavernier was vice-president of the San Francisco Art Association, which caused some problems for the members, as he gave long speeches at 300 words per minute in Franglais, making him difficult to understand. He ultimately left California for Hawaii in 1884. Just a few months before his death in Honolulu in May 1889, Tavernier was preparing a black and white sketch of a gas balloon scene featuring a balloon-parachute act by aeronaut and daredevil performer "Professor Melville" (Emil Leandro Melville).

== Balloon ascensions ==
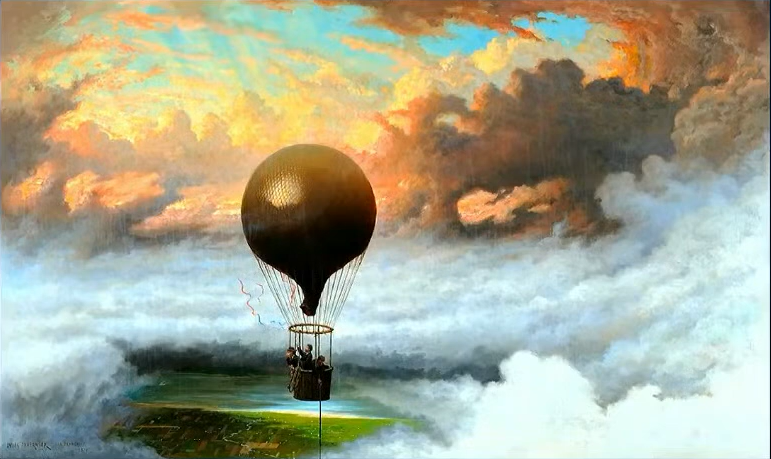
A photo of the painting showing more vibrant color presented by Claudine Chalmers for the 2022 exhibition Jules Tavernier and the Elem Pomo

=== September crash ===
In preparation for a busy weekend celebrating California pioneers, Tavernier took the first of two gas balloon rides on the Sierra Nevada at Woodward's Gardens on September 9, 1874, California Admission Day. Joining Tavernier in the balloon was his friend and fellow artist Paul Frenzeny, editor Thomas Newcomb of The Morning Call (and co-founder of the Bohemian Club), and chief aeronaut Étienne Buislay and his brother.

The balloon crashed shortly after takeoff and threw the passengers to the ground, injuring several people. Newcomb was left with two fractures in his right forearm while Buislay suffered some major bruising; Tavernier and Frenzeny were unharmed. Reports from The Daily Alta California said the excursion was poorly managed, as the gondola was carrying five people, well above its design limit of three. The Alta observed that it was "a miracle how any one of them escaped with his life".

=== October voyage ===
The painting of A Balloon in Mid-Air is inspired by Tavernier's second gas balloon ascent from Woodward's Garden aboard the Sierra Nevada on October 4, 1874. He again boarded the gondola with his colleague Paul Frenzeny. Joining them was reporter David McRoberts of The Morning Call, with the balloon once again under the command of chief aeronaut Etienne Buislay. The people who gathered to watch the balloon ascension were said to be unruly, forcing the proprietor, Robert B. Woodward, to use his cane for crowd control. After waiting some time to complete the inflation process, the balloon successfully took flight around 3:20 p.m. that afternoon and rose with the wind while drifting towards the northwest.

Soon after takeoff, the balloon appeared to lose altitude near the hill of California Street, but the crew released ballast and it quickly rose higher and proceeded to float across the entire San Francisco Bay. As it flew over the East Bay, it was blown off course. This was a common occurrence, with some balloon rides going so far off course that they ended up landing a great distance away, sometimes requiring the passengers to walk home for several days. In the East Bay, the balloon was spotted heading in the direction of Oakland.

Approximately two hours after takeoff, the Sierra Nevada was spotted near San Leandro, but was lost in the fog. Landing was a priority due to limited supplies of ballast. Eventually, they made a safe landing near Oakland and the passengers returned to the city by boat later that same night. Just one week later, Buislay was involved in a fatal balloon accident while landing near Bernal Heights, with the wind throwing him to his death on the rocks. (Note: "Étienne Buislay" was the stage name of Joseph Gruet, a balloonist and acrobat, often combining the two in risky and dangerous shows at Woodward's Gardens. Tom D. Crouch: "Gruet inherited the position of chief aeronaut at Woodward's Garden [from James Allen]. He continued to fly through the summer and fall of 1874...He particularly delighted in performing acrobatic stunts on a trapeze bar in place of a basket beneath his balloon...on October 11, 1874...Having performed his stunts on the bar, the acrobat rode the balloon to a safe landing, only to become tangled in some dangling lines. Carried back into the air by a sudden gust and with the air in the balloon cooling rapidly, Gruet fell onto the rocks of Bernal Heights. There he was found unconscious with severe cuts and bruises as well as head and internal injuries. Paralyzed from the waist down, he was carried to his home, where he died several days later." [brackets added])

Six months later, in early April 1875, Tavernier completed a painting based on their shared adventure from the previous year.

== Description ==
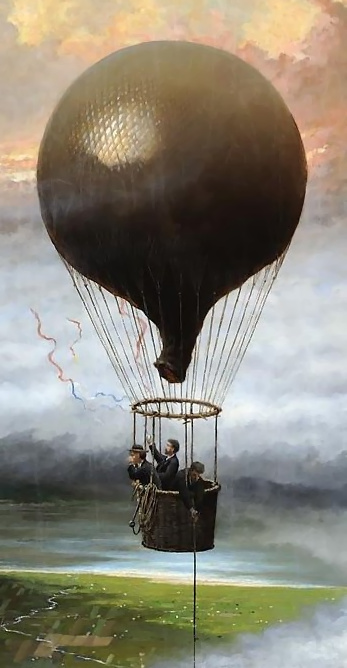
Detail of the passengers in the gondola

The painting depicts a gas balloon flying at a high altitude with three passengers visible in the basket or gondola. Through the fog, land and water can be seen far below. Pink clouds are visible, indicating that the sun has recently set. The painting only depicts three passengers, even though the actual trip it is based on involved four. The figure in the back of the gondola is seen with his right hand held up and colorful streamers aloft fluttering above and to the left, as if measuring the wind to determine their direction and speed. The figure on the left in front appears to be looking through opera glasses and observing their current course and view. These glasses were distributed to the passengers just prior to the flight. The third person is leaning over the gondola and handling a rope, perhaps a drag rope or ballast tied to a rope, or maybe even a bit of artistic license. The painting is signed "Jules Tavernier San Francisco 1875" in the lower left-hand corner of the canvas.

== Reception ==
A Balloon in Mid-Air was first shown at the Beaux Arts Gallery on April 24, 1875. The gallery was owned by art dealer Joseph Roos, whom Tavernier and Frenzeny had met in Monterey in December of the previous year. Art critics said it lived up to the tenets of John Ruskin (who argued that clouds should be depicted faithfully). Chalmers described it as Tavernier's first major success on the West Coast.

Robert Nichols Ewing notes that Tavernier's work in general shows the influence of the picturesque style and Barbizon school romanticism, but his work in the 1870s leans more specifically towards the juste milieu. Art critic Victoria Dalkey describes A Balloon in Mid-Air as an uncharacteristic work when compared to Tavernier's other oil paintings. Dalkey notes that Tavernier is still steeped in the style of an illustrator, rather than a painter.

Art & Antiques magazine describes the painting as one of Tavernier's best-known works, noting that its high altitude aerial perspective from a gas balloon was unprecedented for the time as most artists were not flying around in balloons painting landscapes. (Note: French photographer Nadar (1820–1910) famously captured the first aerial photographs from a tethered balloon in 1858, but the photos have been lost or destroyed. The first photos taken from a free-flying balloon were reportedly captured by a "M. P. Desmarets" in 1880, five years after this painting.) The painting, Art & Antiques argues, also illustrates a contemporaneous dichotomy (Note: See for example: The Machine in the Garden: Technology and the Pastoral Ideal in America (1964).) that was common to that era, one that was opposed between the pastoral ideal and the rise of technology and industrialization.

== Provenance and exhibition ==
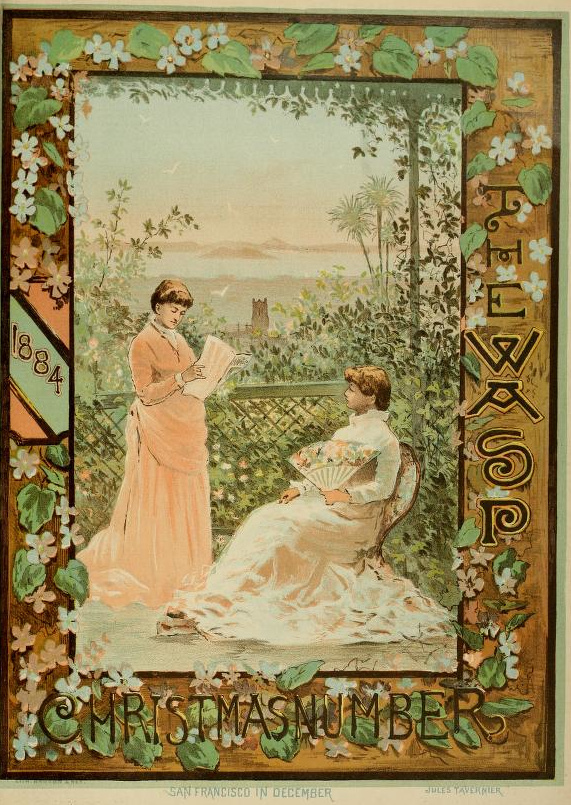
San Francisco in December (1884), featuring Old St. Mary's Cathedral, the San Francisco Bay, Yerba Buena Island, Oakland, and Mount Diablo

It is believed that Tavernier gave the painting to David McRoberts, a reporter with The Morning Call who had been a passenger in the second balloon trip upon which the work is based. The painting is currently held in a private collection. After Tavernier's death in 1889, his contributions faded out of public memory and were mostly forgotten by American art historians. In 2014, A Balloon in Mid-Air was loaned and exhibited to the Crocker Art Museum for the first ever survey of his work. The exhibition later traveled to the Monterey Museum of Art.

== Other Bay Area works ==
A Balloon in Mid-Air was Tavernier's first major painting in California and the San Francisco Bay Area. San Francisco in December, a magazine cover he completed for The Wasp in 1884, was one of his last. Some of his works, like the two panels he completed for the Mark Hopkins Mansion in 1879, were destroyed in the San Francisco Fire after the 1906 earthquake. (Note: Given their titles (A Moorish Castle and Cathedral Interior) it is unlikely the Mark Hopkins Mansion works were concerned with the topic of the Bay Area.) Seven illustrations in the San Francisco Chinatown series are excluded from this list because they are the work of Paul Frenzeny alone, even though they were signed by both artists as part of their agreement with Harper's.

Other works, such as the many engravings, sketches, and paintings Tavernier completed for most of the "jinks" series and throughout the North Coast, Central Coast and the Sierra Nevada mountains are not included as they either depict topics outside of the Bay Area or lie themselves outside the borders of the greater Bay Area. This is an incomplete list of Tavernier's specific Bay Area works created during his California period of which A Balloon in Mid-Air is a part:

1. The Old Cobweb Palace Saloon (after 1874)
2. In Wildwood Glen, Saucelito (Sausalito) (1875)
3. The Suburbs of San Francisco—San Rafael (with Paul Frenzeny, 1875)
4. The Suburbs of San Francisco—The Pic-nic Ground (with Paul Frenzeny, 1875)
5. The Suburbs of San Francisco—Mount Tamalpais (with Paul Frenzeny, 1875)
6. The Suburbs of San Francisco—Lagunitos Lake (with Paul Frenzeny, 1875)
7. The Suburbs of San Francisco—Blue Gum Tree (with Paul Frenzeny, 1875)
8. The Suburbs of San Francisco—Quentin Point Landing (with Paul Frenzeny, 1875)
9. Around the Campfire (Encampment in the Redwoods) (1875)
10. Mountains of Santa Cruz (ca. 1875-1880)
11. Santa Rosa (1877)
12. California 1849 (Indian Maiden), (depicts the San Francisco Bay, 1878)
13. Illumination and Salute on the Sand Lots - General Grant at San Francisco (with Theodore Robinson, 1879)
14. On San Francisco Bay (1879)
15. Marin Sunset in Back of Petaluma (1880)
16. Bohemian Grove (1880)
17. Cremation of Care (1880)
18. Russian River Scene (ca. 1880-1884)
19. April Showers, Napa Valley (ca. 1880-1884)
20. Cloudy Day, North Beach (Atlantic Gardens) (1881)
21. Cabin in the Redwoods (1883)
22. Mountain Landscape, Russian River (1883)
23. Among the Giant Redwoods (1883)
24. Redwoods at Russian River (1884)
25. San Francisco in December (1884)
