= The Jungle Book =

1894 children's book by Rudyard Kipling

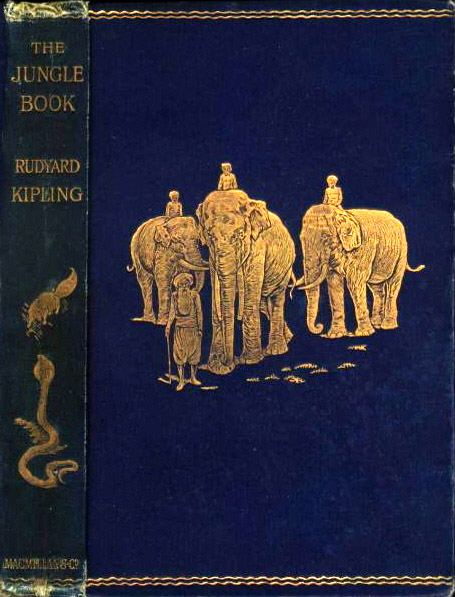
- Embossed cover of first edition with artwork by John Lockwood Kipling
- Author: Rudyard Kipling
- Illustrator: John Lockwood Kipling (Rudyard's father)
- Language: English
- Series: The Jungle Book
- Genre: Children's book
- Publisher: Macmillan
- Publication date: 1894
- Publication place: United Kingdom
- Preceded by: "In the Rukh"
- Followed by: The Second Jungle Book
- Text: The Jungle Book at Wikisource

The Jungle Book is an 1894 collection of stories by the English author Rudyard Kipling. Most of the characters are animals such as Shere Khan the tiger and Baloo the bear, though a principal character is the boy or "man-cub" Mowgli, who is raised in the jungle by wolves. Most stories are set in a dry forest in India; one place mentioned repeatedly is "Seeonee" (Seoni), in the central state of Madhya Pradesh.

A major theme in the book is abandonment followed by fostering, as in the life of Mowgli, echoing Kipling's own childhood. The theme is echoed in the triumph of protagonists including Rikki-Tikki-Tavi and The White Seal over their enemies, as well as Mowgli's. Another important theme is of law and freedom; the stories are not about animal behaviour, still less about the Darwinian struggle for survival, but about human archetypes in animal form. They teach respect for authority, obedience, and knowing one's place in society with "the law of the jungle", but the stories also illustrate the freedom to move between different worlds, such as when Mowgli moves between the jungle and the village. Critics have also noted the essential wildness and lawless energies in the stories, reflecting the irresponsible side of human nature.

The Jungle Book has remained popular, partly through its many adaptations for film and other media. Critics such as Swati Singh have noted that even critics wary of Kipling for his supposed imperialism have admired the power of his storytelling. The book has been influential in the scout movement, whose founder, Robert Baden-Powell, was a friend of Kipling. Percy Grainger composed his Jungle Book Cycle around quotations from the book.

== Context ==
Rudyard Kipling's stories were first printed in magazines in 1893 and 1894; the original publications also contained hand-sketched illustrations, with some from John Lockwood Kipling, his father. Rudyard himself was born in Mumbai—then referred to as Bombay—in the western coastal Indian state of Maharashtra, where he spent his first six years of life. After around 10 years back in England, and having completed his schooling, Kipling went back to India to work for nearly 6½ years. Later on, his original stories would be written when he lived at Naulakha, the property and home he owned in Dummerston, Vermont, US. There is evidence that Kipling wrote the collection of stories for his daughter, Josephine (who died from pneumonia in 1899, aged 6); a first-edition copy of the book—including a handwritten note by the author to his young daughter—was discovered at the National Trust's Wimpole Hall, Cambridgeshire, in 2010.

== Book ==
=== Description ===
The tales in the book (as well as those in The Second Jungle Book, which followed in 1895 and includes eight further stories, including five about Mowgli) are fables, using animals in an anthropomorphic manner to teach moral lessons. The verses of "The Law of the Jungle", for example, lay down rules for the safety of individuals, families, and communities. Kipling put in them nearly everything he knew or "heard or dreamed about the Indian jungle". Other readers have interpreted the work as allegories of the politics and society of the time.

=== Origins ===
Places in India named by Kipling in versions of the stories

The stories in The Jungle Book were inspired in part by the ancient Indian fable texts such as the Panchatantra and the Jataka tales. For example, an older moral-filled mongoose and snake version of the "Rikki-Tikki-Tavi" story by Kipling is found in Book 5 of Panchatantra. In a letter to the American author Edward Everett Hale, Kipling wrote:

The idea of beast-tales seems to me new in that it is a most ancient and long forgotten idea. The really fascinating tales are those that the Bodhisat tells of his previous incarnations ending always with the beautiful moral. Most of the native hunters in India today think pretty much along the lines of an animal's brain and I have "cribbed" freely from their tales.

— Rudyard Kipling

In a letter written and signed by Kipling in or around 1895, states Alison Flood in The Guardian, Kipling confesses to borrowing ideas and stories in the Jungle Book: "I am afraid that all that code in its outlines has been manufactured to meet 'the necessities of the case': though a little of it is bodily taken from (Southern) Esquimaux rules for the division of spoils. In fact, it is extremely possible that I have helped myself promiscuously but at present cannot remember from whose stories I have stolen".

Shere Khan, the main antagonist of the story, is named after the historical Afghan Emperor Sher Shah Suri. The character of Mowgli may have been inspired by William Henry Sleeman's accounts of feral children nurtured by wolves.

=== Setting ===
Kipling lived in India as a child, and most of the stories (Note: "The White Seal" is set in the Pribilof Islands in the Bering Sea.) are evidently set there, though it is not entirely clear where. The Kipling Society notes that "Seeonee" (Seoni, in the central Indian state of Madhya Pradesh) is mentioned several times; that the "cold lairs" must be in the jungled hills of Chittorgarh; and that the first Mowgli story, "In the Rukh", is set in a forest reserve somewhere in North India, south of Simla. "Mowgli's Brothers" was positioned in the Aravalli hills of Rajasthan (northwestern India) in an early manuscript, later changed to Seonee, and Bagheera treks from "Oodeypore" (Udaipur), a journey of reasonable length to Aravalli but a long way from Seoni. Seoni has a tropical savanna climate, with a dry and a rainy season. This is drier than a monsoon climate and does not support tropical rainforest. Forested parks and reserves that claim to be associated with the stories include Kanha Tiger Reserve, Madhya Pradesh, and Pench National Park, near Seoni, but Kipling never visited the area.

== Chapters ==
The book is arranged with a story in each chapter. Each story is followed by a poem that serves as an epigram.

Story title	Summary	Epigrammatic poem	Notes	Image
Mowgli's Brothers	A boy is raised by wolves in the Indian jungle with the help of Baloo the bear and Bagheera the black panther, who teach him the "Law of the Jungle". Some years later, the wolfpack and Mowgli are threatened by the tiger Shere Khan. Mowgli brings fire, driving off Shere Khan but showing that he is a man and must leave the jungle.	"Hunting-Song of the Seeonee Pack"	The story has been published as a short book: Night-Song in the Jungle.	"The tiger's roar filled the cave with thunder". 1894
Kaa's Hunting	During the time Mowgli was with the wolf pack, he is abducted by the Bandar-log ("monkey lads") to the ruined city. Baloo and Bagheera set out to rescue him with Kaa the python. Kaa defeats the Bandar-log, frees Mowgli, and hypnotises the monkeys and the other animals with his dance. Mowgli rescues Baloo and Bagheera from the spell.	"Road Song of the Bandar-Log"		Mowgli made leader of the Bandar-log by John Charles Dollman, 1903
Tiger! Tiger!	Mowgli returns to the human village and is adopted by Messua and her husband, who believe him to be their long-lost son. Mowgli leads the village boys who herd the village's buffaloes. Shere Khan comes to hunt Mowgli, but he is warned by Gray Brother wolf, and with Akela they find Shere Khan asleep, and stampede the buffaloes to trample Shere Khan to death. Mowgli leaves the village, and goes back to hunt with the wolves until he becomes a man.	"Mowgli's Song"	The story's title is taken from William Blake's 1794 poem "The Tyger".	Tiger! Tiger! by W. H. Drake, 1894
The White Seal	Kotick, a rare white-furred fur seal, sees seals being killed by islanders in the Bering Sea. He decides to find a safe home for his people, and after several years of searching as he comes of age, eventually finds a suitable place. He returns home and persuades the other seals to follow him.	"Lukannon"	Many names in the story are Russian, (Note: Many of the 'animal language' words and names in this story are a phonetic spelling of Russian (probably as spoken with an Aleut accent), for example 'Stareek!' (Старик!) 'old man!'; 'Ochen scoochnie' (said by Kotick) 'I am very lonesome' Очень скучный (correctly means 'very boring'); holluschick (plural -ie) 'bachelor male seal' (холощик) from холостой ('unmarried'); Matkah (Kotick's mother, матка, 'dam', 'mother of an animal', or 'womb').) as the Pribilof Islands had been bought (with Alaska) by the United States in 1867, and Kipling had access to books about the islands.	The White Seal, 1894
Rikki-Tikki-Tavi	An English family have just moved to a house in India. They find Rikki-Tikki-Tavi the mongoose flooded out of his burrow. A pair of large cobras, Nag and Nagaina, attempt unsuccessfully to kill him. He hears the cobras plotting to kill the father in the house, and attacks Nag in the bathroom. The sound of the fight attracts the father, who shoots Nag. Rikki-Tikki-Tavi destroys Nagaina's eggs and chases her into her "rat-hole" where he kills her too.	"Darzee's Chaunt"	This story has been published as a short book.	Nag and Rikki-Tikki-Tavi, 1894
Toomai of the Elephants	Big Toomai rides Kala Nag the elephant to catch wild elephants in the hills. His son Little Toomai comes to help and risks his life throwing a rope up to one of the drivers. His father forbids him to enter the elephant enclosure again "until he has seen the elephants dance" (which no man ever did). One night he follows the elephants walking without drivers out of the camp, and is picked up by Kala Nag; he rides into the elephants' meeting place in the jungle, where they dance. On his return he says "I've seen the elephants dance" and falls asleep from tiredness. The drivers follow the elephants' tracks into the forest and find a newly cleared glade, showing that Little Toomai has told the truth. When they come back, he is hailed by both hunters and elephants, and the oldest and wisest hunter says that when Little Toomai grows up, he'll be called Toomai of the Elephants like his grandfather.	"Shiv and the Grasshopper"	This story has been published as a short book, and was the basis of the 1937 film Elephant Boy.	Toomai at the elephant camp, 1894
Her Majesty's Servants (Note: Originally titled "Servants of the Queen".)	On the night before a British military parade for the Amir of Afghanistan, the army's working animals—mule, camel, horse, bullock, elephant—discuss what they do in battle and how they feel about their work. It is explained to the Afghans that men and animals obey the orders carried down from the Queen.	"Parade-Song of the Camp Animals" is set to the tunes of several well-known songs. (Note: "Cavalry Horses" is set to "Bonnie Dundee". "Elephants of the Gun-Teams" fits the tune and has a similar first line to the marching song "The British Grenadiers", as does "Gun-Bullocks". "Screw-Gun Mules" is set to the tune of the English folk song "The Lincolnshire Poacher" and echoes some of its lines.)		"'Anybody can be forgiven for being scared in the night'", said the Troop-Horse. 1894

=== Characters ===
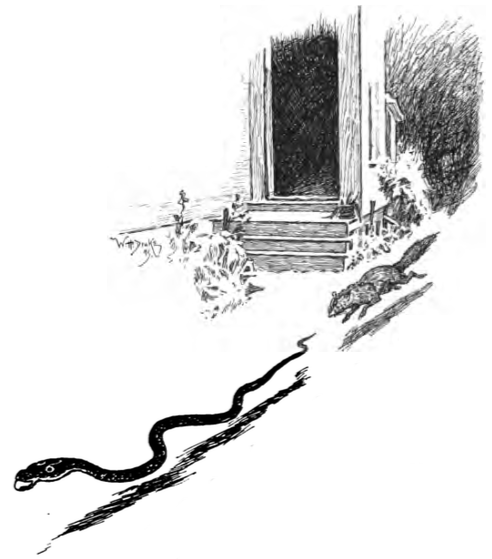
Rikki-Tikki-Tavi pursuing Nagaina by W. H. Drake. First edition, 1894

Many of the characters (marked *) are named simply after the Hindustani names of their species: for example, Baloo is a transliteration of Hindustani भालू/بھالو Bhālū, "bear". The characters (marked ^) from "The White Seal" are transliterations from the Russian of the Pribilof Islands.

- Akela * – a wolf
- Bagheera * – a black panther
- Baloo * – a bear
- Bandar-log * (Note: Bandar-log means "Monkey People" in Hindustani.) – a tribe of monkeys
- Chil * – a kite, in earlier editions called Rann (रण Raṇ, "battle")
- Chuchundra * – an Asian house shrew, called muskrat in the book
- Darzee * (Note: Darzee is the Hindustani for tailor.) – a tailorbird
- Father Wolf – the father wolf who raised Mowgli as his own cub
- Grey brother – one of Mother and Father Wolf's cubs
- Hathi * – an Indian elephant
- Ikki * – a porcupine
- Kaa * – a python
- Karait * – a krait
- Kotick ^ – a white seal
- Mang * – a bat
- Mor * – an Indian peafowl
- Mowgli – main character of the Mowgli stories, the young jungle boy
- Nag * – a male cobra
- Nagaina * – a female cobra, Nag's mate
- Raksha (Note: Raksha is Hindi for "defence".) – the Mother wolf who raised Mowgli as her own cub
- Rikki-Tikki-Tavi – a mongoose
- Sea Catch ^ – a seal and Kotick's father
- Sea Cow – a (Steller's) sea cow
- Sea Vitch ^ – a walrus
- Shere Khan * – a tiger
- Tabaqui * – a jackal

=== Illustrations ===
The early editions were illustrated with drawings in the text by John Lockwood Kipling (Rudyard's father), and the American artists W. H. Drake and Paul Frenzeny.

=== Editions and translations ===
The book has appeared in over 500 print editions, and over 100 audiobooks. It has been translated into at least 36 languages. In 2024, page proofs of the book were donated to Cambridge University Library.

== Themes ==
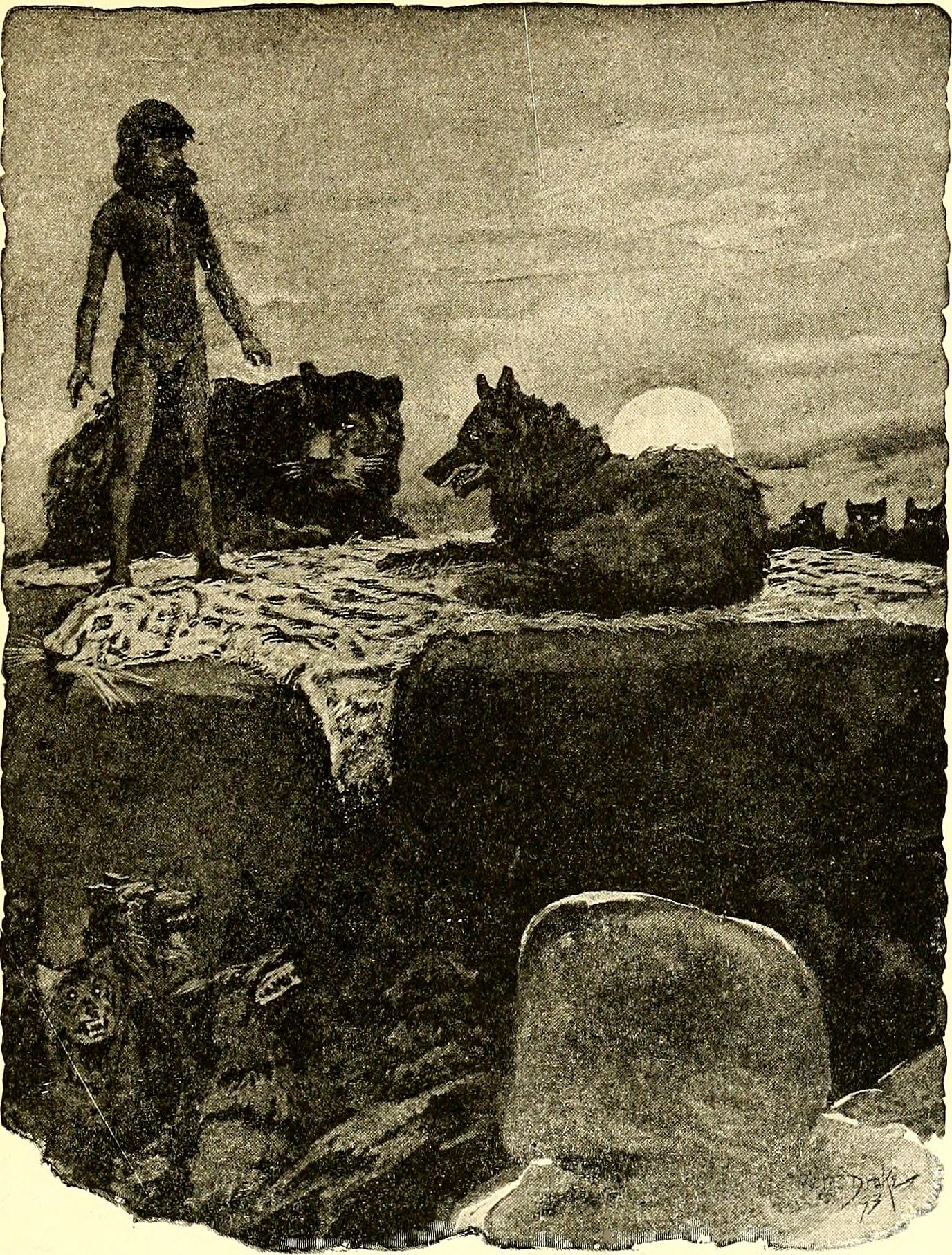
Mowgli, Bagheera, and the wolf pack with Shere Khan's skin. Illustration by W. H. Drake. First edition, 1894

=== Abandonment and fostering ===
Critics such as Harry Ricketts have observed that Kipling returns repeatedly to the theme of the abandoned and fostered child, recalling his own childhood feelings of abandonment. In his view, the enemy, Shere Khan, represents the "malevolent would-be foster-parent" who Mowgli in the end outwits and destroys, just as Kipling as a boy had to face Mrs Holloway in place of his parents. Ricketts writes that in "Mowgli's Brothers", the hero loses his human parents at the outset, and his wolf fosterers at the conclusion; and Mowgli is again rejected at the end of "Tiger! Tiger!", but each time is compensated by "a queue of would-be foster-parents" including the wolves, Baloo, Bagheera and Kaa. In Ricketts's view, the power that Mowgli has over all these characters who compete for his affection is part of the book's appeal to children. The historian of India Philip Mason similarly emphasises the Mowgli myth, where the fostered hero, "the odd man out among wolves and men alike", eventually triumphs over his enemies. Mason notes that both Rikki-Tikki-Tavi and The White Seal do much the same.

=== Law and freedom ===
The novelist Marghanita Laski argued that the purpose of the stories was not to teach about animals but to create human archetypes through the animal characters, with lessons of respect for authority. She noted that Kipling was a friend of the founder of the Scout Movement, Robert Baden-Powell, who based the junior scout "Wolf Cubs" on the stories, and that Kipling admired the movement. Ricketts wrote that Kipling was obsessed by rules, a theme running throughout the stories and named explicitly as "the law of the jungle". Part of this, Ricketts supposed, was Mrs Holloway's evangelicalism, suitably transformed. The rules required obedience and "knowing your place", but also provided social relationships and "freedom to move between different worlds". Sandra Kemp observed that the law may be highly codified, but that the energies are also lawless, embodying the part of human nature which is "floating, irresponsible and self-absorbed". There is a duality between the two worlds of the village and the jungle, but Mowgli, like Mang the bat, can travel between the two.

The novelist and critic Angus Wilson noted that Kipling's law of the jungle was "far from Darwinian", since no attacks were allowed at the water-hole when in drought. (Note: When the water level of the Waingunga comes below the summit of the Peace Rock, "Hathi, the wild elephant, proclaims the Water Truce [...] By the Law of the Jungle it is death to kill at the drinking-places when once the Water Truce has been declared. The reason of this is that drinking comes before eating." (How Fear Came, in The Second Jungle Book (read online)).) In Wilson's view, the popularity of the Mowgli stories is thus not literary but moral: the animals can follow the law easily, but Mowgli has human joys and sorrows, and the burden of making decisions. Kipling's biographer, Charles Carrington, argued that the "fables" about Mowgli illustrate truths directly, as successful fables do, through the character of Mowgli himself; through his "kindly mentors", Bagheera and Baloo; through the repeated failure of the "bully" Shere Khan; through the endless but useless talk of the Bandar-log; and through the law, which makes the jungle "an integrated whole" while enabling Mowgli's brothers to live as the "Free People".

The academic Jan Montefiore commented on the book's balance of law and freedom that "you don't need to invoke Jacqueline Rose on the adult's dream of the child's innocence or Perry Nodelman's theory of children's literature colonising its readers' minds with a double fantasy of the child as both noble savage and embryo good citizen, to see that the Jungle Books .. give their readers a vicarious experience of adventure both as freedom and as service to a just State".

== Reception ==
Sayan Mukherjee, writing for the Book Review Circle, calls The Jungle Book "one of the most enjoyable books of my childhood and even in adulthood, highly informative as to the outlook of the British on their 'native population'".

The academic Jopi Nyman argued in 2001 that the book formed part of the construction of "colonial English national identity" within Kipling's "imperial project". In Nyman's view, nation, race and class are mapped out in the stories, contributing to "an imagining of Englishness" as a site of power and racial superiority. Nyman suggested that The Jungle Book's monkeys and snakes represent "colonial animals" and "racialized Others" within the Indian jungle, whereas the White Seal promotes "'truly English' identities in the nationalist allegory" of that story.

Swati Singh, in his Secret History of the Jungle Book, notes that the tone is like that of Indian folklore, fable-like, and that critics have speculated that the Kipling may have heard similar stories from his Hindu bearer and his Portuguese ayah (nanny) during his childhood in India. Singh observes, too, that Kipling wove "magic and fantasy" into the stories for his daughter Josephine, and that even critics reading Kipling for signs of imperialism could not help admiring the power of his storytelling.

The Jungle Book came to be used as a motivational book by the Cub Scouts, a junior element of the Scouting movement. This use of the book's universe was approved by Kipling at the request of Robert Baden-Powell, founder of the Scouting movement, who had originally asked for the author's permission for the use of the Memory Game from Kim in his scheme to develop the morale and fitness of working-class youths in cities. Akela, the head wolf in The Jungle Book, has become a senior figure in the movement; the name is traditionally adopted by the leader of each Cub Scout pack.

== Adaptations ==
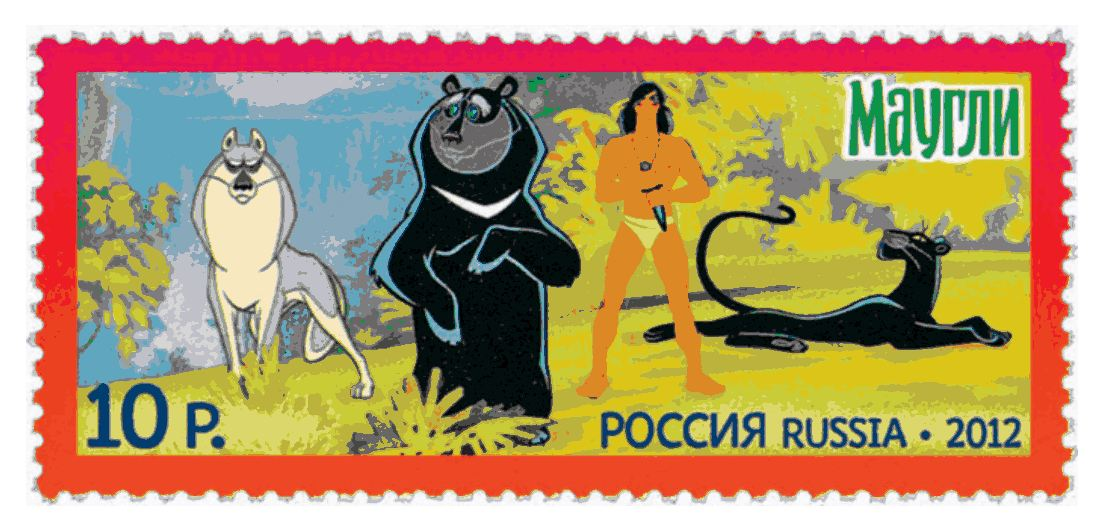
Protagonists from the Soviet animated adaptation, "Маугли" (Mowgli), on a Russian postage stamp.

The Jungle Book has been adapted many times in a wide variety of media. In literature, Robert Heinlein wrote the Hugo Award-winning science fiction novel, Stranger in a Strange Land (1961), when his wife, Virginia, suggested a new version of The Jungle Book, but with a child raised by Martians instead of wolves. Neil Gaiman's The Graveyard Book (2008) is inspired by The Jungle Book. It follows a baby boy who is found and brought up by the dead in a cemetery. It has many scenes that can be traced to Kipling, but with Gaiman's dark twist.

In music, the Jungle Book cycle (1958) was written by the Australian composer Percy Grainger, an avid Kipling reader. It consists of quotations from the book, set as choral pieces and solos for soprano, tenor or baritone. The French composer Charles Koechlin wrote several symphonic works inspired by the book.

BBC Radio broadcast an adaptation on 14 February 1994 and released it as a BBC audiobook in 2008. It was directed by Chris Wallis with Nisha K. Nayar as Mowgli, Eartha Kitt as Kaa, Freddie Jones as Baloo, and Jonathan Hyde as Bagheera. The music was by John Mayer.

The book's text has been adapted for younger readers with comic book adaptations such as DC Comics Elseworlds' story, "Superman: The Feral Man of Steel", in which an infant Superman is raised by wolves, while Bagheera, Akela, and Shere Khan make appearances. Marvel Comics published several adaptations by Mary Jo Duffy and Gil Kane in the pages of Marvel Fanfare (vol. 1). These were collected in the one-shot Marvel Illustrated: The Jungle Book (2007). Bill Willingham's comic book series, Fables, features The Jungle Book's Mowgli, Bagheera, and Shere Khan.

Manga Classics: The Jungle Book was published by UDON Entertainment's Manga Classics imprint in June 2017.

Many films have been based on one or another of Kipling's stories, including Elephant Boy (1937), Chuck Jones's made for-TV cartoons Rikki-Tikki-Tavi (1975), The White Seal (1975), and Mowgli's Brothers (1976). Many films, too, have been made of the book as a whole, such as Zoltán Korda's 1942 film, Disney's 1967 animated film and its 2016 remake. Other adaptations include the Russian adaptation named Mowgli, published as Adventures of Mowgli in the US, an animation released between 1967 and 1971, and combined into a single 96-minute feature film in 1973, and the 1989 Italian-Japanese anime The Jungle Book: Adventures of Mowgli.

Stuart Paterson wrote a stage adaptation in 2004, first produced by the Birmingham Old Rep in 2004 and published in 2007 by Nick Hern Books.

In 2021 BBC Radio 4 broadcast an adaptation by Ayeesha Menon which resets the story as a "gangland coming-of-age fable" in modern India.

== See also ==
- Feral children in mythology and fiction
- Sher Shah Suri
