= Jules Tavernier (painter) =

American painter (1844–1899)

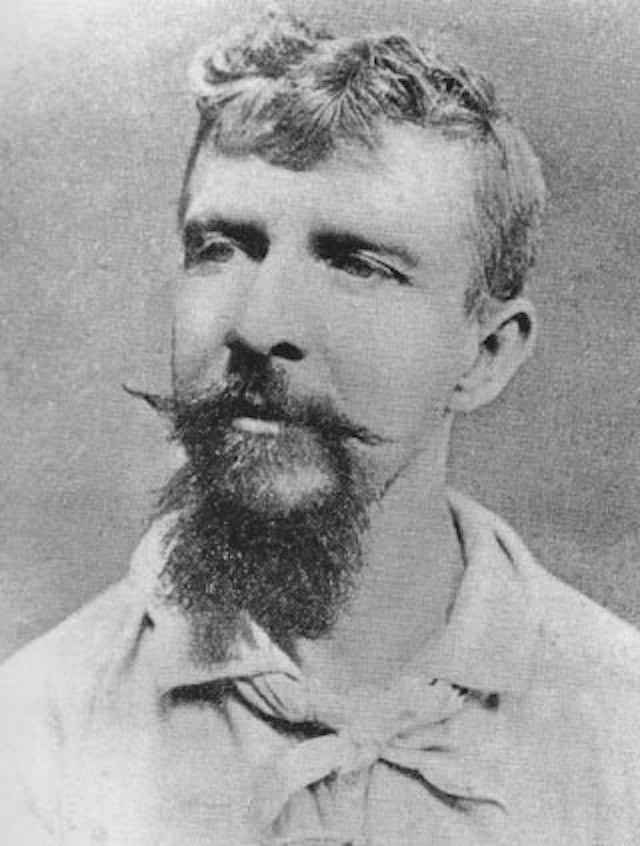
- Undated photo, likely ca. 1877 or later.
- Born: 27 April 1844; Paris, France
- Died: 18 May 1889 (aged 45); Honolulu, Hawaii
- Known for: Painting
- Movement: Volcano School

Jules Wilhelm Tavernier (27 April 1844 – 18 May 1889) was a French-American painter, draftsman, illustrator, and member of Hawaii’s Volcano School.

== Early life ==
=== France ===
Tavernier was born on 27 April 1844 in Paris to John Tavernier, an English confectioner from Plymouth, and his wife whom he married two years prior, Marie-Louise Rosalie Woillaume (born in Paris). Tavernier's parents and siblings would later move to England to join the English side of his family, but he chose to remain in Paris with his French relatives. He studied under French painter Félix-Joseph Barrias from 1861 to 1865, eventually showing five of his paintings at the Salon. After fighting as a soldier in the Franco-Prussian War, Tavernier moved to London in 1871. It is reported that Tavernier briefly worked in London as an illustrator until moving to the United States on August 29, 1871.

== Career ==
=== Harper's ===
In the United States, Tavernier was employed as an illustrator by Harper's Magazine, which sent him, along with Paul Frenzeny, on a year-long coast-to-coast sketching tour in 1873. They created works depicting the American frontier, Native American themes, and western landscapes of forests and pastoral scenes.

=== San Francisco ===
He arrived in San Francisco in the summer of 1874, but soon traveled south and founded an art colony on the Monterey Peninsula. In 1874, Tavernier came upon the tavern owned by his compatriot Jules Simoneau. Briefly, he established a studio at the Girandin Hotel (now called Stevenson House). In November 1875, Tavernier, alongside Walter Paris, leased space on Alvarado Street, establishing the first dedicated artist studio in Monterey. Tavernier met Lizzie Fulton in Monterey in 1876, leading to their marriage in February 1877. The marriage was tumultuous and they often argued about Tavernier's unusual spending habits. She would eventually leave him after a reportedly violent row in Hawaii.

In San Francisco, Tavernier became close friends with Joseph Strong, as both were members of the Bohemian Club. Their two families lived together in 1881 in the old offices of the California Supreme Court in the Montgomery Block, the center of the bohemian movement for artists in San Francisco in the late 19th century. They famously held a party for Oscar Wilde at their Montgomery Block flat during Wilde's famous tour of the city in 1882. Impressed with his hosts, Wilde notably declared, "This is where I belong!" and they all got drunk together.

Tavernier was at odds with the San Francisco Art Association (SFAA); he believed they were working against the interests of local artists. Charles D. Robinson and Tavernier founded the California Palette Club as a protest against the SFAA. In the 1870s and 1880s, the California art market for local artists declined as wealthy collectors like Leland Stanford and others replaced their California works with European painters represented by William-Adolphe Bouguereau, Jean-Léon Gérôme, and Jehan Georges Vibert.

=== Hawaii ===
Tavernier continued westward to Hawaii, where he worked as a landscape painter. He was fascinated by Hawaii’s erupting volcanoes—a subject that was to pre-occupy him for the rest of his life, which was spent in Hawaii, Canada, and the western United States.

== Death ==
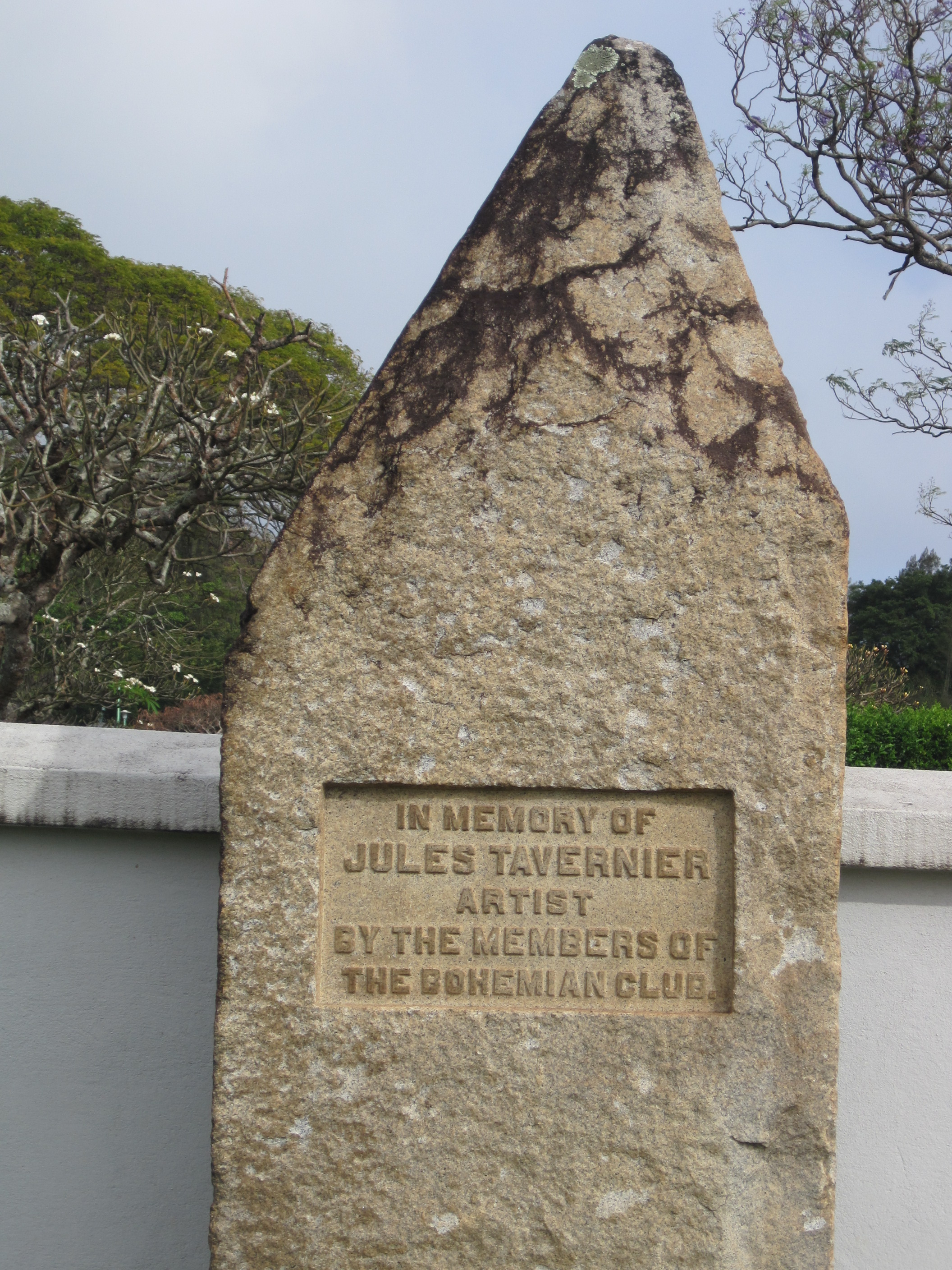
Jules Tavernier memorial, Oahu Cemetery, Honolulu

Tavernier's heavy drinking led his friends to keep their distance in his final months, and his wife eventually left him as his creditors hounded him for money. Tavernier was found dead in his room on May 18, 1889, at the age of 45 in Honolulu, presumably from alcoholism. No autopsy was performed and he was buried in a pauper's grave. Isobel Osbourne, Strong's wife at the time, made a highly unusual claim in her memoirs decades later, leading to much controversy. In her book, Strong matter of factly claimed that Tavernier was found "shot through the heart", but never clarified what she meant. Subsequent writers have dismissed her claim or described it as a literary metaphor, while other sources repeated it without question, thereby spreading the idea that Tavernier committed suicide or was murdered. Tavernier was buried in the Oahu Cemetery. His pall-bearers included his close friends, a Mr. Peacock, a Mr. Wright, Mr. Ollert, and Mr. Strong. Tavernier's friends at the Bohemian Club in San Francisco sent over a larger memorial marker in honor of his life in December 1890. The marker reads "In memory of / Jules Tavernier / Artist".

== Legacy ==
While Tavernier upheld his status as one of the true bohemian painters of the American West, his penchant for attacking the art world, including its most powerful and wealthiest of its patrons, did not help his career. Tavernier's excessive alcoholism, personal issues with friends and families, and the avoidance of paying his creditors, further damaged his career.

Tavernier's bohemian life and death in Hawaii were fictionalized by writer Joseph Theroux in Kilauea (2018), a work of detective fiction that treats Tavernier's death as an unsolved murder.

== Exhibitions ==
Public collections holding paintings by Tavernier include the Brigham Young University Museum of Art (Provo, Utah), Colorado Springs Fine Arts Center (Colorado Springs, Colorado), Crocker Art Museum (Sacramento), Gilcrease Museum (Tulsa, Oklahoma), Hearst Art Gallery (Saint Mary's College of California, Moraga, California), Honolulu Museum of Art, Isaacs Art Center (Kamuela, Hawaii), Museum of Nebraska Art (Kearney, Nebraska), Oakland Museum of California, San Diego Museum of Art, Stark Museum of Art (Orange, Texas), Society of California Pioneers (San Francisco, California), Washington County Museum of Fine Arts (Hagerstown, Maryland), and Yosemite Museum (Yosemite National Park).

In 2014, the Crocker Art Museum in Sacramento, California, held an exhibition of more than 100 works by Tavernier, the first career retrospective of his work, accompanied by a catalog entitled Jules Tavernier: Artist & Adventurer. After the Crocker, the exhibition moved to the Monterey Museum of Art.

From 16 August to 28 November 2021, the Metropolitan Museum of Art held an exhibition, Jules Tavernier and the Elem Pomo, that explored Tavernier's cultural exchange with the Indigenous Pomo community of Elem at Clear Lake in Northern California. The show traveled to the de Young Museum, Fine Arts Museums of San Francisco from 18 December 2021 to 17 April 2022.

== Selected works ==
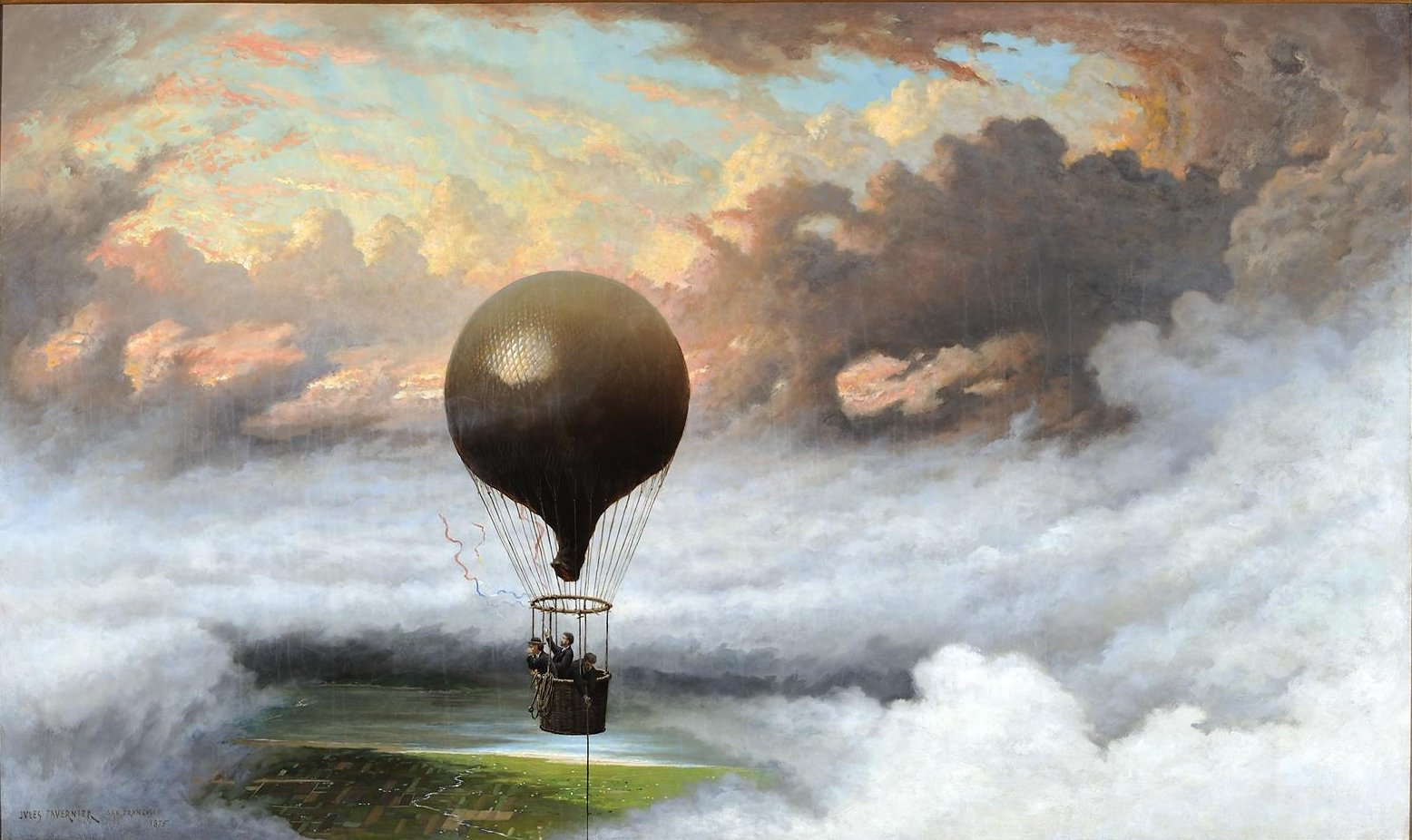
A Balloon in Mid-Air, 1875, oil on canvas, Private collection

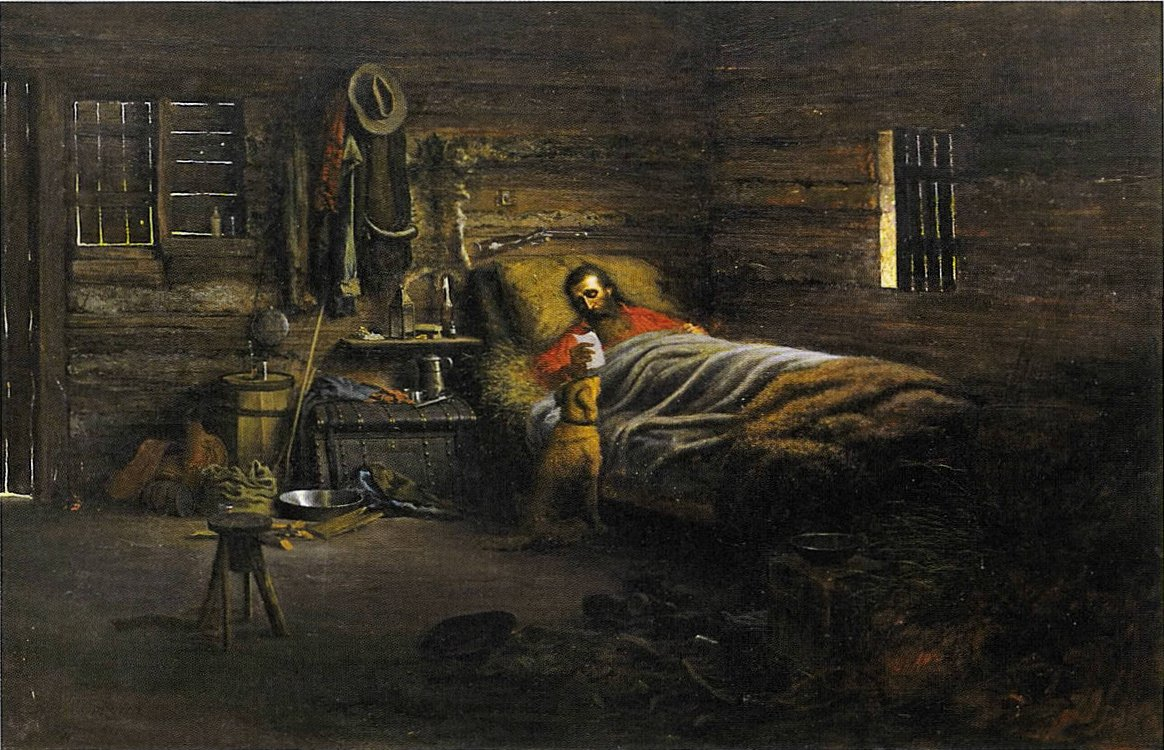
The Pioneer, 1877, oil on canvas, Society of California Pioneers

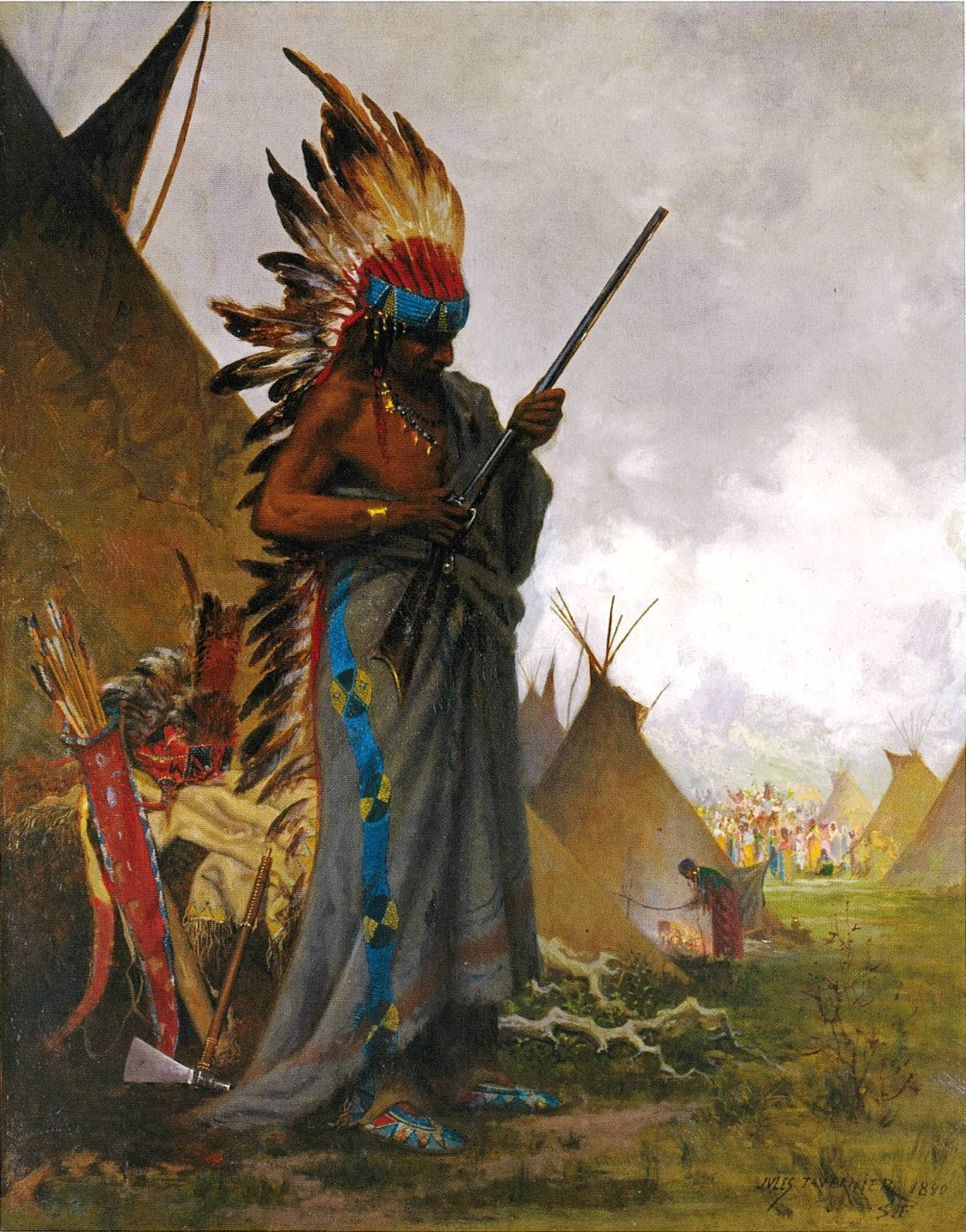
White Man's Weapon, 1880, oil on canvas, Stark Museum of Art, Orange, Texas

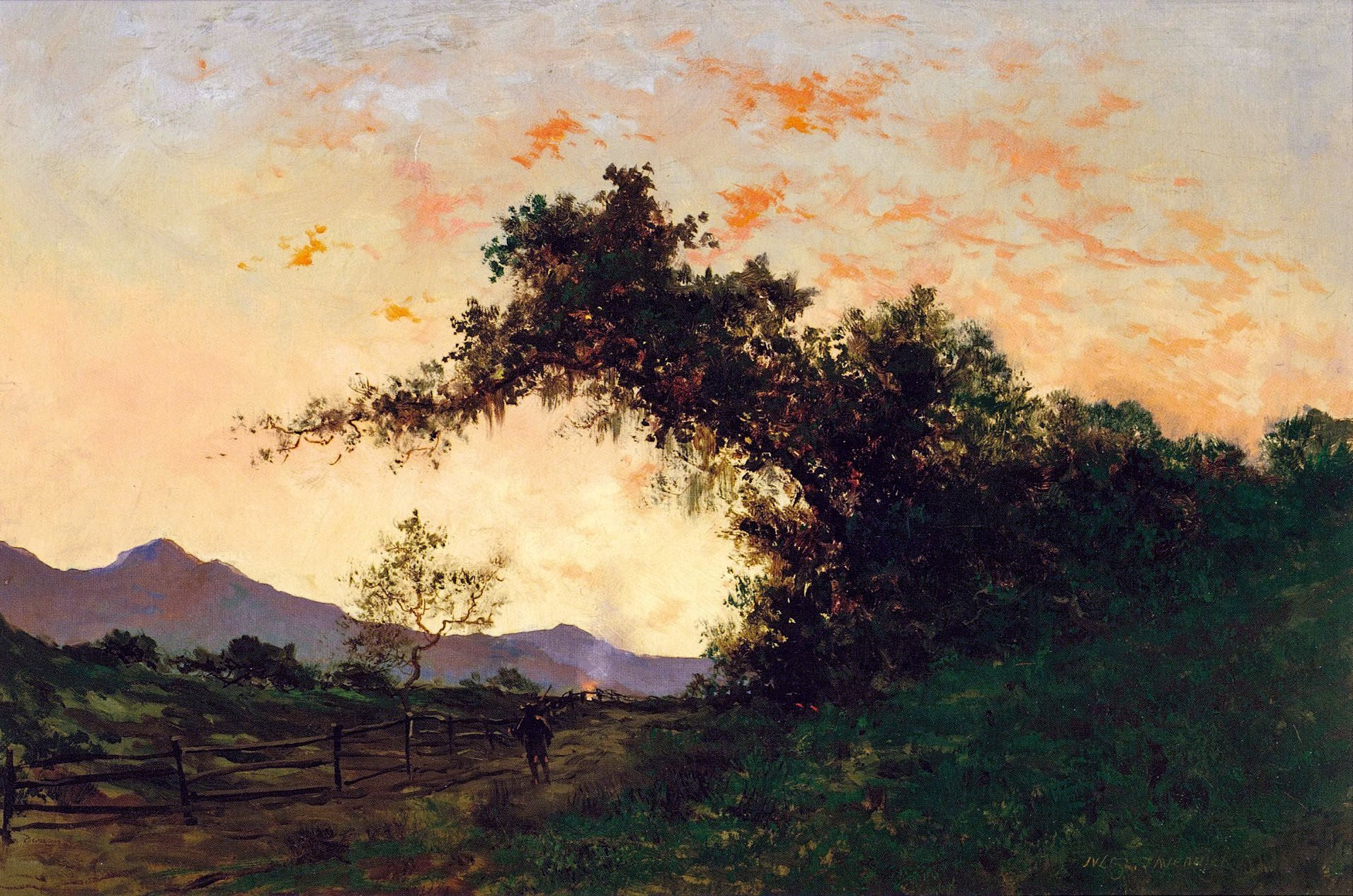
Marin Sunset in Back of Petaluma, early 1880s, oil on canvas, Crocker Art Museum, Sacramento, California

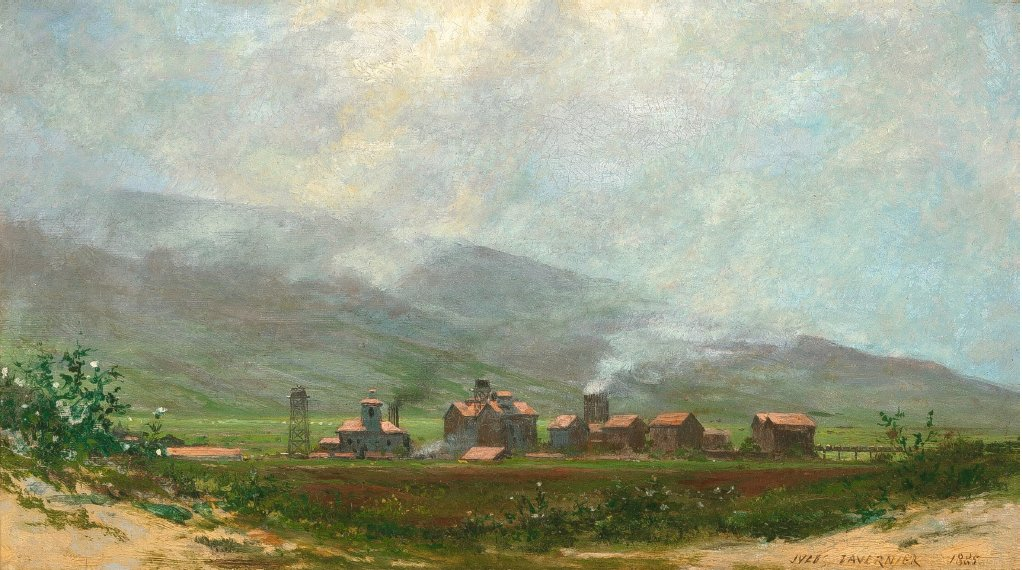
Maui Sugar Plantation, 1885, oil on wood panel

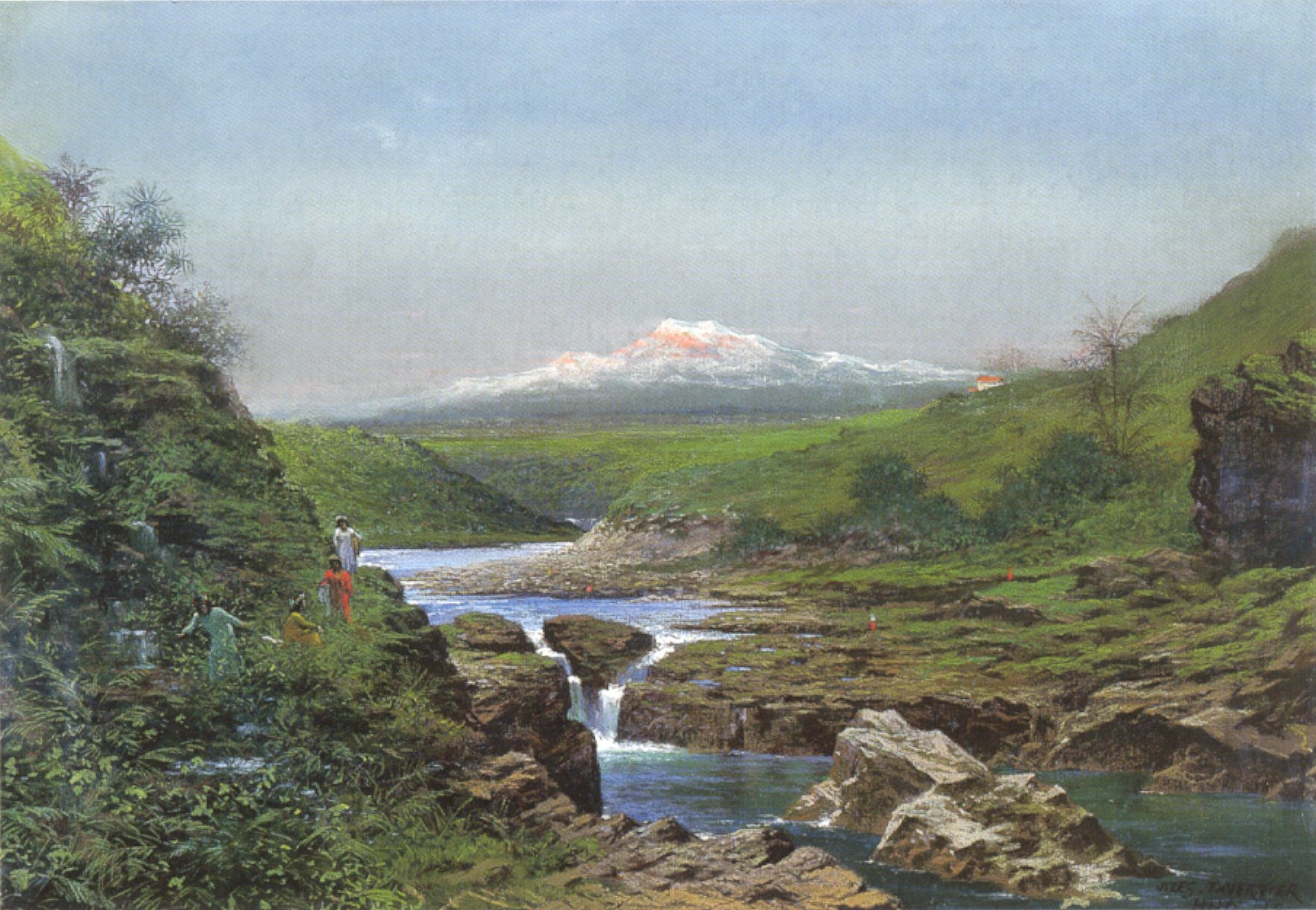
Wailuku Falls, Hilo, c. 1886, pastel on paper, Honolulu Museum of Art

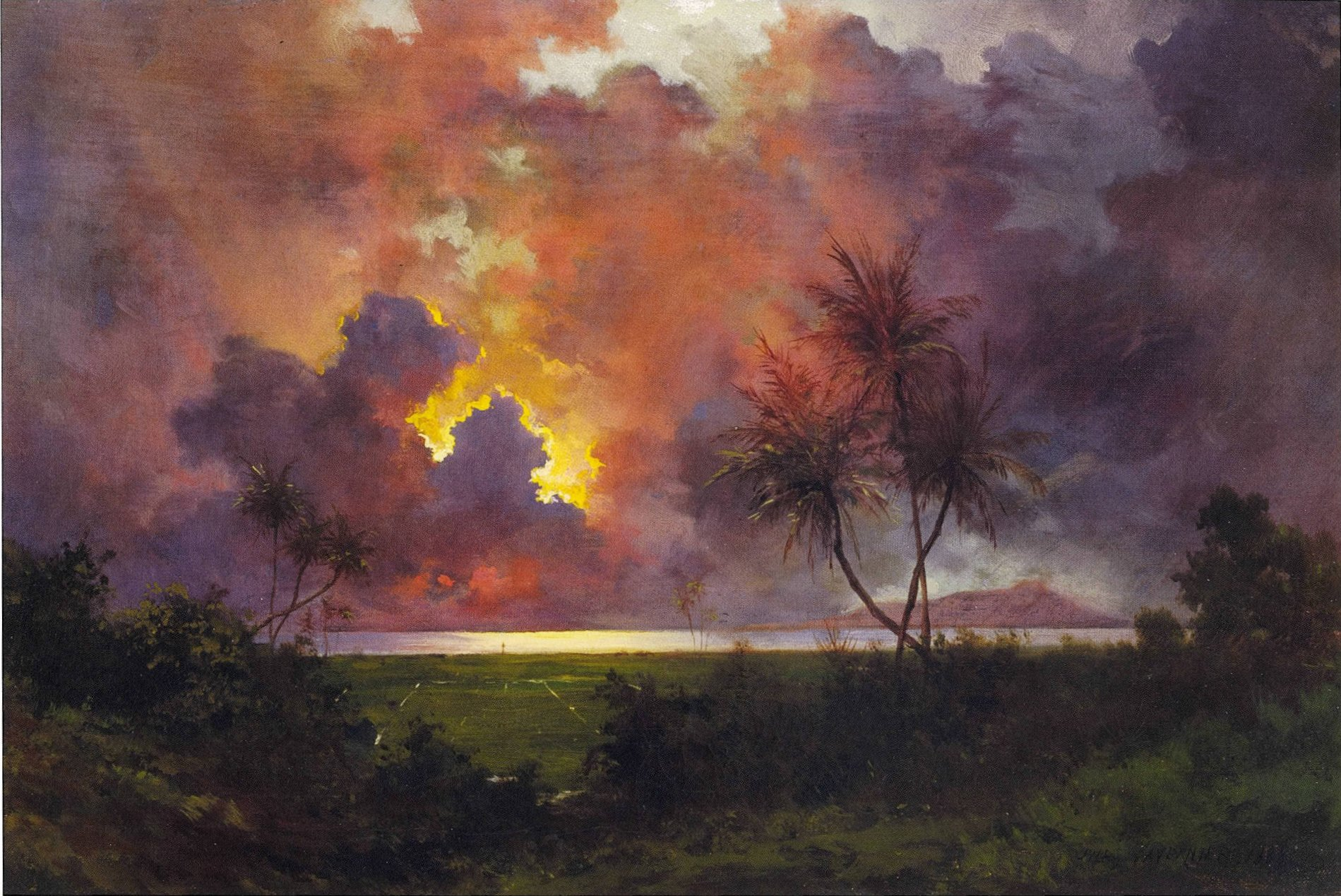
Sunrise Over Diamond Head, 1888, oil on canvas, Honolulu Museum of Art

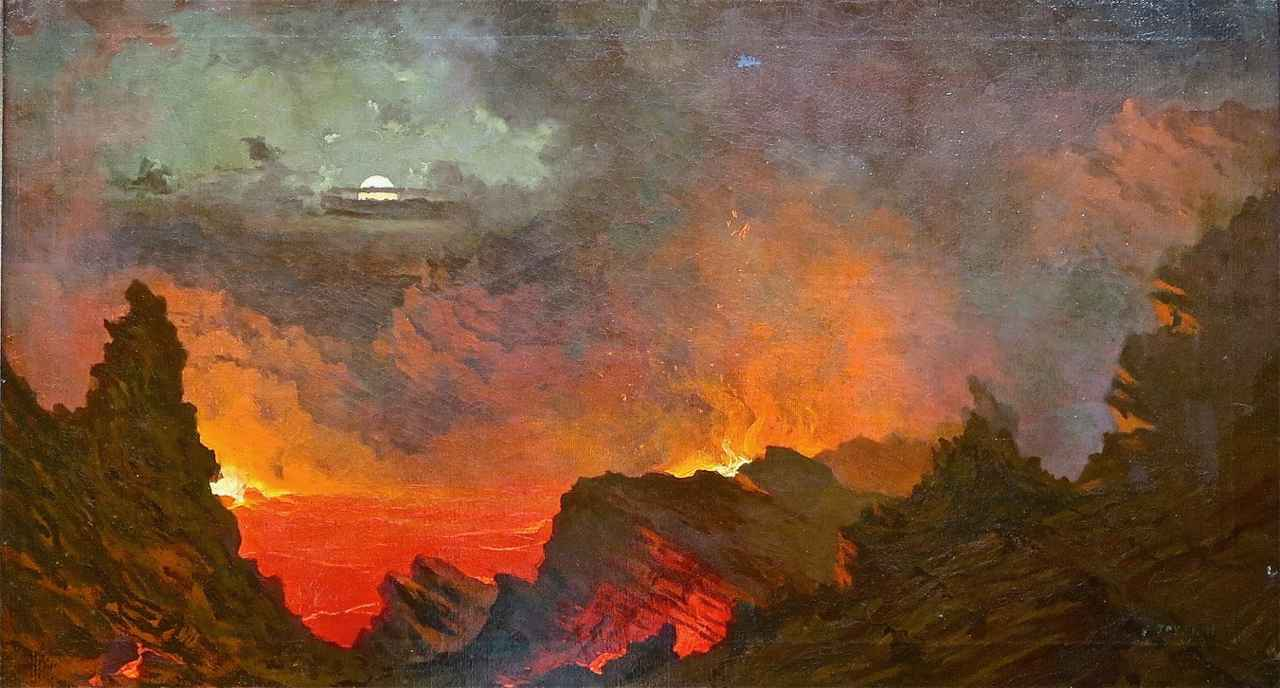
Kilauea by Moonlight, 1889, oil on canvas, Isaacs Art Center

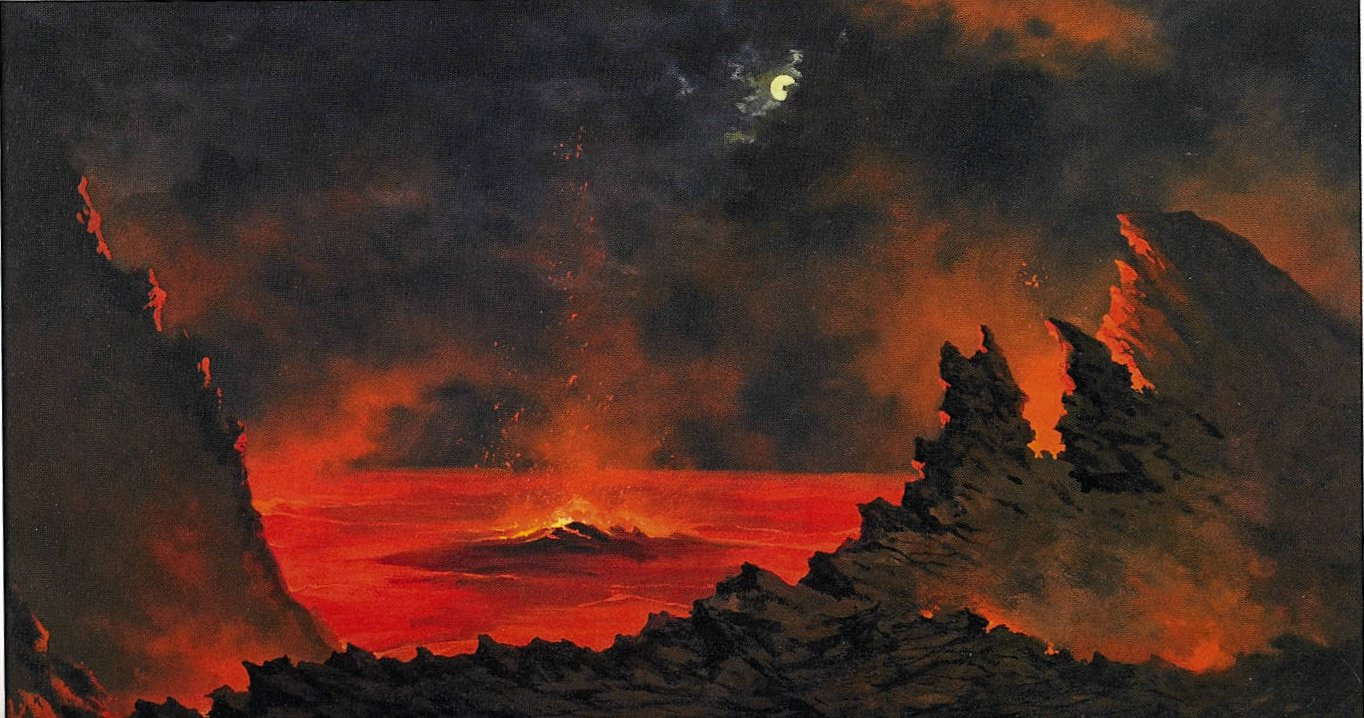
Volcano at Night, late 1880s, oil on canvas, Honolulu Museum of Art

== Sources ==
- Forbes, David W. (1992). Encounters with Paradise: Views of Hawaii and its People, 1778–1941. Honolulu Academy of Arts. pp. 96, 173–174, 179–180, 190–191. ISBN 9780937426166. OCLC 24550242.
- Forbes, David W. (2016). Paintings, Prints, and Drawings of Hawaii from the Sam and Mary Cooke Collection. Mānoa Heritage Center. ISBN 9780692735312. OCLC 992989559.
- Maier, Steven, Jules Tavernier: Hawaiʻi’s First Real Painter, Honolulu, Nov. 1996, 80.
- McGlynn, Betty Hoag, "Jules Tavernier, 1844-1889" in Tanner, Jerre Hawaii Island Artists and Friends of the Arts, premiere ed., Malama Arts Inc., Kailua-Kona, Hawaii, 1989, ISBN 0931909066, pp. 13–19
