= Henri Lucien Doucet =

French painter (1856–1895)

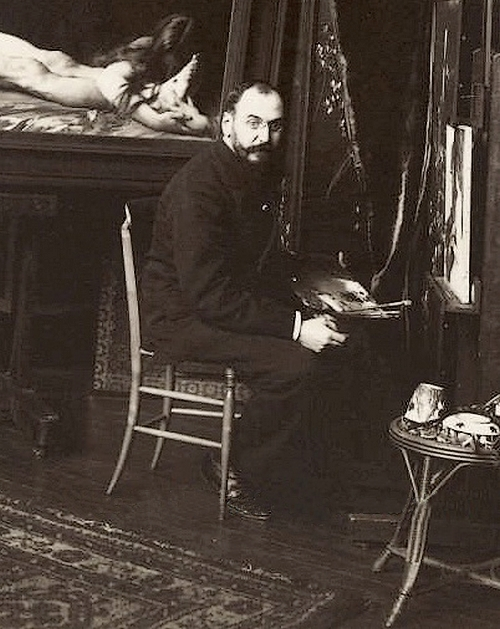
Doucet in his studio (1890)

Henri Lucien Doucet (French pronunciation: [ɑ̃ʁi lysjɛ̃ dusɛ]; 23 August 1856 – 31 December 1895) was a 19th-century French figure and portrait painter and pastellist.

== Biography ==
Born in Paris, Doucet studied under Lefebvre and Boulanger, and in 1880 won the Prix de Rome. In 1888, he taught at Académie Julian His pictures are usually piquant, sparkling representations of modern life, eminently Parisian in style, but the audacious realism of his earlier work is not maintained in his later, which is somewhat characterless. His portraits in pastel are also notable.

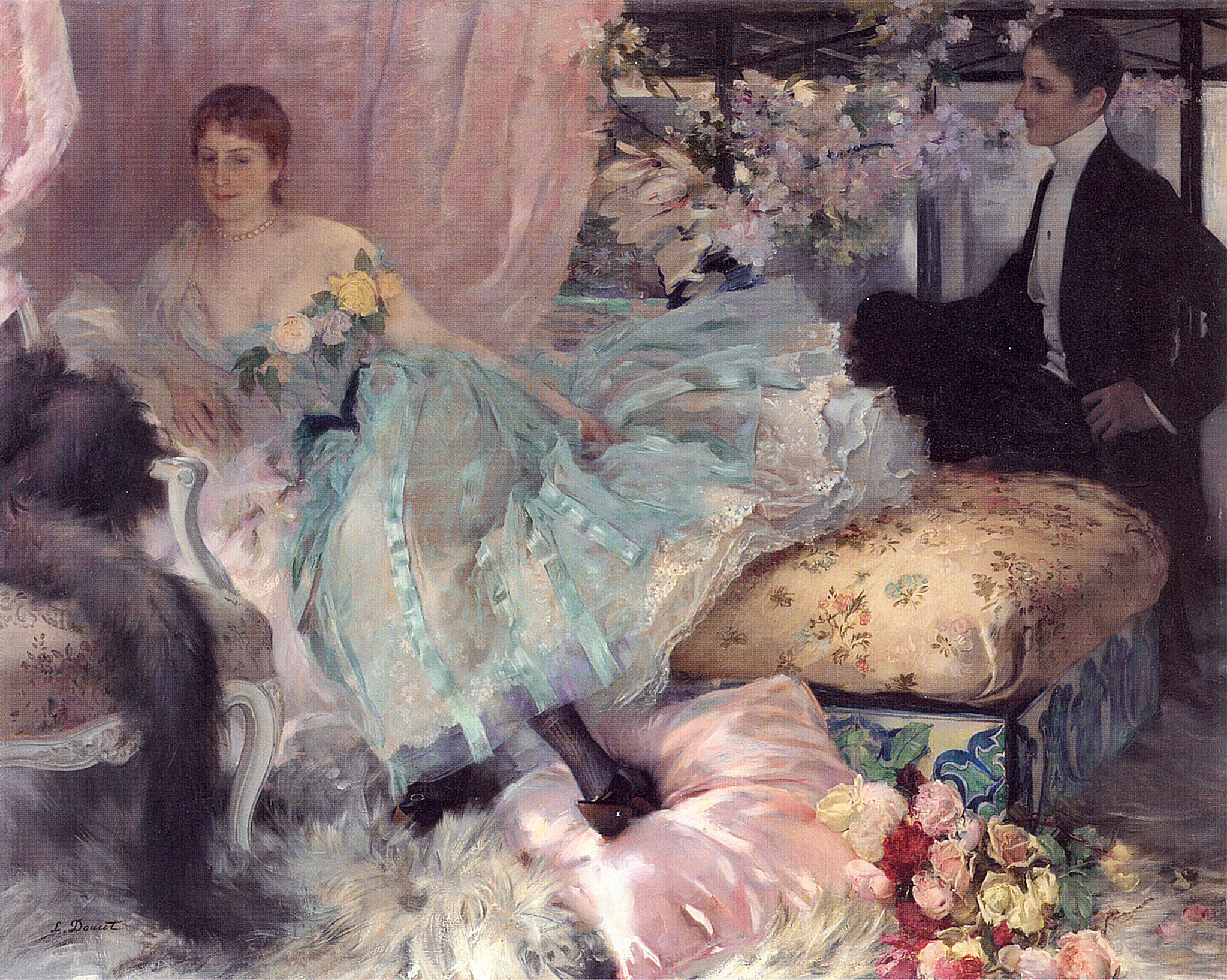
After the Ball

His most widely known picture is Après le bal (After the Ball, 1889). Other excellent examples are the portraits of Celestine Galli-Marie as Carmen (1884, Marseille Museum), La princesse Mathilde Laetitia Wilhelmine Bonaparte and My Parents (1890, Lyons Museum), A Spanish Woman (Pontoise Museum), and Nude Figure (1890). He was awarded a first-class medal for pastel in 1889 and the Legion of Honour in 1891.

His painting A Skating Party, of 1893, was exhibited at the Chicago World Fair or the World's Columbian Exposition, which was held from May to October 1893 in Chicago in honour of the 400th anniversary of Columbus' discovery of the New World. Goupil made a limited edition first impression photogravure of the painting.

== Pupils ==
Doucet's students included:

- Jules Benoit-Lévy
- William Henry Drake (1856–1926), American painter and illustrator
- Charles Atherton Cumming (1858–1932), American painter
