= William Henry Drake (painter) =

American painter and illustrator (1856–1926)

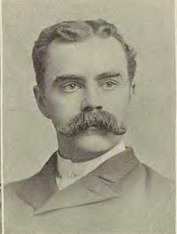
- Born: June 4, 1856; New York, NY
- Died: January 23, 1926; Los Angeles, CA
- Education: McMicken School of Design, Académie Julian, Art Students League of New York
- Known for: Painting, illustration
- Awards: National Academy

William Henry Drake (June 4, 1856 – January 23, 1926) born in New York, was an American painter and illustrator known for his illustrations of The Jungle Book by Rudyard Kipling.

== Biography ==
Although born in New York City, Drake considered Cincinnati his home, having moved there at the age of six. His artistic passion emerged early, leading him to study at the McMicken School of Design. His fascination with animals, particularly lions, began to take shape there. He left Cincinnati for New York in 1882.

In 1887 and 1889 Drake went to Europe and studied at the Académie Julian in Paris, with Jean-Joseph Benjamin-Constant and Henri Lucien Doucet.

Back from Europe, he studied at the Cincinnati School of Design, and would often go to the zoo, where he could draw the animals. He was then employed by the Museum of Natural History. He continued to study at the Art Students League of New York. In 1878 he worked as a freelance pen-and-ink artist for such periodicals as Century or Harper’s with animal studies, still lifes and landscapes.

Having developed skills in drawing wild animals, particularly wild cats, in 1894, he received commissions to illustrate books, including The Jungle Books, by Kipling. In 1902 he was made an associate member of the National Academy of Design. Drake moved to California in 1920.

On January 23, 1926, Drake reportedly took his own life by locking himself in the closet of his studio along with illuminating gas.
