= Jules Benoit-Lévy =

French painter (1866–1952)

Jules Benoit-Levy
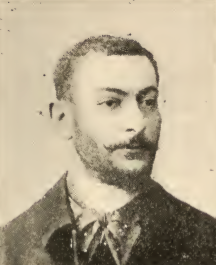
- Jules Benoit-Lévy, 1896
- Born: 27 February 1866; Paris, France
- Died: 14 March 1952 (aged 86); Nogent-sur-Marne, France
- Education: École nationale supérieure des Beaux-Arts; Gustave Boulanger; Henri-Lucien Doucet; Jules Lefebvre
- Known for: Painter
- Movement: Realism and Impressionism
- Awards: Officier de l'Instruction Publique (Golden Palms)

Jules Benoit-Lévy (27 February 1866 – 14 March 1952) was a French painter and printmaker.

== Biography ==
Benoit-Lévy was born in Paris. He was the son of Baruch Benoit-Lévy (1821–1884) and Julie Strasburger (1826–1901). At the Paris School of Decorative Arts, he studied under Gustave Boulanger and Henri Lucien Doucet, then entered the Jules Joseph Lefebvre workshop at the School of Fine Arts in Paris.

A history and sea painter, he also worked on genre paintings featuring cardinals in anecdotal everyday situations, a theme in vogue at the time.

Benoit-Lévy exhibited his paintings at the Petite Gelerie Drouot, 23 rue Drouot in Paris.

After trying himself in various genres, Jules Benoit-Levy went to the Netherlands, and stayed at the island of Marken. He created fifty paintings that show sensitive and specific nature of these places.

More than his finished paintings, which resulted from great effort, his sketches show precise observation of atmosphere—sometimes characterized by clear, brightened colours, green or orange; sometimes grey and veiled in mist. In 1902 he exhibited in Paris fifty paintings he made during a stay in the Netherlands, on the theme of everyday life and typical interiors.

Benoit-Lévy exhibited his paintings at the Salon des Artistes Français in Paris and received a third medal in 1895, honorable mention in 1901, and a third class medal in 1911.

In 1911 and 1912, Benoit-Lévy exhibited in Monte-Carlo in Palais des Beaux-Arts at the Exposition Internationale.

From 1911 to 1930, he exhibited at the Salon D'Hiver in Grand Palais.

He was awarded the Golden Ordre des Palmes Académiques (Officier de l'Instruction Publique).

Benoit-Lévy died in Nogent-sur-Marne on 14 March 1952.

== Works ==
- The soup of the squad; at the manceuvers
- Combat a Tinténiac, près Rennes, 1793
- Examination of the Prince of T.
- La Défense de Rambervillers (Vosges) en 1870
- Sentry reposing, 1793
- La Bretagne
- The arrest of Condorcet
- 14 th July 1789. En route to take the Bastille
- Death of General Moulin; Cholet, 1794
- Dutch Home
- Het Breistertje
- Dutch Home
- Evening; - near Amsterdam
- Good Hope Inn (Holland)
- Evening chat. (Holland)
- Intérieur
- Causerie du soir
- Paneakes at Pont-Croix
- The old chaps (Holland)
- On the dyke (Holland)

== Notes ==
- Bénézit, p. 631.
