= Paul Frenzeny =

American artist and illustrator

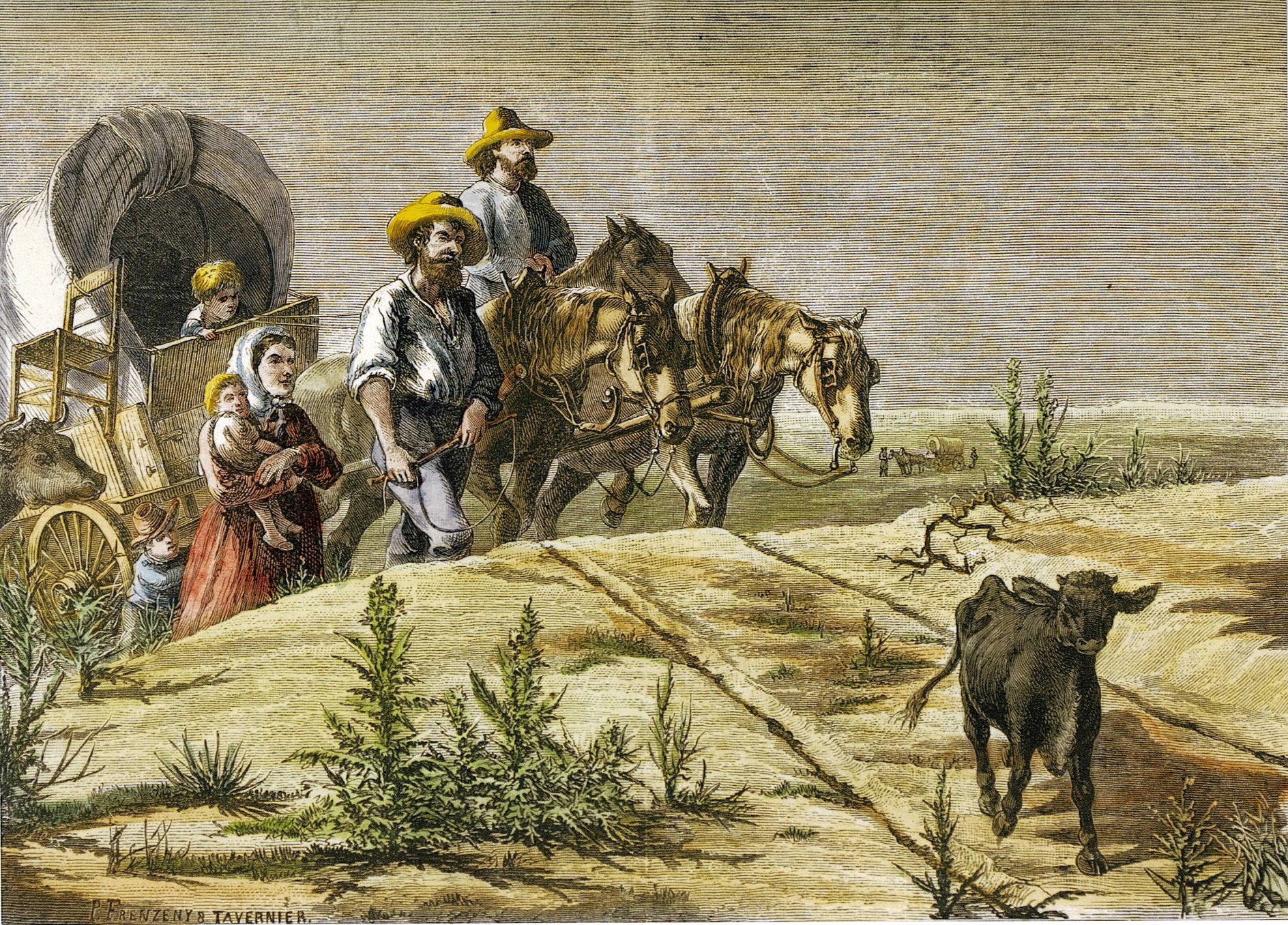
Sketches from the Far West-Arkansas Pilgrims by Paul Frenzeny and Jules Tavernier, 1874

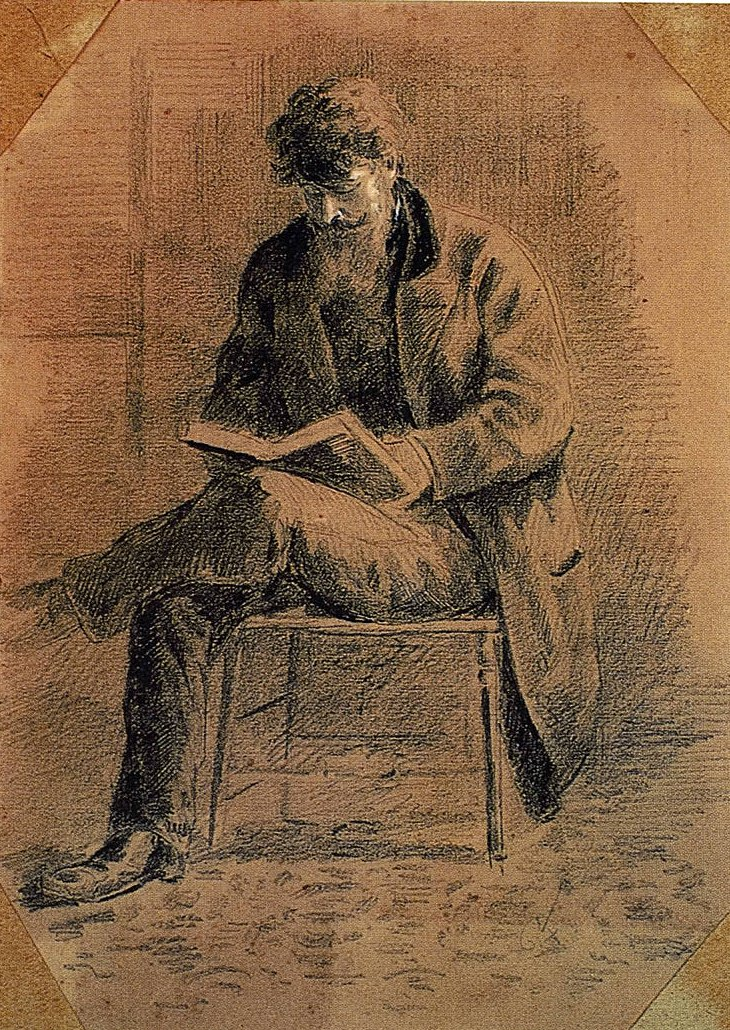
Undated portrait of Jules Tavernier by Paul Frenzeny

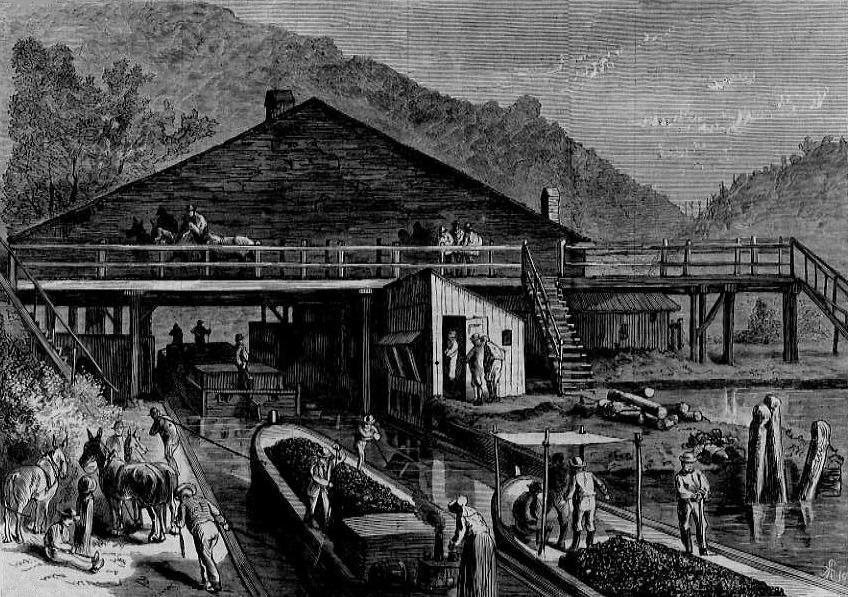
Weighing the Cargoes in the Weigh Lock on the Lehigh Canal, Pennsylvania, Harper's Weekly, 1873

Paul Frenzeny (1840s – 1902) was an American artist and illustrator. He is known for the many illustrations he made as he travelled across America for Harper's Weekly with the artist Jules Tavernier.

== Life ==
Paul Frenzeny was born in the 1840s, probably in France, although no records of his birth have yet been found. He was an artillery officer in Maximilian's French army in Mexico. After Maximilian's execution in 1867, Frenzeny left the army and took art lessons in New York. He and Jules Tavernier were commissioned by the Illustrated American magazine Harper's Weekly to Travel from the East Coast to the West Coast to capture illustrations of the as yet unsettled West, starting in 1873 and reaching San Francisco in 1874 when they became early and active members of the Bohemian Club. When Jules Tavernier returned to painting full time, Paul Frenzeny continued sketching for Harper's Weekly and many other publications like Frank Leslie's Illustrated Newspaper. He became interested in San Francisco's Chinatown and drew many illustrations of that quarter between 1874 and 1882. After spending some time on the East Coast where he went on sketching, Frenzeny returned to London aboard the ship State of Nebraska as one of Buffalo Bill's Wild West riders. He subsequently gained considerable fame as a book illustrator for such masterpieces as Tolstoy's Anna Karenina and Kipling's Jungle Book. His career as a special correspondent continued until his death in London in 1906. Always respectful of the authenticity of his observations and sketches, Frenzeny is considered one of the most prolific and accurate special correspondents of his time. His travels spanned the globe from the Yukon through Siberia to China, to Mexico and Guatemala, and throughout the United States, England and France.
