= Jayshree =

Jayshree is an Indian female given name and may refer to:

- Jayshree Arora, Indian actress, dancer
- Jayshree Gadkar, Indian Marathi and Hindi film actress
- Jayshree Jadeja, Indian cricketer
- Jayshri Jadhav, Indian politician
- Jayshree Khadilkar, Indian chess player
- Jayshree Satpute, Indian lawyer and human rights activist
- Jayshree Soni, Indian actress
- Jayshree T., Indian Marathi actress and dancer
- Jayshree Talwalkar, Indian philosopher, spiritual leader, social reformer
- Jayshree Ullal, American businesswoman

== See also ==
- Jaya (disambiguation)
- Shree (disambiguation)
- Jayashree, alternative form of the name
  - Jayashree (Tamil actress), Indian actress
- Jayasri Burman, Indian artist
- Jayasri Chattopadhyay, Indian Sanskrit writer and poet
- Jayasree Kalathil, Indian writer, translator, mental health researcher and activist
- Joyasree Goswami Mahanta, Indian politician
- Jaysri-Jeyaraaj, Indian musical duo
- Jayshree Periwal High School, Jaipur, Rajasthan, India
