= Imandar Daurey =

Nepalese story

Imandar Daurey (English: Honest Woodcutter) is a Nepalese story. The basic moral of the story is "don't lie and don't be greedy". The story has been animated and shown as part of social awareness campaigns.

== History ==
Imandar Daurey may have been created around the 1990s or the 2000s but its popularity began to grow in the 2000s. It is an adaptation of an older story, Panchatantra, which is about a woodcutter who is rewarded by a goddess for his honesty.

== Summary ==
Imandar Daurey is a story about a poor man named Daurey who makes a living by cutting down trees and selling firewood. One day, while in the middle of the jungle, he saw a giant log in the ground. Daurey tries to cut down the log, but he loses his axe in the pond. He then starts to cry, complaining about how unlucky his day was. While he is weeping, a jalpari (mermaid) appears from the pond, offering to help him find his axe. She goes down into the pond then proceeds to offer him a gold axe, asking if it is his axe. Daurey responds, stating that it is not his axe. She then offers him a silver axe, and Daurey responds as before. Finally, she offers him his axe. Daurey tells her that it is his axe, and then thanks her for it. The jalpari is impressed by his honesty, rewarding him with a gold and a silver axe that he sells to buy a good house.

His neighbor, curious as to how he had managed to buy the house, asks him about it. Daurey tells him what had happened, causing his neighbor to see a way to easily make money. The next day he does the same thing as Daurey. The jalpari appears, offering him a silver axe, and he says it is not his axe. She then offers him a gold axe, which he claims is his. The jalpari, seeing his lie, becomes angered and refuses to help him.
