= Jayasri Chattopadhyay =

Indian writer and poet

- Born: 1945 (age 80–81)

Academic background
- Thesis: A Critical study of the lyrical elements in the Ramayana of Valmiki

Jayasri Chattopadhyay (Jayaśrī Caṭṭopādhyāya) (b. 1945) is a Sanskrit writer and Sanskrit poet from Kolkata, West Bengal, India. Her Ph.D. was on 'Lyrical Elements of the Ramayana of Valmiki' and D.lit on 'The Influence of Buddhist Avadana Literature on the literature of visvakabi Rabindranath Tagore'.

Her collection of self-composed Sanskrit poems is named Nissangah Pranyayh. The English version of this book is titled Love without attachment. She has done a CD on Nissangah Pranayah which was released at the 16th World Sanskrit Conference held in Bangkok, June 2015. Her notable Sanskrit writings are 'Asafvilasa Samiksha', 'Sanskrita Sahitye Swapna', 'Mahavastuni Ramayananubhava', 'Adhyardhasataka Samiksha', ' Mricchakatike Varsha', 'Buddhacharite Ramayana samyam', 'Jagannathasya', 'Jagadabharanam', 'Sahitye smrityaloka', 'Usha Varavarnini', and 'Devi Suktam' which were published in different Sanskrit journals.

She also edited and translated in Bengali 'Kakolukiyam' and 'Labdhapranasham', two tantras of the panchatantra. Besides Nissangah Pranayah, she also composed Sanskrit poems like 'Ratri', 'Shilabhattarika', 'Avasara', and 'Kalikatanagarya durgapratimang prati', the English translation of which she recited at the Abhivyakti performance of Sahitya Academy held at Dibrugarh on 5 September 2015.

She was a reader at Women's Christian College, Kolkata and also taught master of Theology at the Bishop's College.

She was also a guest lecturer in Sanskrit College, Kolkata. She received Shastra Churamani Scholarship of Rashtriya Sanskrit Sangsthan and taught in Sitaram Baidic Adarsha Sanskrit Mahabidyalay.

She also taught Alamkarashastra (poetics) at the Jadavpur University Kolkata and wrote history of Sanskrit poetics in Bengali language named 'Alamkarasahityer Samriddha Itihash', published by Sanskrit Pustak Bhandar.

Recently her travel experiences have been published in the Bengali Book Bhraman Vilasir Diary.

== Books ==
- Valmikiye Ramayane Gitikavyadharmita
- Nissanghah pranayah
- Valmikiyam Ramayanam
- Avadan Evam Rabindranath
- Buddha Charitam
- Alamkarasahityer Samriddha Itihash
- Dhwanyaloka
