= Jayashri =

Jayashri is an Indian given name and surname. Notable people with the name include:

- Bombay Jayashri, Indian musician
- Jayashri Raiji (1895–1985), Indian independence activist, social worker, reformist, and politician

== See also ==
- Jayashree
