= Calila e Dimna =

1251 Old Castilian collection of tales

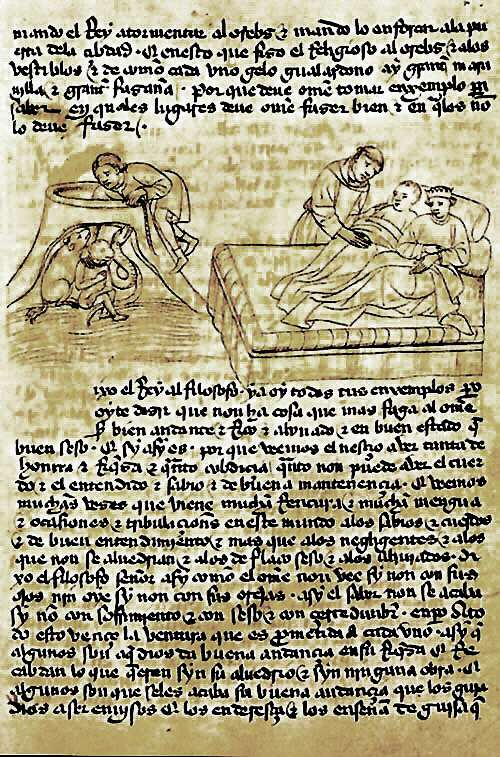
Calila e Dimna manuscript, Madrid, Escorial Library, MS. h-III-9

Calila e Dimna is an Old Castilian collection of tales from 1251, translated from the Arabic text Kalila wa-Dimna by the order of the future King Alfonso X while he was still a prince. The Arabic text is itself an 8th-century translation by Ibn al-Muqaffa' of a Middle Persian version of the Sanskrit Panchatantra from about 2nd-century BCE.

It is linked with the wisdom manuals of prince's education through the eastern method of questions and answers between the king and a philosopher that leads to exemplary tales or exempla told by and featuring animals: an ox, a lion and two jackals called Calila and Dimna, which are who tell the majority of the tales. This structure is used in Don Juan Manuel's Tales of Count Lucanor.

== Authorship ==
This story has arrived to us through two manuscripts named as A and B. In the last part of the first one (from the first third of the 15th century) it is said that the book "was translated from Arabic to Latin, later it was Romanised by order of don Alfonso in 1261". However, as the Spanish version is very near the Arabic one, a translation to Latin can be discarded. The fact that Alfonso is called "infante" (he was crowned in 1252) leads to set the date of composition in 1251 what would convert the book into the first prose-fiction work written in the Iberian Peninsula.

== Structure ==
The main structure of the work is the narrative frame (the conversation between the king Dabshalem and the alguacil-philosopher Burduben). It has three parts clearly differentiated:

- The introduction by Al-Muqaffa, an apology of knowledge and its practice nature.
- Bercebuey's story (two chapters):
  - His trip to India searching for knowledge.
  - Contemptu mundi.
- Calila e Dimna's story. In it we can distinguish two parts:
  - From chapter III to VI, the nearest part to Panchatantra.
  - Other, which encompasses the rest of the chapters and that follows simple organisative schemes and with Oriental parallelisms.

== Summary ==
The King Dabschelim is visited by the philosopher Bidpai who tells him a collection of stories with important morals for a King. The stories are in response to requests of parables from Dabschelim and they follow a Russian doll format, with stories interwoven within the stories.

Story One - The person who infiltrates a friendship to break it up and its consequences

Main Story - The Lion and the Ox

The Ox, Shatrabah, was abandoned by his master due to being stuck in a mud pit and was left to be watched by a servant. However, the servant grew tired of waiting and also abandoned Shatrabah and told his master that the ox had died. Nevertheless, Shatrabah managed to free himself and make his way to a lush pasture where he lived in peace. But the solitude took its toll on Shatrabah and he would moo loudly in despair and loneliness. The sounds of his wails reached the ears of the lion king who ruled the area.

The lion had a court of many animals and predators but had never heard the wailing of an ox. From the lion's court were two doormen jackals, the brothers Kalila and Dimnah. Dimnah was an ambitious jackal and wanted to earn the favour of the king and become his most trusted member of the court. Kalila tried to dissuade Dimnah of his plans but was rebuffed by Dimnah's ambition. Dimnah managed to gain entry into the court with his silvertongue, which impressed the lion king and so, he rose rapidly in rank and quickly became the lion's closest advisor.

Upon hearing the wails of Shatrabah, the lion became anxious and wary of venturing outside, as his scouts had reported on the marvellous beast, with its huge horns and menacing frame (as Shatrabah had put on weight while grazing in the lush meadow), who was the source of the noise. Dimnah was concerned with the king's abandonment of his daily patrol and duties, so he approached the king and calmed him down. Dimnah then went and confronted Shatrabah and painted the picture of the fierce lion king and his court of predators to the ox. Shatrabah was in awe and fear of the king described to him and obeyed Dimnah's claim of a summons from the king and went back with Dimnah.

However, on arrival the ox and the lion struck up a friendship and as days passed, their bond grew and Shatrabah took Dimnah's place as the main confidant of the king. As the days passed, a fierce jealousy consumed Dimnah and he became set on taking down Shatrabah. He confided in his brother Kalila, who warned him against his plans but to no avail. Dimnah first approached the lion and told him that Shatrabah was plotting against him and was planning to usurp the power for himself. The king was skeptical of Dimnah's claims of treason, due to his knowledge of the meek nature of his ox friend. But Dimnah persisted and convinced the lion of Shatrabah's planned treachery and Dimnah advised the lion that the only way to resolve the treason was to punish the ox by death.

The lion decided to confront Shatrabah about these plans and then exile him. Dimnah, knowing the plan would be unravelled if they were allowed to talk, told the lion that if Shatrabah's limbs were trembling and if he was moving his horns as if preparing to charge, then there was no doubt regarding his treason. Dimnah then quickly went to Shatrabah and told him of the lion's plan to kill him and feast on his flesh with his court. But Shatrabah was skeptical of Dimnah's claims as he knew of no crime that he had committed which could have resulted in such a punishment. But he was convinced that the evil members of the lion's court had turned the king against him and that only Dimnah stood by his side. Shatrabah reasoned that the lion's carnivorous nature had won out and that a herbivore like himself had held no place in such a court in the first place. Spurred by Dimnah's whisperings, Shatrabah prepared himself to engage the lion in combat to save his life. Dimnah told the ox that if the lion approaches you with his chest out and mouth open, then know he has come to kill you. Dimnah then went to his brother and told him of his near success before scampering off to witness the showdown.

When the lion confronted the ox, they each saw the other exactly as Dimnah had described and so launched themselves at each other. Shatrabah was killed and the lion was left heavily wounded. Kalila severely scolded his brother for his actions and warned him of the fatal consequences of his deception if he was to be uncovered. The lion king while licking his wounds regretted killing his friend Shatrabah and started to become suspicious of Dimnah.

Meanwhile, a leopard from amongst the closest members of the king's court was prowling in the dark, when he came upon Kalila admonishing Dimnah for his deception and he overheard the whole thing. The leopard immediately went to the lion's mother and upon swearing her to secrecy told her of Dimnah's dastardly scheme. The mother visited her son the next day and saw how his remorse was eating him up and she scolded him for acting without proper investigation. While she was there Dimnah paid a visit to the king and got in a spat with the lion's mother who accused him of treachery and scheming against the king. Dimnah attempted to save the situation with his eloquence but only managed to get thrown into prison.

While in prison, he was visited by his brother Kalila who reminded him of his earlier warnings to not carry out his plot. However, unbeknown to them both a cheetah lay imprisoned with Dimnah, and he overheard the whole confession and was willing to testify against Dimnah in the judge's court. When the court case came, the judge asked for witnesses and warned them all of the punishment in the hereafter if they hid their testimony. The leader of the pigs tried to defame Dimnah, but Dimnah skilfully talked his way out and managed to avoid any further scandal.

During Dimnah's spell in prison, Kalila fell ill out of grief and guilt and died. A fellow jackal Rawzbah visited Dimnah in prison and informed him of his brother's passing, to which Dimnah was very bereaved. The lion pressured his mother into revealing the source of her information regarding Dimnah's plan. She summoned the leopard who testified against Dimnah, as did the imprisoned cheetah, which was enough for the judge to pass the death sentence. And so Dimnah was mercilessly executed.

Sub-story One - The Man and the Wolf - Told by the master to his servant upon learning of the ox's “demise”.

A man was travelling in the wild when he saw a threatening wolf, so in order to escape he ran but came to a ravine with a river preventing safe passage to the village on the other side. Faced with death at the hands of the wolf, the man took his chances and jumped in the river in an attempt to swim across. The current was too strong, and he was being pulled away, when a group of villagers saw him and came to his aid. After being saved and taken to the village he decided to rest for a while in an empty hut on the outskirts of the village, however to his surprise he entered upon a group of bandits distributing their loot. In fear of his life, he quickly took off and ran into an alley where he leant against a wall to catch his breath. The wall then fell on him and he died.

Sub-story two - The Monkey and the Carpenter - Told by Kalila to Dimnah to discourage him from his plans to get involved with the royal court.

A carpenter had a pet monkey who watched him work all day. The monkey dreamed of using the hammer and pegs of the carpenter, and so one day when the carpenter went for a break, he seized the opportunity. The monkey grabbed the hammer and went to hammer a peg into the piece of wood, but unwittingly his tail had got caught in the gap without him noticing, so when the hammer came down the peg was driven into the monkey's tail, and he fell unconscious from the pain. However, when the carpenter returned to find the monkey's handiwork, the monkey became victim of an even more painful punishment for his foolishness.

Sub-story three and four are part of the main story

Sub-story five - The crow and the serpent - Told by Dimnah to Kalila, defending his ability to take on the mighty ox with wit despite his small frame.

There was a crow who lived in a tree with a serpent who lived at the bottom in his burrow. However, the snake would eat the eggs of the crow. In revenge, the crow intended to claw out the snake's eyes, but he was discouraged by a jackal who told him to play smart. The jackal advised the crow to steal the jewelry of a human and make a show of throwing it into the snake's burrow. When the crow did this, the humans followed the crow to the burrow and upon finding the snake killed it and retrieved the jewelry, thus relieving the crow of the snake.

Sub-story of sub-story five - The toad and the crab - Told by the jackal to the crow as a warning that sometimes plans fail and have bad endings.

There was a toad who lived in a pond full of fish and would eat to his fill daily, however as he grew old he could not fish and so grew hungry. As the toad sat there, old, hungry and sad, thinking of a solution, a passing crab took pity on him and asked what the problem was. The toad told the crab that fishermen were going to come and take all the fish, so he was going to die of hunger. The crab told all the fish the news and they all went to the toad for advice. The toad suggested moving to a new and safer pond nearby, and he offered to transport two fish daily. The fish took upon his offer, but the toad would take the fish and would eat them and spit their bones out near the other pond. One day the crab asked to be transferred as he had become lonely, so the toad took him, but when they arrived the crab saw the heap of bones and realised what the toad had been doing the whole time, and so quickly grabbed the toad in its pincers and snapped its neck.

Sub-story six - The Rabbit and the Lion - Told by Dimnah to Kalila defending his ability in taking down the Ox after Kalila deemed him unfit for the job.

A lion ruled a jungle. The occupants gathered together and offered to present the lion an offering, so he would not hunt them. One day the draw fell to make another rabbit the sacrifice to the lion, however the empty-handed rabbit kept the hungry lion waiting. The furious lion demanded an explanation. The rabbit claimed that another rabbit was the intended sacrifice but refused, claiming that he was going to feed himself to the real king of the jungle—another lion. The challenge of the lion's authority incensed him, and he demanded the rabbit take him to the offending lion. The lion was taken to the edge of a well. The rabbit said to peer at the reflection of the real ruler of the jungle and the intended sacrifice. The lion roared, attacked his opponent and drowned.

Sub-story seven - The three fish - Told by Dimnah to the lion in an attempt to persuade him that the Ox will betray him, so he should strike first.

There were three fish in a pond, a wise one, a smart one and a shortsighted one. The fish overheard two fishermen walk past and say that they would come back and catch all the fish in the pond. The wise fish heard this and immediately left the pond and joined the river that flowed into the pond. The smart fish delayed until the fishermen arrived, but when he tried to leave, he was blocked by the nets of the fishermen. So he flopped out of the pond and pretended to be a dead fish so that the fishermen move him closer to the river, and when they did, he jumped into the river and swam away. As for the shortsighted fish, he was caught.

Sub-story eight - The louse and the flea- Told by Dimnah to the lion in an attempt to persuade him that the Ox will betray him, after the lion doubted Dimnah's claim of the Ox's betrayal There was a louse who would stay in the bed of a richman and drink his blood daily without getting caught. Then a flea visited one day and went with the louse to drink the blood of the richman, but when the flea bit the man, he ran away and the man woke up. The man only saw the louse and so killed the louse out of anger and pain.

Sub-story nine - The Wolf, the crow, the jackal and the camel - Told by Shatrabah to Dimnah after he suspects that it is the members of the lion's court that want him dead.

There was a lion who had three companions, a wolf, a crow and a jackal. One day a camel left his flock to join the lion, where he stayed for a long time. One day the lion was injured by an elephant and could no longer hunt; this was a problem for the wolf, crow and jackal, as they would scavenge the leftovers of the lion's hunt. However, they told the lion that they would hunt for him. Together they hatched a plan and proposed to the lion that they eat the camel; however, the lion angrily rebuffed the idea as he did not want to back-stab his friend. The crow tried to explain that sometimes sacrifices must be made for the greater good, and the lion stayed silent and that was the sign of his acceptance. They plotted that the three of them would present themselves to the lion to be eaten along with the camel, but for each of the three the other two would intercede and they would not eat him. When the camel offered himself to the lion, they did not intercede, and they all fell upon him and ate him.

Sub-story ten - The sea bird and the sea agent - Told by Dimnah to Shatrabah while proving his point that a person should not underestimate a weak opponent.

There were two sandpipers who were a couple, they had a nest near the sea. The wife insisted on moving their nest to avoid the sea agent, but the husband refused and when the tide came in the sea agent took the nest. The male sandpiper decided to call upon the king of the birds, the phoenix, for help, which he received. The phoenix went with a contingent of birds to attack the sea agent and reclaim the nest, but the sea agent gave it up out of fear and avoided confrontation.

Sub-story of sub-story ten - The Turtle and the two ducks - Told by the female sandpiper to the male sandpiper in an effort to convince him to move the nest.

A turtle lived in a pond with two ducks, but the pond's water levels were decreasing, so the turtle asked the ducks to help him move to another pond. Together they devised a plan that the ducks will hold two sides of a stick and fly to the other pond, while the turtle held on with its mouth. As they were flying, people on the ground started to marvel at this strange sight. The turtle, who was very self-conscious, cursed the onlookers, but in doing so, opened his mouth and fell to the ground and died.

Sub-story eleven - The monkeys and the bird - Told by Kalila to Dimnah, after Dimnah ignored all of Kalila's warnings and carried out his plan which killed the ox and injured the lion.

There was a troop of monkeys, who were cold and searching for fire one night, when they saw a glow worm and started to chase it. An onlooking bird knew that it was a glow worm and not fire and so called out to them to stop their futile chase, as it would not give them the warmth they desired. The monkeys ignored the bird and carried on. The bird was determined to convince them of their error, when a man said to the bird to leave the monkeys alone, because they are too stubborn to accept their error. The bird refused to listen to the man and flew to the monkeys to convince them, but they got angry and grabbed the bird and threw him to the ground, killing him.

Sub-story twelve - The cunning person and the naive person - Told by Kalila to Dimnah, warning him of the outcome of being cunning.

Two businessmen were travelling, when they came across a case of a thousand gold dinars. The cunning one proposed to the naive man that they each take a small portion and bury the rest under a nearby tree, and when any of them needed any of it, they would both return and take whatever was needed. The naive man agreed, and they buried the case and went their separate ways. However, the cunning man returned, dug up the treasure and took it all. After some time, the naive man visited the cunning man and told him that he needed some of the money, so they both went to the tree, dug up the area and found nothing. Immediately the cunning man turned on the naive man and accused him of taking all the money. The naive man, protesting his innocence, ended up in court with the cunning man. The judge asked the cunning man to provide evidence for his claim, the cunning man claimed that the tree would testify that the naive man stole all the money. The judge, intrigued, took the court to the tree to hear its testimony. The cunning man had told his father to hide in the tree and pretend to be the voice of the tree when asked questions. After the tree answered the judges' questions, the flabbergasted judge ordered the tree to be burnt down. The father, within the tree, started to scream and jumped out of the tree and confessed to the judge the whole plot. The judge then ruled in favour of the naive man and the cunning man had to return the gold dinars.

Sub-story thirteen - The merchant, the iron and the mice - Told by Kalila to Dimnah, scolding him as his image will be forever ruined if he is found out.

A merchant was leaving his city for a while on a business trip, and he had a large amount of iron in his possession, so he left it in trust with his friend for storage until he returned. When he returned and asked for his iron, his friend said that mice had eaten all of it. The merchant, furious, left the house and kidnapped one of his friend's children. The next day his friend approached him and asked if he had any knowledge of his child's whereabouts. The merchant replied that he saw a falcon swoop down and take him away the other day. His friend hit him on the head, baffled, and said “Have you ever seen a child be carried away by a falcon?!”. To which the merchant replied “Yes! In a land where mice eat iron, falcons also kidnap children!”. Upon hearing this the friend confessed to selling the iron and gave the merchant the money so that he may return his child.

Story Two - True brotherhood

Main Story - The Collared Pigeon

There was a crow who saw a hunter pass by and lay out a net and seeds. The crow watched as the hunter hid and a flock of pigeons along with their ruler, the collared pigeon, landed on the net to eat the seeds. When all the pigeons were trapped, they all tried to save themselves and fly away, but they were stuck. The collared pigeons ordered them to work together and fly off so that they could all be saved. The pigeons flew away while being pursued by the hunter and followed by the crow. The pigeon decided to ask his mouse friend to free all of them from the net, so they went to his hole and called him. The mouse freed the pigeons, which impressed the crow, who tried to become friends with him.

The mouse was wary and hostile to a known predator. However, the crow persisted and swore not to eat until the mouse becomes his friend. The mouse agreed to become his friend but was still afraid of the crows fellow crows, who were not as friendly as the crow. The crow promised to protect him and break ties with any crow who would be the mouse's enemy. After the friendship blossomed, the crow convinced the mouse to leave the human dwellings and move to the jungle and live with the crow and his tortoise friends. So, the crow took the mouse by the tail and flew him to the jungle.

One day, they were all relaxing in the jungle, when suddenly a deer burst into the gathering. Startled, the crow flew off, the mouse went into his hole and the tortoise into his shell. But when they realised that the deer was alone, they approached him. The deer told them that he was on the run from two hunters. The group of animals offered the deer to stay with them, out of the way of the hunters and safe, an offer which the deer accepted. After a while, one day, the crow flew into the air to find his friend, the deer. He found the deer caught in the net of two hunters, so he quickly returned to his friends and told them of their friend's plight. They rushed to save the deer, with the mouse cutting the net. However, the tortoise had also followed them to save his friend, they told him off for endangering himself, as he would be too slow if the hunters returned.

Suddenly, the hunters returned, and the friends ran and flew away, but the tortoise was caught. The friends hatched a plan to save the tortoise, wherein the deer and crow would bait the hunter further and further away from his camp, while the mouse freed the tortoise. After freeing the tortoise, the friends regrouped, and the hunter, now without any caught game, realised his predicament and became convinced that he was in a land of djinn or going insane, so he left.

Sub-story one - The mouse and the house of the pious man - Told by the mouse to the bird while travelling to the jungle.

The mouse used to reside in the house of a pious man, and he would scavenge the food of the man when he would leave the house. One day, the man had a guest, who he asked to get rid of the mouse. The guest dug a hole trying to find the mouse but found a case full of a hundred dinars (gold coins). The guest took the dinars (gold coins) and told the pious man that the coins allowed the mice to scavenge and so the guest and the man split the money between themselves. Meanwhile, the other mice approached the mouse for their normal supply of food, but he did not have any, so they shunned him and left him alone. The pious man went to sleep and put the money near his head. The mouse intended on taking the money while the man slept, so as to make friends again, but every time he tried, he failed and was hit. So he left the house and lived in the open, where he became friends with the pigeons.

’Story Three - The deceitful enemy

Main Story - The Owl and the Crows

There was a large murder of crows and a large parliament of owls living on a mountain. The two colonies disliked each other, and one night the king of the owls led an attack on the crow colony and killed many crows, took many as prisoners and injured many as well. The crows complained to their ruler, who then consulted the five wise crows of the colony. Three suggested running away and relocating from the mountain, one suggested to propose a treaty wherein the crows would pay the owls an annual tribute in lieu of safety. The king disliked the counsel of the first four owls. The fifth crow suggested that the crow king rip off some of the advisor's own feathers and attack him, leaving him in a disheveled state, so that he could infiltrate the owl colony as a double agent.

When the owls came upon the crow spy, they did not know what to do with him, so the owl ruler consulted his advisors, one said to kill him but the other two were in favour of keeping him alive as an advisor. The first advisor was still adamant that they should kill the crow, but he was ignored. The crow rose in status amongst the owls and learned their secrets. One day he returned to the crow colony and told them of the owls lair, they had burrows in the mountain side. The crows conspired to carry dry firewood and dump it into the burrows before setting them alight, therefore killing all the owls by fire or by the smoke. The crows executed their plan to perfection and all the owls were killed. The crow spy was welcomed back a hero for saving the crows from the owls.

Sub-story one - The crane and the crow - Told by the fifth crow advisor to the king regarding the origin of the hostility between the owls and the crows.

Once there was a swoop of cranes without a ruler and they decided to make an owl their new leader. However, while they were all gathered one day, a crow landed nearby, and they asked him his opinion on making the owl their leader. The crow lambasted the owls, calling them ugly, stupid, short-tempered, merciless and blind during the day. The cranes were convinced, and they revoked their offer of kingship from the owls. The owls were infuriated by being snubbed and vowed to forever be the enemies of the crows for their actions.

Sub-story one of sub-story one - The rabbits and the elephants - Told by the crow to the cranes in an attempt to dissuade them from appointing the owl their leader.

Once there was a herd of elephants who were thirsty and in need of water. They soon came across a pond called the “Moon Pond”. The area was heavily populated by rabbits, and they were trampled by the herd of elephants arriving at the pond. One moonlit night, a rabbit approached the elephant king and claimed to be a messenger from the moon itself. The rabbit told the elephant that the moon wanted the elephants to leave and never drink from the pond again, as they had spoiled it. The elephant looked at the pond and saw the reflection of the moon and how the moon seemed to tremble with rage when he tried to drink from it, and he prostrated to the moon and repented.

Sub-story two of sub-story one - The cat and the rabbit - Told by the crow to the cranes in an attempt to dissuade them from appointing a deceitful leader.

The crow told the story of his neighbour, a corncrake, who disappeared for a period of time, during which a rabbit came and took residence in the corncrake's house. When the corncrake returned and found the rabbit in his house, they argued over who had the right to reside there. They decided to take the case to a cat, who lived by the coast and was renowned for being pious. When the cat saw the two approaching, he quickly put on the act of a pious, righteous worshipper. After talking with the two for a while and gaining their trust, the cat pounced on both the rabbit and the corncrake and ate them both!

Sub-story two - The pious man and the goats - Told by the fifth crow advisor to the king to prove that trickery is superior to war.

There was a pious man who bought a large meaty goat for the purpose of sacrificing it. A group of people saw the goat and wanted it, so they hatched a plan to deceive the pious man. One by one they all approached the pious man and exclaimed in fake astonishment at the pious man sacrificing a dog. The pious man after hearing so many people calling his goat a dog became convinced that the seller had cast magic over his eyes and that the goat was actually a dog. He let the goat loose and the group sneakily took it away with them.

Sub-story three - The pious man, the thief and the devil - Told by the third owl advisor to the king owl to prove that it is better to keep the spy crow alive.

A pious man once bought a heifer and took it home. A thief and a devil followed him home, both intent on seizing the heifer while the man slept. When the man went to sleep, the thief and the devil started arguing over who should take the heifer. The argument ended in each of them calling out to the pious man that the other is trying to steal the heifer. The man woke up and all the village folk came rushing to the house, so the two scoundrels ran away.

Sub-story four - The pious man, the mouse and the rat - Told by the owl advisor who wanted to kill the crow to the crow, to show that you cannot change who you truly are.

There was once a pious man whose prayers were always accepted. One day a kite dropped a mouse near him and the man out of mercy took care of the mouse and prayed that it be turned into a girl. The man then took the girl to his house and told his wife to raise the girl as their daughter. When the girl grew up the father asked her to choose a husband to marry. She wanted to marry the strongest person, so she went and asked the sun to marry her. The sun told her to go to the clouds, as they were stronger as they cover him. The clouds told her to go to the winds, as they were stronger as they moved him. The winds told her to go to the mountain, as he was stronger as they could not move him. The mountain told her to go to the rat, who he could not stop burrowing inside him and living on him, so he was stronger. When the pious man asked the rat to marry the mouse, the rat said he did not have space in his burrow and could only marry mice. The pious man, with the girl's consent, prayed that the girl be returned to her mouse form, and she married the rat.

Sub-story five - The snake and the frog - Told by the crow spy to the crow king when asked how he endured staying amongst the enemy for so long.

There was once an old snake, who had grown weak and could no longer hunt. So, one day he lay down near a pond, which was home to an army of frogs. The ruler of the frogs approached the snake and asked him why he looked so down. The snake replied that he had bit the finger of the son of a pious man, resulting in the boy's death. The pious man had then chased him out and cursed him to be the mount of the frog king and that he could only eat the frogs that were gifted to him by the king. The king frog, eager to ride the snake to show off his status, took the snake's word and made him his mount, and would feed the snake two frogs daily. Thus the snake lived happily amongst his former prey.

Story Four - The person who wastes what he needs

Main Story - The Monkey and the Turtle

There was once a monkey king called Mahir, he grew old and was attacked and cast out by the younger monkeys. So he took up residence in an olive tree on the coast. He would throw olives into the sea to hear the sound of them plopping into the water. In the water was a turtle, who would eat the olives, and so decided to strike up a friendship with the monkey. The turtle and the monkey became very good friends, and the turtle would enjoy the monkey's company for long periods of time.

The wife of the turtle became jealous of the monkey taking all the turtle's time, and so consulted her neighbour. The neighbour suggested that when her husband turtle returns, she should pretend to be ill and say that the doctor has prescribed the only cure as the heart of the monkey. When the husband turtle was told about the cure, he returned to his friend and invited him to his home, a lush island with many trees laden with fruits, with the intent to kill him. The monkey agreed but the turtle became ashamed of his plans and tucked his head into his shell. The monkey became suspicious of the turtle and inquired about his behavior. The turtle told him that his wife was ill and so he feared he could not host the monkey to the best of his capability. They carried on to the island, with the monkey on the turtle's back. The turtle again mentioned his wife's illness and kept on acting more suspiciously. The monkey asked what the cure to his wife's illness was, and the turtle told him it was the heart of a monkey.

The monkey suddenly very aware of his predicament told the turtle that he should have mentioned that before they left, because it was customary among monkeys to leave their hearts at home before visiting a friend. The monkey told the turtle that they should return, so the monkey could get his heart and gladly give it to the turtle's wife. The turtle overjoyed by his friends commitment, swam back to the olive tree, whereupon the monkey quickly scrambled ashore and up his tree. The turtle waited for the monkey to return, but he did not, so he called up to the monkey to come down from the tree with his heart so they could return. The monkey scolded the turtle for his plan and his stupidity.

Sub-story one - The lion and the donkey - Told by the monkey to the turtle while scolding him for his stupidity in believing that the monkey could detach his heart

There was once a lion who had a jackal companion who would feed off his leftovers. However one day the lion contracted scabies and became too weak to hunt. The jackal concerned for the lion and his own well being asked the lion what could be done. The lion told him that the doctors say the only cure is the ears and heart of a donkey. The jackal, assuming the task to be simple, approached a captured donkey and offered it freedom from man if it followed him home, where the jackal claimed lived many other wild donkeys. The donkey readily followed the jackal to the lion, but the lion was too weak to attack it, frightened, the donkey ran away. The lion promised the jackal that if he had one more chance he would be able to attack the donkey and kill it. The jackal called the donkey back, claiming that the other donkeys wanted to welcome him. When the donkey returned, the lion pounced and caught the donkey. However the lion claimed that the doctors said one must eat the heart and ears after bathing. So while the lion went to bathe, the jackal ate the heart and ears of the donkey. When the lion returned and enquired about the heart and the ears, the jackal said that such a donkey that returned after being attacked once, obviously had no heart or ears, otherwise it would have used them the first time and not returned!

Story Five - The hasty imprudent

Main Story - The pious man and the weasel

There was once a couple who had no children, when one day the wife became pregnant. The couple were overjoyed and the father, a pious man, desired for a son. The wife gave birth to a son, and the father was delighted. One day the wife had to go for a bath, and so told the husband to watch the child. While she was gone, a messenger from the king came and summoned the father immediately. The pious man had nobody to take care of the baby while he was away, except for a domestic pet weasel, who he had raised from when he was a child. The man left the baby with the weasel and went to the king.

When the man returned he found the weasel with his mouth covered in blood. In a fit of rage, assuming that the weasel had killed his precious baby, he whacked the weasel on the head with a stick and killed it. However, after entering the house, he found the child was alive and safe, and saw a dead black snake next to the cot, that had been attacked and killed by the weasel. Realisation struck the man, that his best friend, the weasel, had protected his child from the snake, and that the blood was the blood of the snake. The man became consumed with grief over his hasty decision to kill the weasel. The wife returned and told the husband that this was the price of hastiness.

Sub-story one - The pious man, the fat and the honey - Told by the wife to the husband not to tempt fate by declaring the unborn baby a boy, as it is something beyond his knowledge.

There was once a pious man who would pass by the house of a businessman, who would daily give the pious man some fat and honey to eat. The pious man would eat his daily needs and store the rest in a jar which he hung in the corner of his house. One day, when the jar became full the pious man lay down thinking about his future. He planned to sell the jar for a dinar (gold coin) and then use the dinar to buy some goats, which would reproduce and multiply into a herd of goats. After that, he would trade the goats for a herd of cows and buy land for them to graze on and he would use their milk. Then he planned on building a grand house on the land and buying many slaves, male and female. He planned his marriage to a beautiful lady, who would birth him many sons, who he would raise nobly and reprimand with his staff if they went out of line. While planning this he motioned his staff in a hitting motion but accidentally hit the jar of honey and fat, causing it to fall and break.

Story Six - The person who befriends his enemies to save

Main Story - The rat and the cat

There was once a tree whose hollow trunk was home to a cat and its base was home to the burrow of a rat. Many hunters often passed the tree and laid their nets nearby, one day the cat got caught in a net while exiting his home. The same day, the rat left his home in search of his daily needs, when suddenly he was faced with a weasel intent on eating him, and an owl behind him ready to swoop down and catch him. The rat decided that his only escape was to approach the trapped cat. The rat offered to free the cat and cut the ropes of the net in exchange for security. The cat readily accepted, but the rat was still wary of the cat and so promised to keep one rope still attached until he was sure he was safe. The cat tried to gain the rat's trust but the rat stayed skeptical, until the time came where he freed the cat and made it safely into his burrow. The rat continued his daily searches for food but still kept his distance from the cat. The cat tried to call him in an attempt to reward him for freeing him, but the rat stayed cautious and would not approach the cat.

Story Seven - The nobles who should avoid each other'

Main Story- The Prince and the bird Fanzah

There was once an Indian king called Breedun who had a pet bird called Fanzah. Fanzah had a chick and the queen gave birth to a prince. The prince and the chick grew up together as friends. One day, while Fanzah was absent, the chick dropped excrement on the floor of the prince's room. The boy, enraged, grabbed the chick and threw it to the floor, killing it. When Fanzah returned, she cried out in despair, gouged out the eyes of the prince, flew away and landed on the roof of the palace. When the king found out, he was incensed. The king went to talk to Fanzah, calling her down, claiming she was safe as the prince deserved his punishment. However Fanzah refused, as she knew the rage of someone seeking revenge and knew the king would kill her; so she bid the king farewell and flew away.

Story Eight - The ruler who examines the punishment of the convicted innocent

Main Story - The lion and the pious jackal

There was once a pious jackal who, unlike his fellow brethren and predators, would not spill blood, eat meat or envy his fellows. His brethren disliked him but his fame reached the king of the jungle, the lion, who asked him to be part of his inner council. The jackal politely declined as he believed being involved in such affairs would only bring trouble. However, the lion insisted and the jackal accepted on the condition that if any case regarding the jackal was brought to the lion, he would not be hasty in his judgement. The lion appointed the jackal responsible for the treasury department. The other members of the lion's court grew jealous of the pious jackal and they all agreed to get the jackal in trouble.

The lion loved meat and gave a large portion to the jackal to store. The next day when the lion asked for the meat, it did not arrive. He was told by his advisors that the jackal had taken it. Upon summoning the jackal, the jackal claimed he had given the meat to the appointed food person to give to the king. The appointed food person denied ever receiving the meat. The lion sent a search party to the jackal's house where they found the meat, thereby incriminating the jackal, resulting in him being thrown into jail. The lion then summoned the jackal to defend his own case, but the other ministers sent a rude false reply back to the king, infuriating him. The king in his rage issued the execution of the jackal.

The lion's mother realised that the lion had acted hastily and calmed him down, she told him to investigate properly and not to execute a close friend over some meat! The mother suspected the other ministers and soon enough they came forward and confessed to their deception. The mother encouraged the lion to forgive and show grace to those who plotted against the jackal, as they would never dare to do anything similar again. She also instructed him to reconcile with the jackal and reinstate him. The jackal talked to the lion and at first did not want to return, but the lion convinced him to and honoured him even more when he did.

Story Nine - Forbearance, the most important quality of a ruler

Main Story - Iladh, Baladh and Irakht

There was once a king called, Baladh. One night, he saw eight dreams that frightened him, so he called the monks to interpret the dreams. The monks said they would return with the interpretation in a week. The monks hated the king, for he had killed twelve thousand monks. The monks plotted to tell the king that the dreams meant he had to kill those whom he loved and cared for the most, then bathe in their blood and be spat on by the monks, before being washed by perfume in order to avoid a terrible fate. They told the king he must kill his wife Irakht, his child Juwayr, his nephew, his close friend Iladh, his scribe and secret keeper Kaal, his great white elephant, his battle horse, two other great elephants, his fast strong Bactrian camel and the wiseman Kabariyoon, who was responsible for the death of the monks.

When the king was informed of this, he said he would rather die than have his close ones killed. The king retreated to his quarters in sorrow and grief. Iladh realised that the king was hiding something and so told Irakht to approach the king and find out what was troubling him, as he had seen the king with some monks and feared they may have said something to him. Irakht approached her husband, and he told her of the interpretation of the dream given by the monks. Irakht was frightened but knew of the monk's hatred for the king and so comforted the king and told him to ask Kabariyoon for the correct interpretation. Kabariyoon told the king that it meant in one week he would receive amazing gifts.

And so it transpired that a week later the king received amazing gifts. Overjoyed the king called his two wives Irakht and Hawraqnah to pick what they wanted from the gifts. Irakht picked a wreath and Hawraqanah picked a dress. The king would alternate his nights between his wives, one night, while with Irakht, Hawraqnah wore the shimmering beautiful dress and purposefully walked past the king. The king, transfixed and in love, scolded Irakht for choosing the wreath over the dress. Irakht angered by the criticism, struck her husband on the head with a plate. The king, shocked, called for Iladh and told him to execute his wife Irakht.

Iladh knew that the king had issued the order in anger and would cool down and regret it later, so he took Irakht and hid her in a hut, he then returned to the king with a bloodied sword and told him he had killed her. The king, now calm and collected, regretted his decision and was in deep sorrow. He proclaimed his love for Irakht openly and his remorse. Iladh then approached the king and told him that Irakht was still alive. The king was overjoyed and welcomed her back and raised her and Iladh in status. The king then executed the monks who had tried to deceive him, thereby gaining closure from his dreams.

Sub-story one - The two pigeons - Told by Iladh to the king to console him

There was once a pigeon couple, and they filled their nest with barley and wheat grain. They made a pact not to eat from the grain until winter, when there would be no food available elsewhere. When summer came, the moist grain dried up and shrunk in size. When the male pigeon saw the reduced grain, he accused the wife of eating from it and pecked her to death, while she swore, she did not. Then, when it rained and the grain grew in size, the male realised his mistake and he became engulfed in grief and remorse. He then stopped eating and drinking until he died.

Story Ten - The ex-oppressor who stands up to oppression after tasting it

Main Story - The lioness, the horseman and the jackal

There was once a lioness who had two cubs. One day, she left her cubs in their cave and went hunting. During this time, a horseman rode past the caves and killed the cubs and took their pelts. When the lioness returned and saw what had been done to her children, she shrieked and roared in grief. A neighbouring jackal visited her and told her that she had had it coming as what goes around comes around. The lioness distressed and confused asked the jackal to explain. The jackal told her that the action of the horseman was no different to the lioness’ own actions, as her prey also had parents who grieved the loss of their children.

The lioness upon hearing this, changed her ways and became a vegetarian and would only eat fruits and would spend most of her day in worship. One day, two doves approached her and scolded her for eating all the fruit, as she was the cause of a fruit shortage, which was depriving many animals of their daily food. The lioness profusely apologised and from that day on only ate grass and plants.

Story Eleven - The benefit and importance of having a wise advisor

Main Story - Mihrayiz the king of the rats

Once upon a time in the city of Badoor, there lived a rat king, who ruled over all the rats in the city. The king had three advisors, Rudhbadh, Shira’ and Baghdad. One day, they all gathered to discuss whether they could rid themselves of the ancestor's fear of cats. Rudhbadh said that one cannot change what they have genetically inherited from their ancestors. He suggested that the king consult the advisors for solutions. One suggested to tie bells to all the cats so that the rats were warned of their presence. The second dismissed the first's proposal and suggested that all the rats leave the city for a year, tricking the people into believing that no more cats are needed, so then they would kill all the cats, allowing the rats to return safely.

The third, Rudhbadh, suggested that the king should instruct all the rats to split into groups and infiltrate the homes with cats. Then the rats should damage the clothes and furnishings of the house but leave the food, that way the people will assume that the damage is due to the cats. The rats should also damage according to how many cats lived in the house, the more cats the more damage. This would result in the populace killing all the cats and even removing the cats in the wild, to save their homes. The rats carried out this plan and therefore successfully caused the extermination of all the cats in the city and sowed the hatred of cats within the population for generations, so that no cat could live in Badoor ever again.

Sub-story one - The king on the banks of the Nile - Told by the king rat's advisor to the king to warn of the consequences of carrying out a bad plan

There was once a king, who ruled near the Nile. In his kingdom lay a mountain full of lush greenery, trees and many animals. A tunnel sat in the mountain's side, from which the seven winds flew out. Near this tunnel was a marvellous palace, unrivalled in its brilliance. One day the king's advisors suggested that they close the tunnel and stop the winds, to make the palace area into a paradise. The advisors believed it may be impossible, but the king ordered all the people of the area to gather and block the hole with rocks, wood and soil. After much toil and effort, the people succeeded in blocking the hole. However, this prevented the breeze and gales from the hole spreading, thus causing the trees and water to dry up. Six months had not passed, and all the springs and crops had dried up, all the animals had died, and a barren wasteland was left for hundreds of miles. Many people died and those who remained marched on the king and killed him and his advisors. The revolters then went to the hole and set fire to the wood that was blocking it to let the air out. Once slightly opened, the six months' worth of trapped air burst out of the hole, taking the large fire with it and spreading it to all corners of the kingdom. Not one city, town or tree escaped the carnage of the fire.

Sub-story one of sub-story one - The donkey and the deer - Told by the king's advisors to the king, warning him not to attempt the impossible

There was once a donkey who was kept tied up by his owner so he would not run off after female onagers. One day the donkey saw a deer with its magnificent antlers being led by its owner to a nearby stream, the donkey deeply wished to have antlers. So the next day, he broke out of captivity and followed the deer to the stream and tried to converse with it. However, the deer did not understand donkey talk. The donkey was convinced that it was the presence of the owner that was preventing them from conversing, so he attacked and bit the owner. The owner of the deer wanted to mark the donkey so he could find it later, so he sliced its ears off. The donkey, in pain, returned to its master, who was furious that it had run off, and received a worse punishment than having its ears sliced, from his own master. The donkey realised that such desires were foolish and pursuing them only ended badly.

Story Twelve - The one who leaves what is suitable for him in a forever exhausting and impossible search of the unsuitable

Main Story - The pious man and the guest

There was once a pious man who served a guest of some local dates. The foreign guest really liked the dates and wanted to know how he could plant and grow the dates in his city. The pious man told him that his city already had many fruits, so there was no need to plant dates there. It would be an unnecessary burden and it may not even work, as your land may not be suitable for its growth. The guest decided to drop the subject.

The pious man spoke Hebrew and the guest wanted to also learn the language. The guest tried to learn the language and spent many days doing so. The pious man told the guest to stop ignoring his own tongue and focusing on Hebrew, as then he would forget his mother tongue and will also still be inept at Hebrew, thereby failing at both.

Sub-story one - The crow and the partridge - Told by the pious man to the guest to convince him not to focus completely on Hebrew.

There was once a crow who saw a partridge walking. The crow was intrigued by the walking style of the partridge and spent a long time trying to copy it. However, he could not succeed and so gave up. But when he tried to walk like a crow again, he could not do it properly and so he gained the worse walk of any bird.

Story Thirteen - Awaiting gratitude for a misplaced favour

Main Story - The tourist and the jeweller

Once there was a tourist who passed by a well, wherein a jeweller, a monkey, a snake and a tiger had got stuck. The tourist decided to help them out of good will. First the monkey came out, then the snake, then the tiger, all three told the man not to help the jeweller, as humans are the most ungrateful beings. However, the tourist ignored them and helped the jeweller out as well. The three animals told the tourist that if he ever needs any help while passing by their homes he should just call and they would answer. The jeweller told the tourist that if he ever went to the city Nawadirakht, he should seek him out and he may be able to return the favour.

After some time had passed, by chance the tourist had to visit that city. As he approached, the monkey appeared and gifted him a juicy fruit, which he ate thankfully. Then, as he came to the door of the city, the tiger approached him and promised to repay him. The tiger went to one of the palace gardens, killed the princess and took her necklace, giving it to the tourist without telling him of its origin. The tourist, very happy by the treatment received from the animals, intended on approaching the jeweller. When the jeweller saw him, he welcomed him in and sat him down. When the jeweller saw the necklace, he immediately knew it was the princess’ as he had made it himself for her. He took this as an opportunity and went to the palace and told them that the princess’ murderer is at his home. The tourist was found with the necklace and promptly arrested.

It was judged that he be punished and walked around the city and then crucified. While they were doing this, the tourist cried out in anguish how he should have listened to the three animals and not saved the man. The snake heard this and bit the prince, poisoning him such that none of the doctors could cure him. The snake then asked his djinn friend to make the prince believe that the only cure was if the tourist read an incantation over him, as they had wrongly punished him. The snake then entered the tourist's cell and gave him a leaf which was the cure to his own poison and told the tourist to tell the prince his story and he should be freed. When the tourist was summoned, he fed the leaf to the prince, curing him. The king gifted the tourist immensely and upon hearing his story had the jeweller crucified for his lies and ungratefulness.

Story Fourteen - The fortunate ignorant and the unfortunate

Main Story - The prince and his companions

There was once a group of four, a son of a king, a son of a businessman, a handsome son of a nobleman and a son of a farmer. The group was in need and had nothing but the clothes on their backs. The prince believed in fate, the businessman's son believed in intelligence, the nobleman's son believed in beauty and the farmer's son believed in hard work. They came upon a city and the group decided to send the farmer's son first to earn for the day's means. The farmer's son gathered a ton of firewood and sold it all for a single dirham (silver coin). At the end of the day, he walked past the city gates and wrote on them “a cost of a day when one works hard, is one dirham”.

The next day the son of the nobleman went into the city and sat down under a tree and fell asleep. A city nobleman passed by and astonished by the beauty of the young man realised it to be the genetics of a noble household. Feeling sympathy for the boy he gifted him five hundred dirhams. The nobleman's son wrote on the gate “a day’s worth of beauty is five hundred dirhams”.

The next day the businessman's son went into the city. The boy went to the docks, where a fisherman's boat had bought in many fish. The businessmen of the city had gathered and planned to return later to buy it at a reduced price. The boy approached the fisherman and bought all the fish on credit for one hundred thousand dirhams. He then went about spreading the news that he planned on taking all the fish to another city. The businessmen in a panic rushed to buy from him and the boy made a profit of one hundred thousand dirhams. The businessman's son wrote on the gate “the price of a day’s worth of intelligence is one hundred thousand dirhams”.

The next day the prince was sent into the city. The prince sat by the gates of the city and waited. It so transpired that that day the king had died and left no heir. When the funeral passed the prince, he was asked why he did not grieve. The gatekeeper then arrested the prince and put him in jail. The next day when the city gathered to appoint a new leader, the gatekeeper told them of the strange boy near the gates the previous day. The prince was summoned and told the people of his ancestry and lineage and how his brother had usurped the throne after their father's demise, so he had fled the city. The people who had visited the prince's land in the gathering recognised him and supported his claim. The people then decided to appoint the prince as their new leader.

During his coronation procession he passed the gates of the city and ordered for it to be written that “Hardwork, beauty, intelligence and any good or bad one gains in this world is due to the decree of God”. The new king then summoned his companions and appointed the intelligent one as a minister and made the hardworking one a farmer. He then gave the handsome one a large sum of money to be rid of him. The king then gathered his advisors and talked to them regarding the importance of having faith and believing in God and fate. One advisor told the king of his own personal experience of fate.

The advisor used to work for a nobleman who would pay him two dinars. One day, the advisor took the two dinars and went to the market with the intention of giving one in charity and keeping the other. He saw a man selling two captured hoopoe birds who were a couple. The man would only sell both of them together and only for the full price of two dinars. The advisor, intent on carrying out his deed, gave up bargaining and purchased the two malnutrition birds for two dinars. He then released them in a lush garden full of fruit trees. The hoopoe birds decided to tell the advisor of a bag full of gold coins, hidden in a tree. The advisor took the bag and indeed it was full of gold coins. The advisor praised God for his turn in fortune.

Story Fifteen - One who advises others but not himself

Main Story - The pigeon, the fox and the heron

There was once a pigeon who made a nest in a tree and laid an egg in it. When the egg was ready to hatch, a fox came to the foot of the tree and demanded that the pigeon give him the newborn chick to eat. This continued for the next egg too. One day a heron passed by the pigeon and advised it to challenge the fox to climb the tree and take the eggs himself. The next time the fox came, the pigeon acted on the heron's advice. The fox, stumped, asked the pigeon where it learnt such a retort. The pigeon informed the fox of her teacher the heron. The fox approached the heron, who had nested near the river. The fox asked the heron to show him how it could tuck its head under its wing. While the heron displayed this, the fox attacked the heron and killed it, all the while mocking the heron for providing the pigeon with a trick, but not being smart enough to avoid the fox's trick.

== Morals ==
Story One - The person who infiltrates a friendship to break it up and its consequences

Main Story - The Lion and the Ox

- He who tries to benefit himself by harming others and via trickery will get his fair recompense. He will be figured out and be disgraced, ending up worse off than before his plan.
- It is imperative that one investigates any information he may receive, to ensure its credibility.

Sub-story One - The Man and the Wolf

- Death is inevitable and trying to avoid it may make matters worse.

Sub-story two - The Monkey and the Carpenter - Told by Kalila to Dimnah to discourage him from his plans to get involved with the royal court.

- He who involves himself with that which does not concern him will live to regret it.

Sub-story five - The crow and the serpent - Told by Dimnah to Kalila, defending his ability to take on the mighty ox with wit, despite his small frame.

- Trickery and intelligence are superior to strength.
- A strong person should not belittle the weak.
- A weak person should not lose hope, as his intelligence can take him places.

Sub-story of sub-story five - The toad and the crab - Told by the jackal to the crow as a warning that sometimes plans fail and have bad endings.

- Some plans may be detrimental to the plotter, and he may end up worse off. This often happens to those who plot and deceive to reach their goals, without caring about the consequences it will have on others. As doing so may result in people turning on you, preventing you from reaching your goal.
- Attempting to harm another through physical confrontation may backfire.
- A clever plan is sometimes superior to plain fighting when trying to solve a problem.

Sub-story six - The Rabbit and the Lion - Told by Dimnah to Kalila, defending his ability to take down the Ox, after Kalila deemed him unfit for the job.

- Intelligence is more beneficial than strength, as only certain things can be achieved by it.

Sub-story seven - The three fish - Told by Dimnah to the lion in an attempt to persuade him that the Ox will betray him, so he should strike first.

- There are three types of people: the prepared, the super-prepared and the incompetent. One should aim to be of the first two.
- Prevention is better than cure.

Sub-story eight - The louse and the flea- Told by Dimnah to the lion in an attempt to persuade him that the Ox will betray him, after the lion doubted Dimnah's claim of the Ox's betrayal.

- Nobody is safe from an evildoer's evil, even if the evildoer is small and weak

"Sub-story nine - The Wolf, the crow, the jackal and the camel" - Told by Shatrabah to Dimnah after he suspects that it is the members of the lion's court that want him dead.

- When a group of weak evil people plot against an innocent, they can overpower him, even if the innocent is stronger than them.
- A strong person should not be disillusioned by his strength when surrounded by weaker people.

Sub-story ten - The sea bird and the sea agent - Told by Dimnah to Shatrabah, while proving his point that a person should not underestimate a weak opponent.

- He who undermines a weak opponent will live to regret it, as the opponent may seek assistance and together, they may defeat you. Strength resides in numbers.
- Preparation will save you from many possible problems. (If you listen to your wife's advice)

Sub-story of sub-story ten - The Turtle and the two ducks - Told by the female sandpiper to the male sandpiper in an effort to convince him to move the nest.

- One should adopt any good counsel he receives.

Sub-story eleven - The monkeys and the bird - Told by Kalila to Dimnah, after Dimnah ignored all of Kalila's warnings and carried out his plan, which killed the ox and injured the lion

- There is no point or benefit in trying to advise the one who does not wish to be advised. It may even lead to a harmful outcome for the person who intended well.

Sub-story twelve - The cunning person and the naive person - Told by Kalila to Dimnah, warning him of the outcome of being cunning.

- Deception often leads to the humiliation of the deceiver. He who digs a hole for his brother will ultimately fall into it himself.
- It is a mistake to have complete trust in somebody, even if it is a close friend. Be wary of your enemy once, but of your friends a thousand times over, for they can do more harm if they turn on you.

Sub-story thirteen - The merchant, the iron and the mice - Told by Kalila to Dimnah, scolding him as his image will be forever ruined if he is found out.

- Trying to deceive someone often fails and may result in a revenge attempt, which would be unfortunate for you, or result in an exposé, which would be humiliating.

Story Two- True brotherhood

Main Story - The Collared Pigeon

- Nothing is more valuable than true friendship.
- The weak can band together and keep each other safe no matter what comes their way.
- People should work together and help each other.

Sub-story one - The mouse and the house of the pious man - Told by the mouse to the bird, while travelling to the jungle

- He who has no wealth often cannot achieve his goal, as wealth opens avenues. However, sometimes willpower and help from others can be more important.
- He who has no friends has no family.
- Poverty is the root of all problems.
- Poor people are often looked down on and accused.
- Any good quality of a rich man is a fault in a poor person. If he gives in charity, he is wasteful. If he is forbearing, he is labelled weak.
- Greed leads to many problems, whereas contentment is very valuable and everlasting.

Story Three - The deceitful enemy

Main Story - The Owl and the Crows

- One should not trust the enemy, even if they appear to be friendly and have your best interests at heart.

Sub-story one - The crane and the crow - Told by the fifth crow advisor to the king regarding the origin of the hostility between the owls and the crows.

- Words have consequences and we must be careful and think of the consequences of how we use our tongues. If speaking is silver, then silence is gold.

Sub-story one of sub-story one - The rabbits and the elephants - Told by the crow to the cranes in an attempt to dissuade them from appointing the owl their leader.

- The weak can save themselves from the strong and oppressive, using their intelligence and smart planning.

Sub-story two of sub-story one - The cat and the rabbit - Told by the crow to the cranes in an attempt to dissuade them from appointing a deceitful leader

- One must be on their guard around everyone, even the one who seems to be good and pious, as many people are different on the inside to the person they show to others.

Sub-story two - The pious man and the goats - Told by the fifth crow advisor to the king to prove that trickery is superior to war

- One can often gain what he wants through stratagem.

Sub-story three - The pious man, the thief and the devil - Told by the third owl advisor to the king owl to prove that it is better to keep the spy crow alive

- The smart person can benefit from the enmity of his enemies between themselves, to save himself from their harm. For if they are divided, they provide a lesser threat than if they were united against you.

Sub-story four - The pious man, the mouse and the rat - Told by the owl advisor, who wanted to kill the crow, to the crow, to show that you cannot change who you truly are

- One's identity and inner self will never change, no matter how many different environments he experiences.

Sub-story five - The snake and the frog - Told by the crow spy to the crow king, when asked how he endured staying amongst the enemy for so long

- One should endure short term discomfort for the long term gains.
- Some will rather live disgraced than die nobly, despite death being inevitable.

Story Four - The person who wastes what he needs

Main Story - The Monkey and the Turtle

- Gaining something is often easier than retaining it.
- One should not be neglectful of what he already has.

Sub-story one - The lion and the donkey - Told by the monkey to the turtle, while scolding him for his stupidity in believing that the monkey could detach his heart

- The impossible does not exist.

Story Five - The hasty imprudent person

Main Story - The pious man and the weasel

- Acting hastily without thinking will end badly and in regret.
- Think before you act.

Sub-story one - The pious man, the fat and the honey - Told by the wife to the husband, not to tempt fate by declaring the unborn baby a boy, as it is something beyond his knowledge.

- One should not be consumed by dreams and desires, but should work on reality and what he has at present. Otherwise, he will soon realise that he had wasted his time and could have actually achieved it but had not.

Story Six - The person who befriends his enemies to save himself

Main Story - The rat and the cat

- One can never be completely sure if a person is a true friend and not a hidden enemy.
- One should not make a person his complete friend nor complete enemy, as they may change.

Story Seven - The nobles who should avoid each other

Main Story- The Prince and the bird Fanzah

- When a problem arises between two friends and resentment stays, it is best to avoid each other.

Story Eight - The ruler who examines the punishment of the convicted innocent

Main Story - The lion and the pious jackal

- One should not jump to conclusions regarding those whom he trusts, even if based on the claim of others.
- Rushing into things will result in regret.
- A person of responsibility should be cautious, so as not to fall victim to his enemies.
- When a person realises he has treated someone unfairly due to an error in judgement, he should be quick to apologise. If it was public, he should announce his error to clear the reputation of the falsely judged.
- Slanderers should be dealt with severely as a deterrent to others.

Story Nine - Forbearance, the most important quality of a ruler

Main Story - Iladh, Baladh and Irakht

- Do not seek advice from those you have wronged, for they will seek revenge by offering you bad counsel.
- Do not accept a view that is illogical or contradicts your faith.
- Do not rush into things.
- Control your anger.
- Act with foresight.

Sub-story one - The two pigeons - Told by Iladh to the king to console him

- Do not rush to conclusions and do not be quick to pass judgement over others.

Story Ten - The ex-oppressor who stands up to oppression after tasting it

Main Story - The lioness, the horseman and the jackal

- Often a taste of their own medicine causes people to realise the error in their ways.
- What goes around, comes around.
- Treat others as you would like to be treated.

Story Eleven - The benefit and importance of having a wise advisor

Main Story - Mihrayiz the king of the rats

- The weak can team up and use their intelligence to defeat the enemy.
- One should examine the pros and cons of a plan before deciding to do it.
- One should consult with other in matters of importance.
- One should take on board the outcome of a consultation and not ignore it.

Sub-story one - The king on the banks of the Nile - Told by the rat king's advisor to the king to warn of the consequences of carrying out a bad plan

- Some plans can cause irreversible and heavy damage, and leave you worse off.

Sub-story one of sub-story one - The donkey and the deer - Told by the king's advisors to the king, warning him not to attempt the impossible

- Attempting the impossible will only hurt you.

Story Twelve - The one who leaves what is suitable for him in a forever exhausting and impossible search of the unsuitable

Main Story - The pious man and the guest

- It is foolish to try something that does not suit you.

Sub-story one - The crow and the partridge - Told by the pious man to the guest to convince him not to focus completely on Hebrew

- One should not completely disregard what one already knows in favour of something else.

Story Thirteen - Awaiting gratitude for a misplaced favour

Main Story - The tourist and the jeweller

- One should help and be favourable to those who value and deserve it, regardless of whether they are distant or close.

Story Fourteen - The fortunate ignorant and the unfortunate wiseman

Main Story - The prince and his companions

- Nothing is impossible for God.
- What God has decreed will come to pass, one way or another.

Story Fifteen - One who advises others but not himself

Main Story - The pigeon, the fox and the heron

- A person who imparts beneficial advice to others should help themselves too and seek advice from others for their own issues.
- Certain people understand situations better as an onlooker and fail to come up with solutions when they experience it themselves.

== In film and TV ==
In 2021, film producer Pedro Alonso Pablos adapted the main content of the Calila e Dimna to an animated mini-series.

== See also ==
- Literature of Alfonso X
