= Jayashree =

Jayashree is an Indian name. People with the name include:

- M. Jayashree, Indian actress
- B. Jayashree, Indian actress, director and singer
- Jayashree (Tamil actress), Indian actress
- Jayashree Banerjee (born 1938), a leader of the Bharatiya Janata Party of India
- Jayashree Patanekar, Hindustani classical vocalist
- Jayashree Ramadas, Indian scientist

== See also ==
- Jayashri
