= Jayshree Satpute =

- Occupations: Advocate in Supreme Court and High Courts of India
- Notable work: Founding of Nazdeek, a NGO for legal empowerment

Recognized by The Guardian (UK) as one of the "World's Top 100 Inspiring Women," in 2011 Jayshree Satpute is a human rights lawyer and co-founder of Nazdeek. Satpute is a legal advocate in human rights pursuing cases in the Supreme Court and High Courts of India related to injustices to slum dwellers, refugees, women labourers, care of orphaned children, juveniles, Right to Information (RTI), and related issue areas.

Satpute is one of the cofounders of Nazdeek ("to be close" in Urdu), an NGO which brings justice to marginalized communities across India, providing legal support and legal empowerment trainings to women working in the tea gardens of Assam and living in slums in Delhi. In 2015, Nazdeek was awarded the Namati Justice Prize for serving as, "a shining example of impact and sustainability."

Satpute has coauthored many texts, including a book titled "Social and Economic Rights in Theory and Practice," Routledge Press UK 2014. In this book, she discussed, in the national and international contexts, the law pertaining to refugees so that practitioners of law could take action to establish a framework to address humanitarian issues. She also authored “Clinical Legal Education: A Way Towards Upscaling Access to Justice in India” in Bar and Bench, co-authored "Right to Information Law," HRLN Publication, and co-edited the book "Refugee and Law 2nd Edition," HRLN 2011.

== Biography ==
Satpute was raised in Chandrapur, India. She attended Vidya Niketan before going on to attend university at Babasaheb Ambedkar University College of Law in Nagpur. Satpute earned a postgraduate degree in law from the City University London. After graduation, she interned with the Coalition for the International Criminal Court at The Hague before moving to New Delhi. She then began practicing law with the goal of empowering underprivileged people within the Indian justice system by filing Public Interest Litigations (PILs) in the higher courts in various parts of the country.

An issue that Satpute highlighted in the Delhi High Court was the death of a homeless mother who gave birth without assistance and was left on the street without medical attention for four days in Laxmi Mandal v. Deen Dayal Harinagar Hospital & ORS, W.P.(C) 8853/2008. The High Court in Delhi ruled that the mother's human rights had been violated and the case resulted in the first decision in the world to recognize maternal mortality as a human rights violation and to award constitutional damages. The case brought national and international attention to the plight of, "marginalised women of India, who are most at risk of dying in childbirth." Satpute's other landmark legal victories include Court of its Own Motion v. U.O.I., W.P.(C) 5913/2010 in which the government of Delhi ordered the construction of three exclusive shelter homes for homeless pregnant and lactating women, Rosemary Dzuvichu & Another Vs. The State of Nagaland in which the government of Nagaland was ordered to hold elections ensuring reservation for women, and Mukandi Lal Vs. Municipal Corporation of Delhi W.P. 8904/2009 in which the court found the government's failure to follow due process and provide rehabilitation services to victims violated binding constitutional and international human rights obligations and ordered rehabilitation and established a procedure to be adopted prior to eviction.

Satpute founded Nazdeek in 2012, using a legal empowerment model to promote the rights of tea garden workers in Assam and improve their living conditions. Nazdeek works with organizations such as the Promotion and Advancement of Justice, Harmony and Rights of Adivasis (PAJHRA), People's Action for Development (PAD), and student organisations in Assam and currently collaborates with the Tezpur Law College to provide clinical legal education for law students. Since then, Nazdeek has started working in Delhi on issues of housing rights and the right to safe motherhood for women living in informal urban housing.
