= Panchatantra =

Ancient Sanskrit text of fables from India

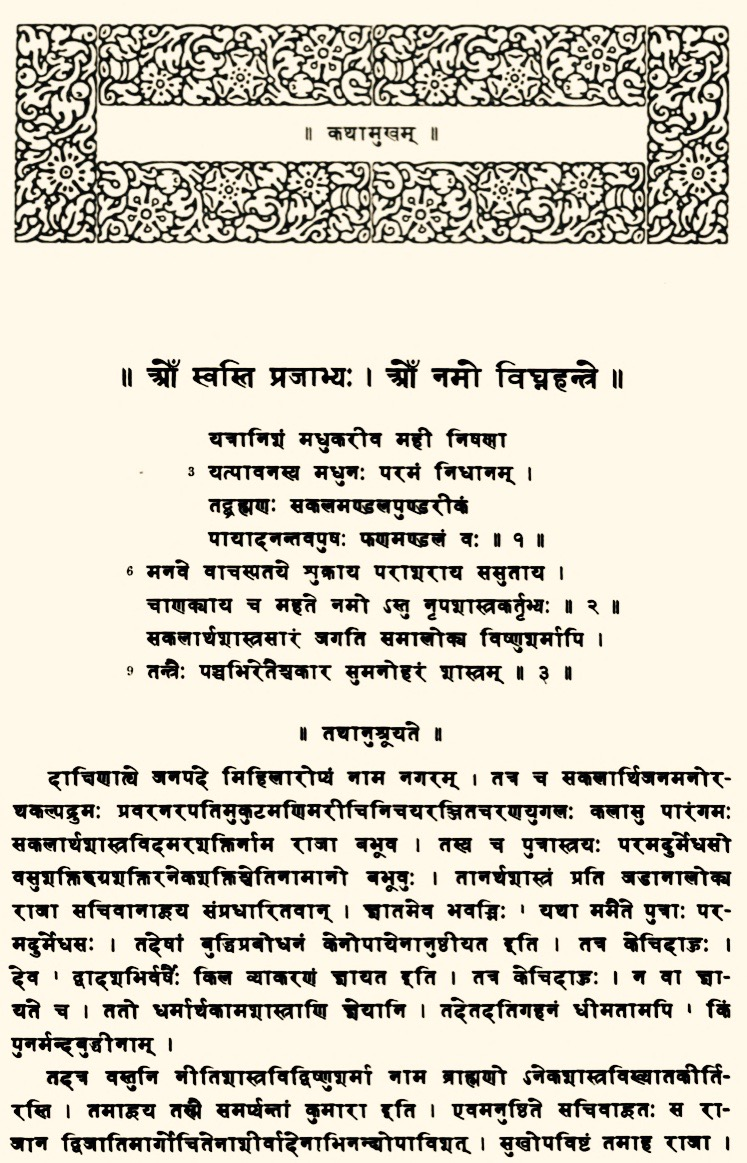
The first page of oldest surviving Panchatantra text in Sanskrit

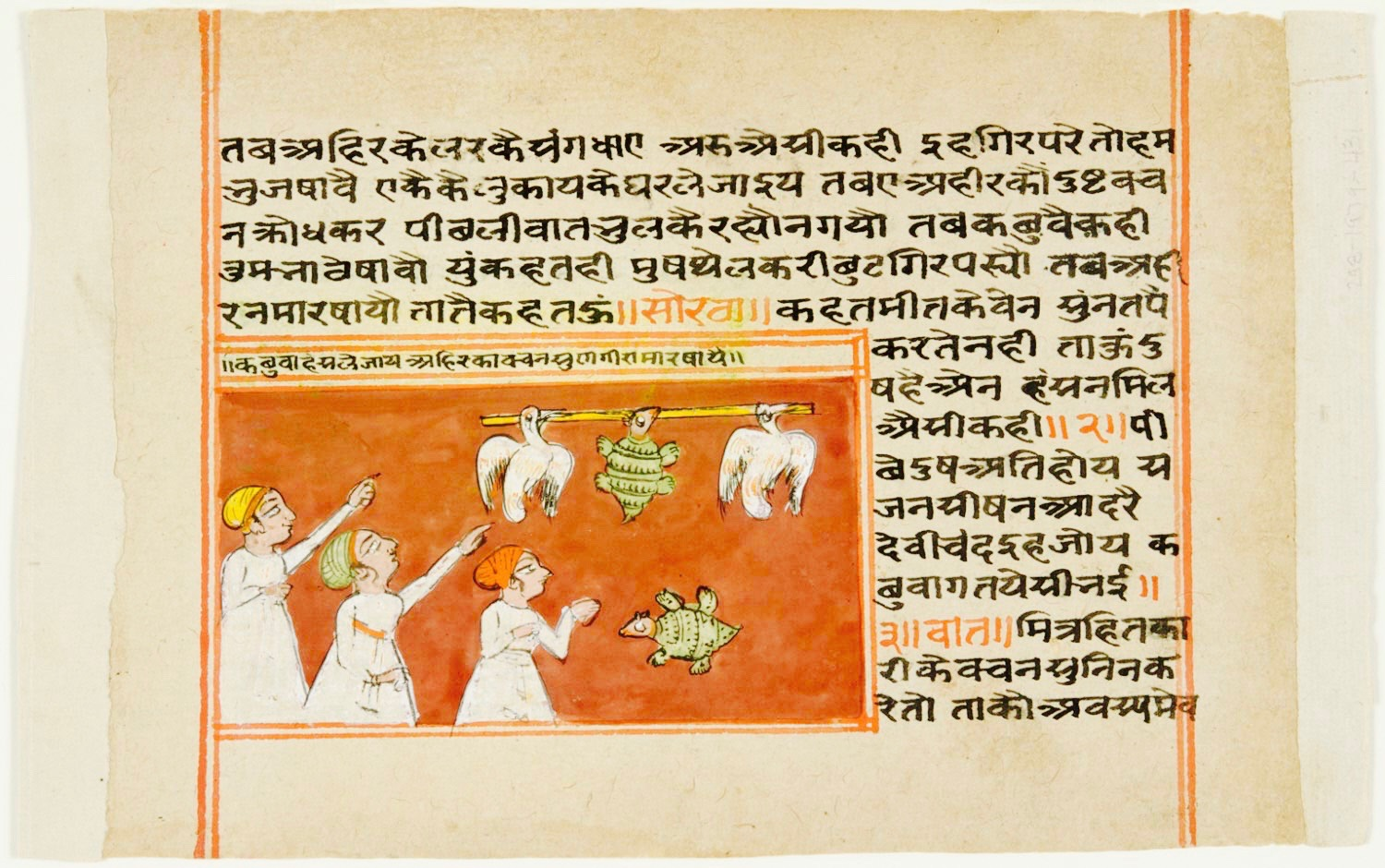
An 18th-century Pancatantra manuscript page in Braj ("The Talkative Turtle")

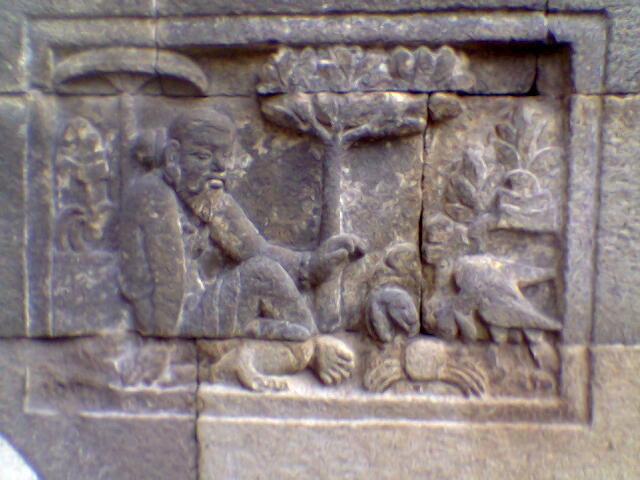
A Panchatantra relief at the Mendut temple, Central Java, Indonesia

The Panchatantra (IAST and ISO: Pañcatantra; Sanskrit: पञ्चतन्त्र; lit. 'Five Treatises') is an ancient Indian collection of interrelated animal fables in Sanskrit verse and prose, arranged within a frame story. The text's author is unknown, but it has been attributed to Vishnu Sharma in some recensions and Vasubhaga in others, both of which may be fictitious pen names. It is likely a Hindu text, and based on older oral traditions with "animal fables that are as old as we are able to imagine".

It is "certainly the most frequently translated literary product of India", and these stories are among the most widely known in the world. It goes by many names in many cultures. There is a version of Panchatantra in nearly every major language of India, and in addition there are 200 versions of the text in more than 50 languages around the world. One version reached Europe in the 11th century. To quote Edgerton (1924):

...before 1600 it existed in Greek, Latin, Spanish, Italian, German, English, Old Slavonic, Czech, and perhaps other Slavonic languages. Its range has extended from Java to Iceland... [In India,] it has been worked over and over again, expanded, abstracted, turned into verse, retold in prose, translated into medieval and modern vernaculars, and retranslated into Sanskrit. And most of the stories contained in it have "gone down" into the folklore of the story-loving Hindus, whence they reappear in the collections of oral tales gathered by modern students of folk-stories.

The earliest known translation, into a non-Indian language, is in Middle Persian (Pahlavi, 550 CE) by Burzoe. This became the basis for a Syriac translation as Kalilag and Damnag and a translation into Arabic in 750 CE by Persian scholar Abdullah Ibn al-Muqaffa as Kalīlah wa Dimnah. A New Persian version by Rudaki, from the 9th-10th century CE, became known as Kalīleh o Demneh. Rendered in prose by Abu'l-Ma'ali Nasrallah Monshi in 1143 CE, this was the basis of Kashefi's 15th-century Anvār-i Suhaylī (The Lights of Canopus), which in turn was translated into Humayun-namah in Turkish. The book is also known as The Fables of Bidpai (or Pilpai in various European languages, Vidyapati in Sanskrit) or The Morall Philosophie of Doni (English, 1570). Most European versions of the text are derivative works of the 12th-century Hebrew version of Panchatantra by Rabbi Joel. In Germany, its translation in 1480 by Anton von Pforr has been widely read. Several versions of the text are also found in Indonesia, where it is titled as Tantri Kamandaka, Tantravakya or Candapingala and consists of 360 fables. In Laos, a version is called Nandaka-prakarana, while in Thailand it has been referred to as Nang Tantrai.

== Author and chronology ==
The prelude section of the Panchatantra identifies an octogenarian Brahmin named Vishnusharma (IAST: Viṣṇuśarman) as its author. He is stated to be teaching the principles of good government to three princes of Amarasakti, the king of Mahilaropya. It is unclear, states Patrick Olivelle, a professor of Sanskrit and Indian religions, if Vishnusharma was a real person or himself a literary invention. Some South Indian recensions of the text, as well as Southeast Asian versions of Panchatantra attribute the text to Vasubhaga, states Olivelle. Based on the content and mention of the same name in other texts dated to ancient and medieval era centuries, most scholars agree that Vishnusharma is a fictitious name. Olivelle and other scholars state that regardless of who the author was, it is likely "the author was a Hindu, and not a Buddhist, nor Jain", but it is unlikely that the author was a devotee of Hindu god Vishnu because the text neither expresses any sentiments against other Hindu deities such as Shiva, Indra and others, nor does it avoid invoking them with reverence.

Various locations where the text was composed have been proposed but this has been controversial. Some of the proposed locations include Kashmir, Southwestern or South India. The text's original language was likely Sanskrit. Though the text is now known as Panchatantra, the title found in old manuscript versions varies regionally, and includes names such as Tantrakhyayika, Panchakhyanaka, Panchakhyana and Tantropakhyana. The suffix akhyayika and akhyanaka mean "little story" or "little story book" in Sanskrit.

The text was translated into Pahlavi in 550 CE, which forms the latest limit of the text's existence. The earliest limit is uncertain. It quotes identical verses from Arthasastra, which is broadly accepted to have been completed by the early centuries of the common era. According to Olivelle, "the current scholarly consensus places the Panchatantra around 300 CE, although we should remind ourselves that this is only an educated guess". Johannes Hertel had dated the work to around 200 BC, stating that individual fables by this time were already ancient. The text quotes from older genre of Indian literature, and legends with anthropomorphic animals are found in more ancient texts dated to the early centuries of the 1st millennium BCE such as the chapter 4.1 of the Chandogya Upanishad. According to Gillian Adams, Panchatantra may be a product of the Vedic period, but its age cannot be ascertained with confidence because "the original Sanskrit version has been lost".

== Content ==
What is learning whose attaining,
Sees no passion wane, no reigning
Love and self-control?
Does not make the mind a menial,
Finds in virtue no congenial
Path and final goal?
Whose attaining is but straining
For a name, and never gaining
Fame or peace of soul?

— Panchatantra: Smart, The Jackal
Book 1: The Loss of Friends
Translator: Arthur William Ryder

The Panchatantra is a series of inter-woven fables, many of which deploy metaphors of anthropomorphized animals with human virtues and vices. Its narrative illustrates, for the benefit of three ignorant princes, the central Hindu principles of nīti. While nīti is hard to translate, it roughly means prudent worldly conduct, or "the wise conduct of life".

Apart from a short introduction, it consists of five parts. Each part contains a main story, called the frame story, which in turn contains several embedded stories, as one character narrates a story to another. Often these stories contain further embedded stories. Besides the stories, the characters also quote various epigrammatic verses to make their point.

The five books have their own subtitles.

Panchatantra
Book subtitle	Ryder's translation	Olivelle's translation
1. Mitra-bheda	The Loss of Friends	On Causing Dissension among Allies
2. Mitra-lābha	The Winning of Friends	On Securing Allies
3. Kākolūkīyam	On Crows and Owls	On War and Peace: The story of the crows and the owls
4. Labdhapraṇāśam	Loss of Gains	On Losing What You have Gained
5. Aparīkṣitakārakaṃ	Ill-Considered Action	On Hasty Actions

=== Book 1: Mitra-bheda ===
If loving kindness be not shown,
to friends and souls in pain,
to teachers, servants, and one's self,
what use in life, what gain?

— Panchatantra, Book 1
Translator: Arthur William Ryder

The first treatise features a jackal named Damanaka, as the unemployed minister in a kingdom ruled by a lion. He, along with his moralizing sidekick named Karataka, conspire to break up alliances and friendships of the lion king. A series of fables describe the conspiracies and causes that lead to close and inseparable friends breaking up.

The Book 1 contains over thirty fables, with the version Arthur Ryder translated containing 34: The Loss of Friends, The Wedge-Pulling Monkey, The Jackal and the War-Drum, Merchant Strong-Tooth, Godly and June, The Jackal at the Ram-Fight, The Weaver's Wife, How the Crow-Hen Killed the Black Snake, The Heron that Liked Crab-Meat, Numskull and the Rabbit, The Weaver Who Loved a Princess, The Ungrateful Man, Leap and Creep, The Blue Jackal, Passion and the Owl, Ugly's Trust Abused, The Lion and the Carpenter, The Plover Who Fought the Ocean, Shell-Neck Slim and Grim, Forethought Readywit and Fatalist, The Duel Between Elephant and Sparrow, The Shrewd Old Gander, The Lion and the Ram, Smart the Jackal, The Monk Who Left His Body Behind, The Girl Who Married a Snake, Poor Blossom, The Unteachable Monkey, Right-Mind and Wrong-Mind, A Remedy Worse than the Disease, The Mice That Ate Iron, The Results of Education, The Sensible Enemy, The Foolish Friend.

It is the longest of the five books, making up roughly 45% of the work's length.

=== Book 2: Mitra-samprāpti ===
The second treatise is quite different in structure than the remaining books, states Olivelle, as it does not truly embed fables. It is a collection of adventures of four characters: a crow (scavenger, not a predator, airborne habits), a mouse (tiny, underground habits), a turtle (slow, water habits) and a deer (a grazing animal viewed by other animals as prey, land habits). The overall focus of the book is the reverse of the first book. Its theme is to emphasize the importance of friendships, team work, and alliances. It teaches, "weak animals with very different skills, working together can accomplish what they cannot when they work alone", according to Olivelle. United through their cooperation and in their mutual support, the fables describe how they are able to outwit all external threats and prosper.

The second book contains ten fables: The Winning of Friends, The Bharunda Birds, Gold's Gloom, Mother Shandilee's Bargain, Self-defeating Forethought, Mister Duly, Soft, the Weaver, Hang-Ball and Greedy, The Mice That Set Elephant Free, Spot's Captivity.

Book 2 makes up about 22% of the total length.

=== Book 3: Kākolūkīyam ===
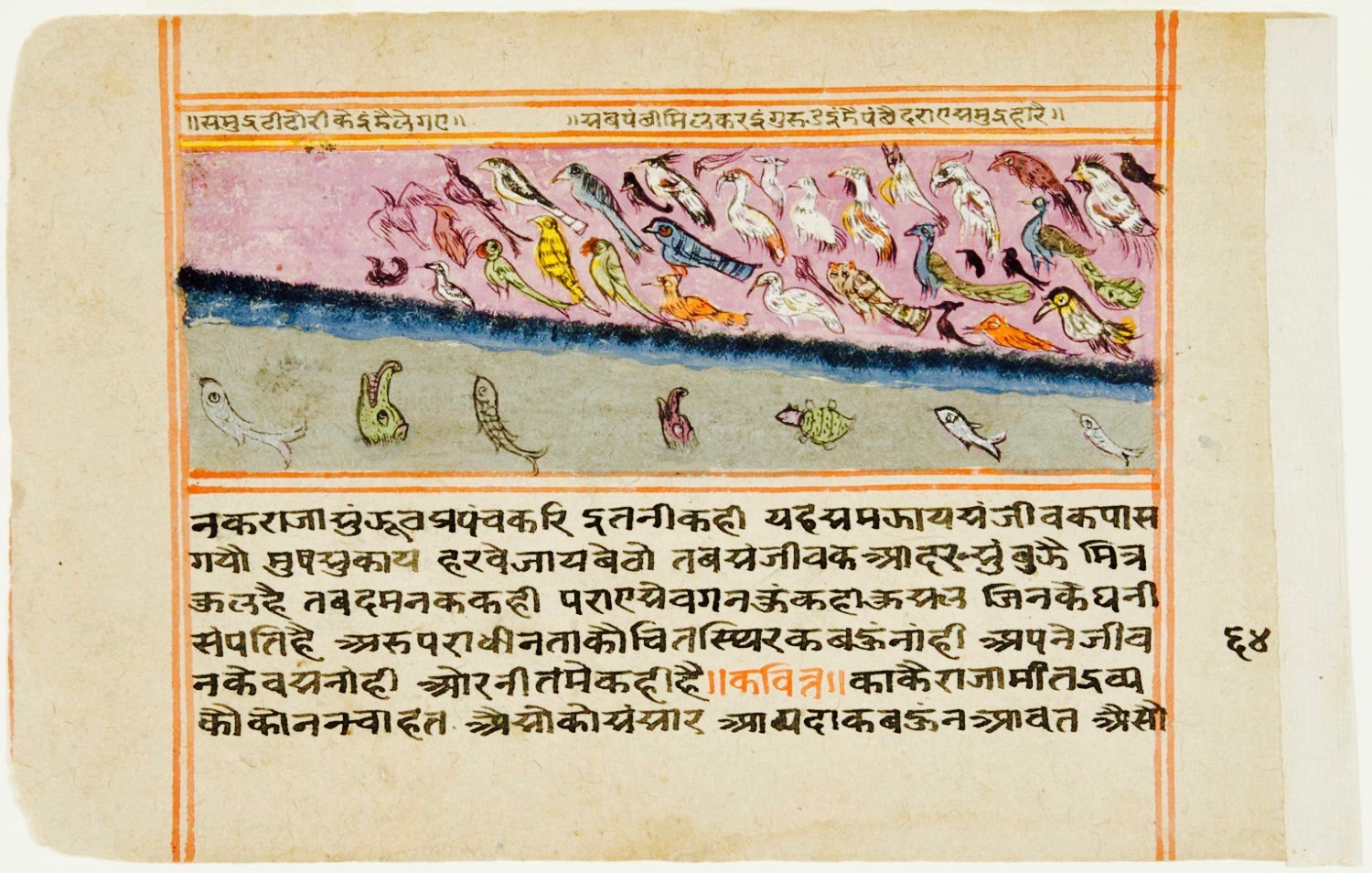
A Panchatantra manuscript page

The third treatise discusses war and peace, presenting through animal characters a moral about the battle of wits being a strategic means to neutralize a vastly superior opponent's army. The thesis in this treatise is that a battle of wits is a more potent force than a battle of swords. The choice of animals embeds a metaphor of a war between good versus evil, and light versus darkness. Crows are good, weaker and smaller in number and are creatures of the day (light), while owls are presented as evil, numerous and stronger creatures of the night (darkness). The crow king listens to the witty and wise counsel of Ciramjivin, while the owl king ignores the counsel of Raktaksa. The good crows win.

The fables in the third book, as well as others, do not strictly limit to matters of war and peace. Some present fables that demonstrate how different characters have different needs and motives, which is subjectively rational from each character's viewpoint, and that addressing these needs can empower peaceful relationships even if they start off in a different way. For example, in the fable The Old Man the Young Wife, the text relates a story wherein an old man marries a young woman from a penniless family. The young woman detests his appearance so much that she refuses to even look at him let alone consummate their marriage. One night, while she sleeps in the same bed with her back facing the old man, a thief enters their house. She is scared, turns over, and for security embraces the man. This thrills every limb of the old man. He feels grateful to the thief for making his young wife hold him at last. The aged man rises and profusely thanks the thief, requesting the intruder to take whatever he desires.

The third book contains eighteen fables in Ryder translation: Crows and Owls, How the Birds Picked a King, How the Rabbit Fooled the Elephant, The Cat's Judgment, The Brahmin's Goat, The Snake and the Ants, The Snake Who Paid Cash, The Unsocial Swans, The Self-sacrificing Dove, The Old Man with the Young Wife, The Brahmin, The Thief and the Ghost, The Snake in the Prince's Belly, The Gullible Carpenter, Mouse-Maid Made Mouse, The Bird with Golden Dung, The Cave That Talked, The Frog That Rode Snakeback, The Butter-blinded Brahmin.

This is about 26% of the total length.

=== Book 4: Labdhapraṇāśam ===
The book four of the Panchatantra is a simpler compilation of ancient moral-filled fables. These, states Olivelle, teach messages such as "a bird in hand is worth two in the bush". They caution the reader to avoid succumbing to peer pressure and cunning intent wrapped in soothing words. The book is different from the first three, in that the earlier books give positive examples of ethical behaviour offering examples and actions "to do". In contrast, book four presents negative examples with consequences, offering examples and actions "to avoid, to watch out for".

The fourth book contains thirteen fables in Ryder translation: Loss of Gains, The Monkey and the Crocodile, Handsome and Theodore, Flop-Ear and Dusty, The Potter Militant, The Jackal Who Killed No Elephants, The Ungrateful Wife, King Joy and Secretary Splendor, The Ass in the Tiger-Skin, The Farmer's Wife, The Pert Hen-Sparrow, How Supersmart Ate the Elephant, The Dog Who Went Abroad.

Book 4, along with Book 5, is very short. Together the last two books constitute about 7% of the total text.

=== Book 5: Aparīkṣitakārakaṃ ===
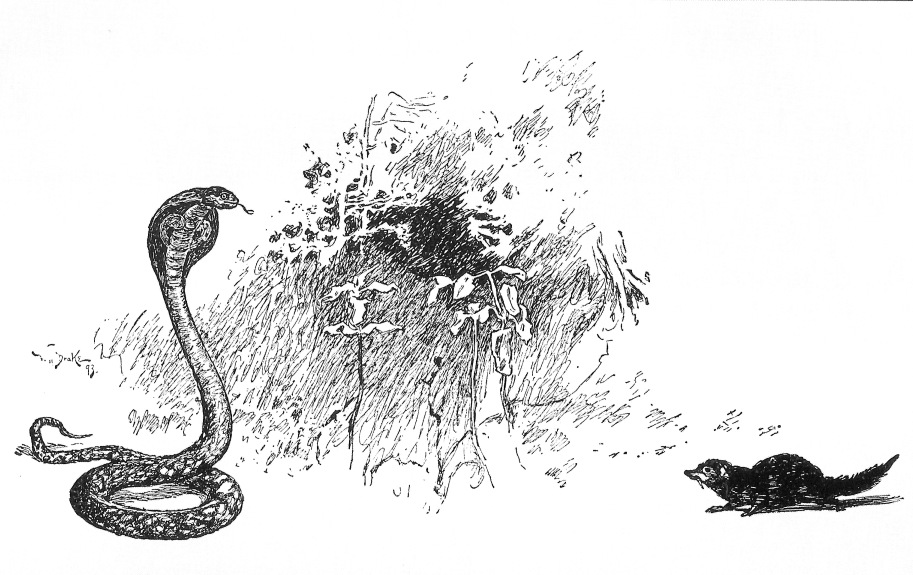
Book 5 of the Panchatantra includes a story about a mongoose and a snake, which was likely an inspiration for the story "Rikki-Tikki-Tavi" by Rudyard Kipling.

Book five of the text is, like book four, a simpler compilation of moral-filled fables. These also present negative examples with consequences, offering examples and actions for the reader to ponder, avoid, and watch out for. The lessons in this last book include "get facts, be patient, don't act in haste then regret later", "don't build castles in the air". The book five is also unusual in that almost all its characters are humans, unlike the first four where the characters are predominantly anthropomorphized animals. According to Olivelle, it may be that the text's ancient author sought to bring the reader out of the fantasy world of talking and pondering animals into the realities of the human world.

The fifth book contains twelve fables about hasty actions or jumping to conclusions without establishing facts and proper due diligence. In Ryder translation, they are: Ill-considered Action, The Loyal Mongoose, The Four Treasure-Seekers, The Lion-Makers, Hundred-Wit Thousand-Wit and Single-Wit, The Musical Donkey, Slow the Weaver, The Brahman's Dream, The Unforgiving Monkey, The Credulous Fiend, The Three-Breasted Princess, The Fiend Who Washed His Feet.

One of the fables in this book is the story of a woman and a mongoose. She leaves her child with a mongoose friend. When she returns, she sees blood on the mongoose's mouth, and kills the friend, believing the animal killed her child. The woman discovers her child alive, and learns that the blood on the mongoose mouth came from it biting the snake while defending her child from the snake's attack. She regrets having killed the friend because of her hasty action.

== Links with other fables ==
The fables of Panchatantra are found in numerous world languages. It is also considered partly the origin of European secondary works, such as folk tale motifs found in Boccaccio, La Fontaine and the works of Grimm Brothers. For a while, this had led to the hypothesis that popular worldwide animal-based fables had origins in India and the Middle East. According to Max Muller,

Sanskrit literature is very rich in fables and stories; no other literature can vie with it in that respect; nay, it is extremely likely that fables, in particular animal fables, had their principal source in India.

— Max Muller, On the Migration of Fables

This monocausal hypothesis has now been generally discarded in favour of polygenetic hypothesis which states that fable motifs had independent origins in many ancient human cultures, some of which have common roots and some influenced by co-sharing of fables. The shared fables implied morals that appealed to communities separated by large distances and these fables were therefore retained, transmitted over human generations with local variations. However, many post-medieval era authors explicitly credit their inspirations to texts such as "Bidpai" and "Pilpay, the Indian sage" that are known to be based on the Panchatantra.

According to Niklas Bengtsson, even though India being the exclusive original source of animal fables is no longer taken seriously, the ancient classic Panchatantra, "which new folklore research continues to illuminate, was certainly the first work ever written down for children, and this in itself means that the Indian influence has been enormous [on fables around the world], not only on the genres of fables and fairy tales, but on those genres as taken up in children's literature". According to Adams and Bottigheimer, the fables of Panchatantra are known in at least 38 languages around the world in 112 versions by Jacob's old estimate, and its relationship with Mesopotamian and Greek fables is hotly debated in part because the original manuscripts of all three ancient texts have not survived. Olivelle states that there are 200 versions of the text in more than 50 languages around the world, in addition to a version in nearly every major language of India.

Scholars have noted the strong similarity between a few of the stories in The Panchatantra and Aesop's Fables. Examples are The Ass in the Panther's Skin and The Ass without Heart and Ears. The Broken Pot is similar to Aesop's The Milkmaid and Her Pail, The Gold-Giving Snake is similar to Aesop's The Man and the Serpent and Le Paysan et Dame serpent by Marie de France (Fables) Other well-known stories include The Tortoise and The Geese and The Tiger, the Brahmin and the Jackal. Similar animal fables are found in most cultures of the world, although some folklorists view India as the prime source.

The French fabulist Jean de La Fontaine acknowledged his indebtedness to the work in the introduction to his Second Fables:

"This is a second book of fables that I present to the public... I have to acknowledge that the greatest part is inspired from Pilpay, an Indian Sage".

The Panchatantra is the origin also of several stories in Arabian Nights, Sindbad, and of many Western nursery rhymes and ballads.

== Origins and function ==
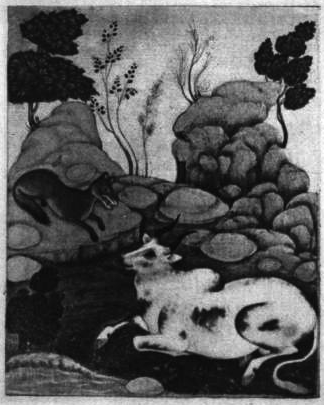
The evil jackal Damanaka meets the innocent bull Sañjīvaka. Indian painting, 1610.

In the Indian tradition, The Panchatantra is a nītiśāstra. Nīti can be roughly translated as "the wise conduct of life" and a śāstra is a technical or scientific treatise; thus it is considered a treatise on political science and human conduct. Its literary sources are "the expert tradition of political science and the folk and literary traditions of storytelling". It draws from the Dharma and Artha śāstras, quoting them extensively. It is also explained that nīti "represents an admirable attempt to answer the insistent question how to win the utmost possible joy from life in the world of men" and that nīti is "the harmonious development of the powers of man, a life in which security, prosperity, resolute action, friendship, and good learning are so combined to produce joy".

The Panchatantra shares many stories in common with the Buddhist Jataka tales, purportedly told by the historical Buddha before his death around 400 BCE. As the scholar Patrick Olivelle writes, "It is clear that the Buddhists did not invent the stories. [...] It is quite uncertain whether the author of [the Panchatantra] borrowed his stories from the Jātakas or the Mahābhārata, or whether he was tapping into a common treasury of tales, both oral and literary, of ancient India." Many scholars believe the tales were based on earlier oral folk traditions, which were finally written down, although there is no conclusive evidence. In the early 20th century, W. Norman Brown found that many folk tales in India appeared to be borrowed from literary sources and not vice versa.

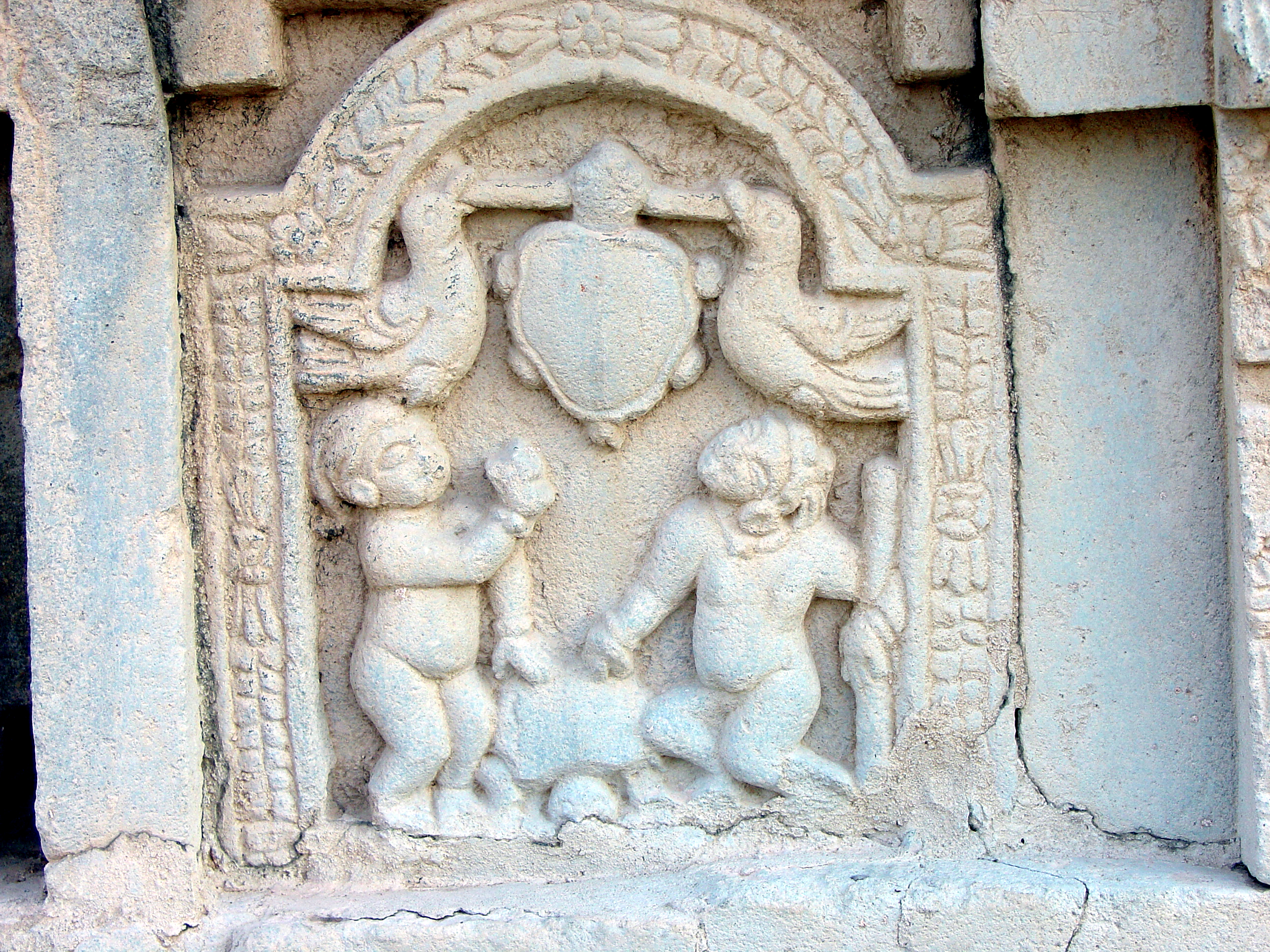
Panchatantra illustration in Nalanda Temple, 7th century CE (Turtle and the Geese)

An early Western scholar who studied The Panchatantra was Dr. Johannes Hertel, who thought the book had a Machiavellian character. Similarly, Edgerton noted that "the so-called 'morals' of the stories have no bearing on morality; they are unmoral, and often immoral. They glorify shrewdness and practical wisdom, in the affairs of life, and especially of politics, of government." Other scholars dismiss this assessment as one-sided, and view the stories as teaching dharma, or proper moral conduct. Also:

On the surface, the Pañcatantra presents stories and sayings which favor the outwitting of roguery, and practical intelligence rather than virtue. However, [...] From this viewpoint the tales of the Pañcatantra are eminently ethical. [...] the prevailing mood promotes an earthy, moral, rational, and unsentimental ability to learn from repeated experience[.]

According to Olivelle, "Indeed, the current scholarly debate regarding the intent and purpose of the 'Pañcatantra' — whether it supports unscrupulous Machiavellian politics or demands ethical conduct from those holding high office — underscores the rich ambiguity of the text". Konrad Meisig states that the Panchatantra has been incorrectly represented by some as "an entertaining textbook for the education of princes in the Machiavellian rules of Arthasastra", but instead it is a book for the "Little Man" to develop "Niti" (social ethics, prudent behaviour, shrewdness) in their pursuit of Artha, and a work on social satire. According to Joseph Jacobs, "... if one thinks of it, the very raison d'être of the Fable is to imply its moral without mentioning it."

The Panchatantra, according to Patrick Olivelle, tells a collection of delightful stories with pithy proverbs, ageless and practical wisdom; one of its appeal and success is that it is a complex book that "does not reduce the complexities of human life, government policy, political strategies, and ethical dilemmas into simple solutions; it can and does speak to different readers at different levels."

The text has been a source of studies on political thought in Hinduism, as well as the management of Artha with a debate on virtues and vices.

=== Metaphors and layered meanings ===
The Sanskrit version of the Panchatantra text gives names to the animal characters, but these names are creative with double meanings. The names connote the character observable in nature but also map a human personality that a reader can readily identify. For example, the deer characters are presented as a metaphor for the charming, innocent, peaceful and tranquil personality who is a target for those who seek a prey to exploit, while the crocodile is presented to symbolize dangerous intent hidden beneath a welcoming ambiance (waters of a lotus flower-laden pond). Dozens of different types of wildlife found in India are thus named, and they constitute an array of symbolic characters in the Panchatantra. Thus, the names of the animals evoke layered meaning that resonates with the reader, and the same story can be read at different levels.

== Cross-cultural migrations ==
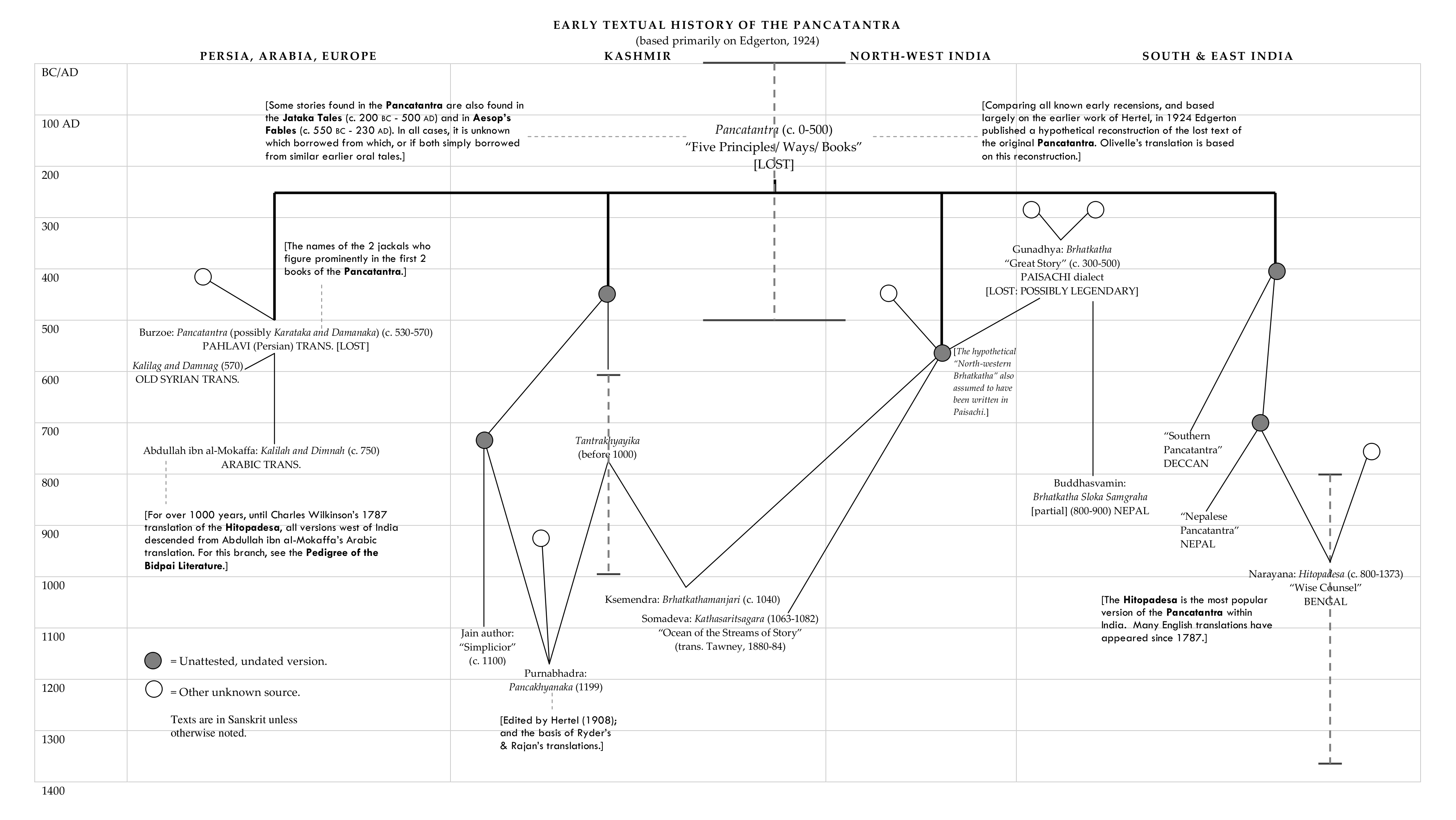
Early history based primarily on Edgerton (1924)

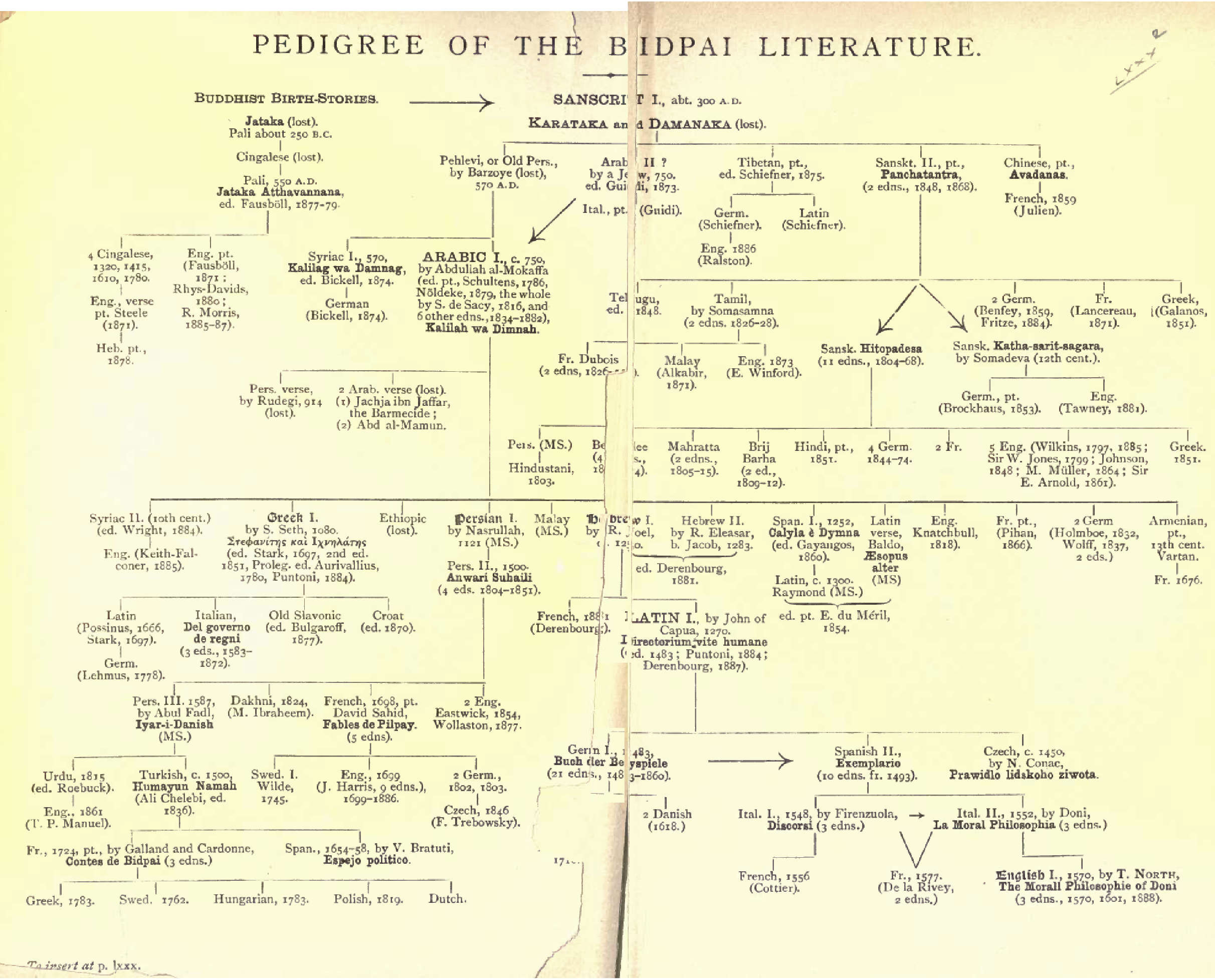
Adaptations and translations from Jacobs (1888); less reliable for early history

The work has gone through many different versions and translations from the sixth century to the present day. The original Indian version was first translated into a foreign language (Pahlavi) by Borzūya in 570 CE, then into Arabic in 750. This Arabic version was translated into several languages, including Syriac, Greek, Persian, Hebrew and Spanish, and thus became the source of versions in European languages, until the English translation by Charles Wilkins of the Sanskrit Hitopadesha in 1787.

=== Early cross-cultural migrations ===
The Panchatantra approximated its current literary form within the 4th–6th centuries CE, though originally written around 200 BCE. No Sanskrit texts before 1000 CE have survived. Buddhist monks on pilgrimage to India took the influential Sanskrit text (probably both in oral and literary formats) north to Tibet and China and east to South East Asia. These led to versions in all Southeast Asian countries, including Tibetan, Chinese, Mongolian, Javanese and Lao derivatives.

=== How Borzuy brought the work from India ===
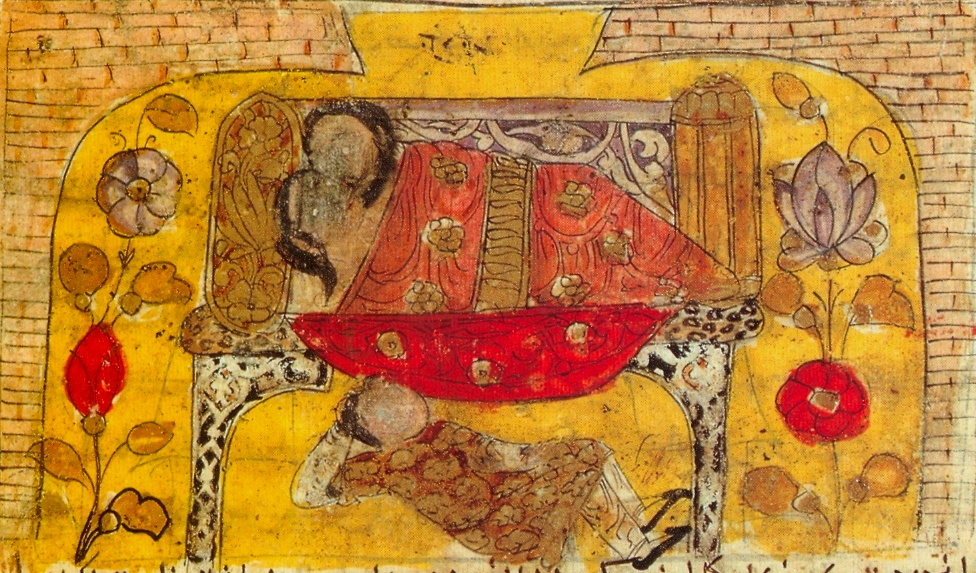
The foolish carpenter of Sarandib, hiding under the bed on which lie his wife and her lover. She notices his foot and contrives a story to prove her innocence. Persian illustration of the Kalileh and Dimneh, 1333.

The Panchatantra also migrated into the Middle East, through Iran, during the Sassanid reign of Anoushiravan. Around 550 CE his notable physician Borzuy (Burzuwaih) translated the work from Sanskrit into the Pahlavi (Middle Persian language). He transliterated the main characters as Karirak ud Damanak.

According to the story told in the Shāh Nāma (The Book of the Kings, Persia's late 10th-century national epic by Ferdowsi), Borzuy sought his king's permission to make a trip to Hindustan in search of a mountain herb he had read about that is "mingled into a compound and, when sprinkled over a corpse, it is immediately restored to life." He did not find the herb, but was told by a wise sage of

"a different interpretation. The herb is the scientist; science is the mountain, everlastingly out of reach of the multitude. The corpse is the man without knowledge, for the uninstructed man is everywhere lifeless. Through knowledge man becomes revivified."

The sage pointed to the book, and the visiting physician Borzuy translated the work with the help of some Pandits (Brahmins). According to Hans Bakker, Borzuy visited the kingdom of Kannauj in north India during the 6th century in an era of intense exchange between Persian and Indian royal courts, and he secretly translated a copy of the text then sent it to the court of Anoushiravan in Persia, along with other cultural and technical knowledge.

=== Kalila wa Demna: Middle Persian and Arabic versions ===
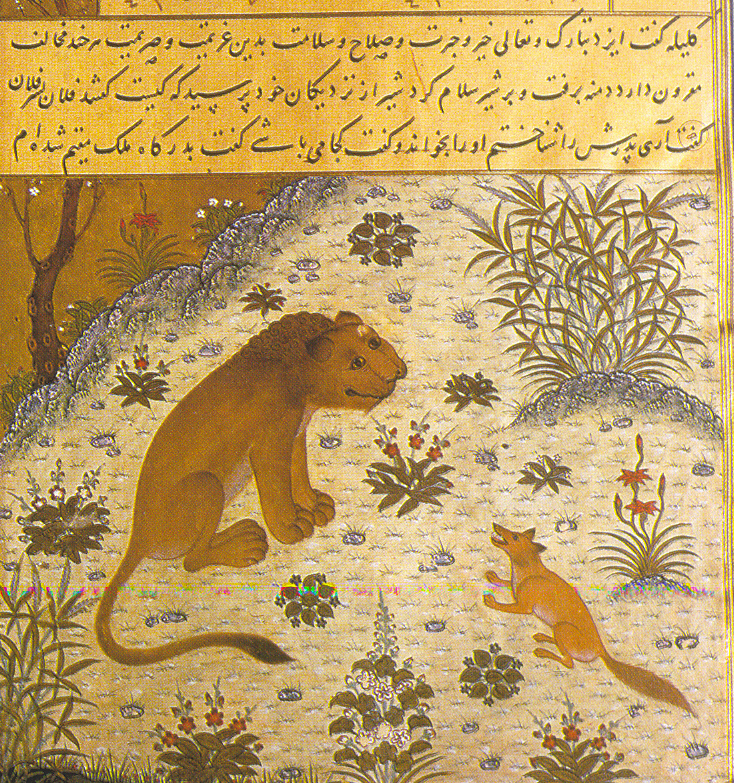
A page from Kelileh o Demneh depicts the jackal-vizier Damanaka ('Victor')/ Dimna trying to persuade his lion-king that the honest bull-courtier, Shatraba(شطربة), is a traitor.

Borzuy's translation of the Sanskrit version into Pahlavi arrived in Persia by the 6th century, but this Middle Persian version is now lost. The book had become popular in Sassanid, and was translated into Syriac and Arabic whose copies survive. According to Riedel, "the three preserved New Persian translations originated between the 10th and 12th century", and are based on the 8th-century Arabic translation by Ibn al-Muqaffa of Borzuy's work on Panchatantra. It is the 8th-century Kalila wa Demna text, states Riedel, that has been the most influential of the known Arabic versions, not only in the Middle East, but also through its translations into Greek, Hebrew and Old Spanish.

The Persian Ibn al-Muqaffa' translated the Panchatantra (in Middle Persian: Kalilag-o Demnag) from Middle Persian to Arabic as Kalīla wa Dimna. This is considered the first masterpiece of "Arabic literary prose."

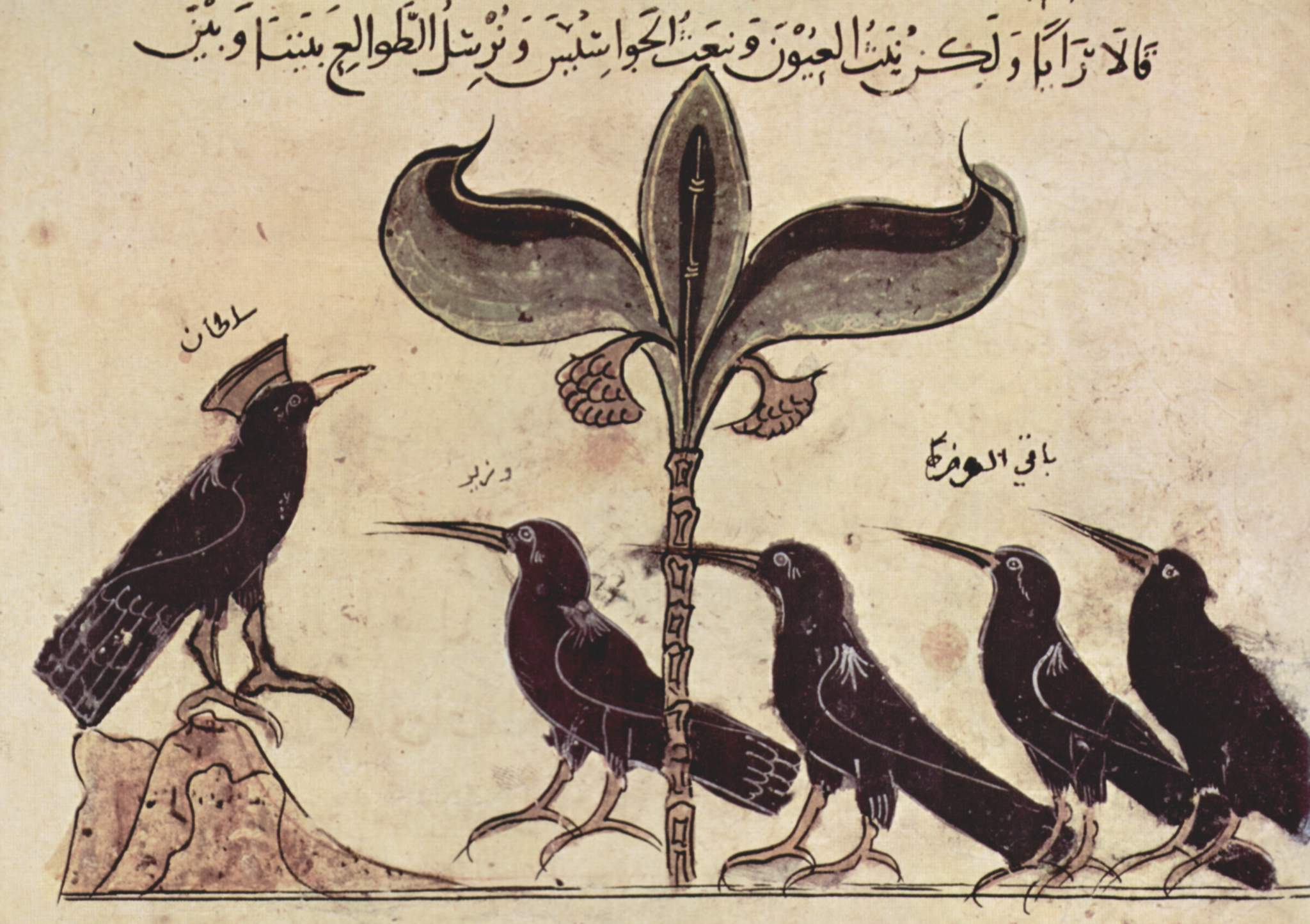
A page from the Arabic version of Kalila wa dimna, dated 1210 CE, illustrating the King of the Crows conferring with his political advisors

The introduction of the first book of Kalila wa Demna is different from Panchatantra, in being more elaborate and instead of king and his three sons studying in the Indian version, the Persian version speaks of a merchant and his three sons who had squandered away their father's wealth. The Persian version also makes an abrupt switch from the story of the three sons to an injured ox, and thereafter parallels the Panchatantra.

The two jackals' names transmogrified into Kalila and Dimna in the Persian version. Perhaps because the first section constituted most of the work, or because translators could find no simple equivalent in Zoroastrian Pahlavi for the concept expressed by the Sanskrit word 'Panchatantra', the jackals' names, Kalila and Dimna, became the generic name for the entire work in classical times.

After the first chapter, Ibn al-Muqaffaʿ inserted a new one, telling of Dimna's trial. The jackal is suspected of instigating the death of the bull "Shanzabeh", a key character in the first chapter. The trial lasts for two days without conclusion, until a tiger and leopard appear to bear witness against Dimna. He is found guilty and put to death.

Ibn al-Muqaffa' inserted other additions and interpretations into his 750CE "re-telling" (see Francois de Blois' Burzōy's voyage to India and the origin of the book Kalīlah wa Dimnah). The political theorist Jennifer London suggests that he was expressing risky political views in a metaphorical way. (Al-Muqaffa' was murdered within a few years of completing his manuscript). London has analysed how Ibn al-Muqaffa' could have used his version to make "frank political expression" at the 'Abbasid court (see J. London's "How To Do Things With Fables: Ibn al-Muqaffa's Frank Speech in Stories from Kalila wa Dimna," History of Political Thought XXIX: 2 (2008)).

=== The Arabic classic by Ibn al-Muqaffa ===
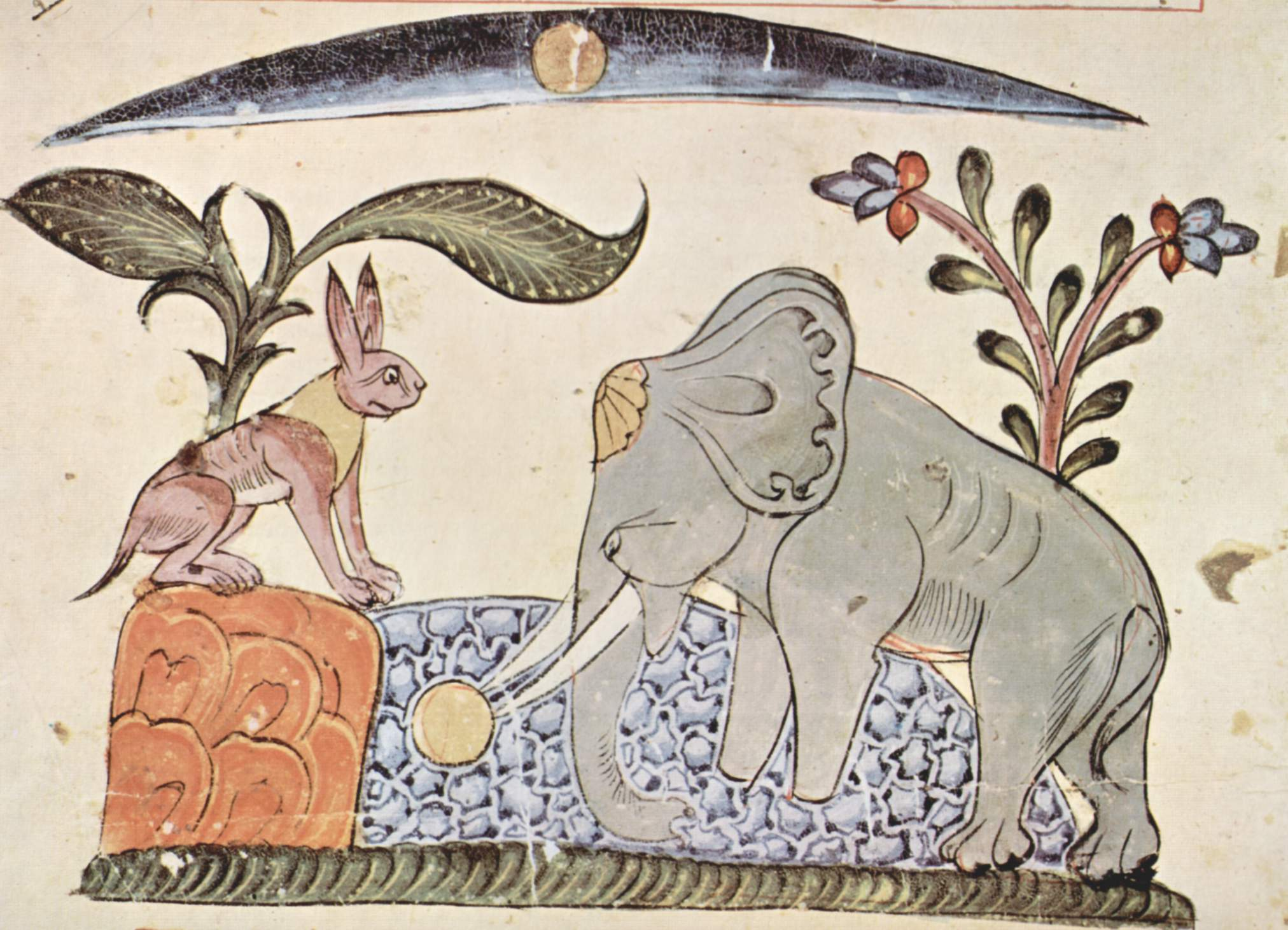
An illustration from a Syrian edition dated 1354. The rabbit fools the elephant king by showing him the reflection of the moon.

Borzuy's 570 CE Pahlavi translation (Kalile va Demne, now lost) was translated into Syriac. Nearly two centuries later, it was translated into Arabic by Ibn al-Muqaffa around 750 CE under the Arabic title, Kalīla wa Dimna. After the Arab invasion of Persia (Iran), Ibn al-Muqaffa's version (two languages removed from the pre-Islamic Sanskrit original) emerged as the pivotal surviving text that enriched world literature. Ibn al-Muqaffa's work is considered a model of the finest Arabic prose style, and "is considered the first masterpiece of Arabic literary prose."

Some scholars believe that Ibn al-Muqaffa's translation of the second section, illustrating the Sanskrit principle of Mitra Laabha (Gaining Friends), became the unifying basis for the Brethren of Purity (Ikwhan al-Safa) — the anonymous 9th-century CE encyclopedists whose prodigious literary effort, Encyclopedia of the Brethren of Sincerity, codified Indian, Persian and Greek knowledge. A suggestion made by Goldziher, and later written on by Philip K. Hitti in his History of the Arabs, proposes that "The appellation is presumably taken from the story of the ringdove in Kalilah wa-Dimnah in which it is related that a group of animals by acting as faithful friends (ikhwan al-safa) to one another escaped the snares of the hunter." This story is mentioned as an exemplum when the Brethren speak of mutual aid in one risaala (treatise), a crucial part of their system of ethics.

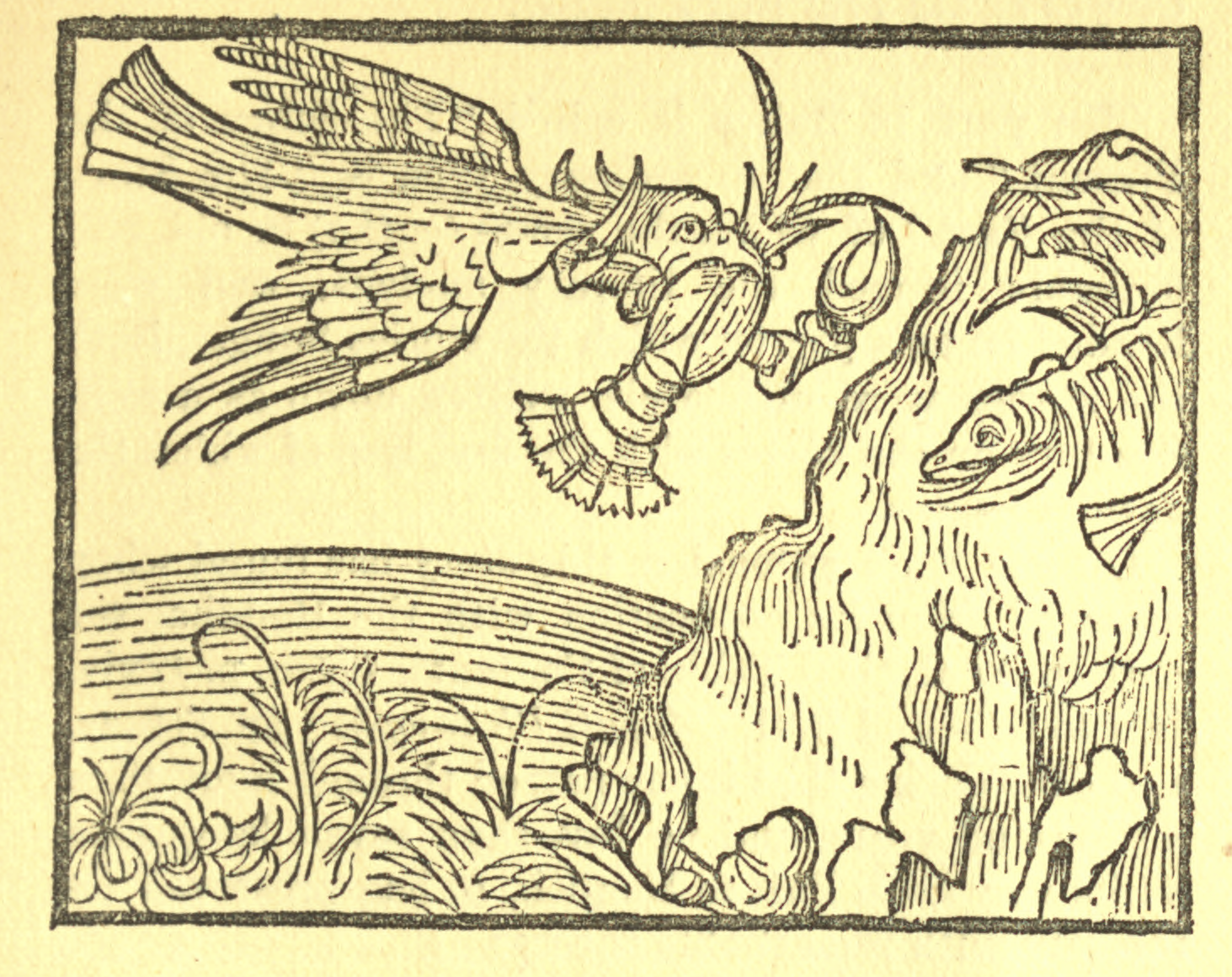
The bird lures fish and kills them, until he tries the same trick with a lobster. Illustration from the editio princeps of the Latin version by John of Capua.

=== Spread to the rest of Europe ===
Almost all pre-modern European translations of the Panchatantra arise from this Arabic version. From Arabic it was re-translated into Syriac in the 10th or 11th century, into Greek (as Stephanites and Ichnelates) in 1080 by the Jewish Byzantine doctor Simeon Seth, into 'modern' Persian by Abu'l-Ma'ali Nasrallah Munshi in 1121, and in 1252 into Spanish (old Castilian, Calila e Dimna).

Perhaps most importantly, it was translated into Hebrew by Rabbi Joel in the 12th century. This Hebrew version was translated into Latin by John of Capua as Directorium Humanae Vitae, or "Directory of Human Life", and printed in 1480, and became the source of most European versions. A German translation, Das Buch der Beispiele, of the Panchatantra was printed in 1483, making this one of the earliest books to be printed by Gutenberg's press after the Bible.

The Latin version was translated into Italian by Anton Francesco Doni in 1552. This translation became the basis for the first English translation, in 1570: Sir Thomas North translated it into Elizabethan English as The Fables of Bidpai: The Morall Philosophie of Doni (reprinted by Joseph Jacobs, 1888). La Fontaine published The Fables of Bidpai in 1679, based on "the Indian sage Pilpay".

== Modern era ==
It was the Panchatantra that served as the basis for the studies of Theodor Benfey, the pioneer in the field of comparative literature. His efforts began to clear up some confusion surrounding the history of the Panchatantra, culminating in the work of Hertel (Hertel 1908, Hertel 1912a, Hertel 1912b, Hertel 1915) and Edgerton (1924). Hertel discovered several recensions in India, in particular the oldest available Sanskrit recension, the Tantrakhyayika in Kashmir, and the so-called North Western Family Sanskrit text by the Jain monk Purnabhadra in 1199 CE that blends and rearranges at least three earlier versions. Edgerton undertook a minute study of all texts which seemed "to provide useful evidence on the lost Sanskrit text to which, it must be assumed, they all go back", and believed he had reconstructed the original Sanskrit Panchatantra; this version is known as the Southern Family text.

Among modern translations, Arthur W. Ryder's translation (Ryder 1925), translating prose for prose and verse for rhyming verse, remains popular. In the 1990s two English versions of the Panchatantra were published, Chandra Rajan's translation (like Ryder's, based on Purnabhadra's recension) by Penguin (1993), and Patrick Olivelle's translation (based on Edgerton's reconstruction of the ur-text) by Oxford University Press (1997). Olivelle's translation was republished in 2006 by the Clay Sanskrit Library.

The novelist Doris Lessing notes in her introduction to Ramsay Wood's 1980 "retelling" of the first two of the five Panchatantra books, that

"... it is safe to say that most people in the West these days will not have heard of it, while they will certainly at the very least have heard of the Upanishads and the Vedas. Until comparatively recently, it was the other way around. Anyone with any claim to a literary education knew that the Fables of Bidpai or the Tales of Kalila and Dimna — these being the most commonly used titles with us — was a great Eastern classic. There were at least twenty English translations in the hundred years before 1888. Pondering on these facts leads to reflection on the fate of books, as chancy and unpredictable as that of people or nations."

== Editions and translations ==
(Ordered chronologically.)

=== Sanskrit texts ===
Critical editions

- Bühler, Georg (1891), Panchatantra: edited, with notes, Bombay. II and III, IV and V
- Hertel, Johannes (1908), The Panchatantra: a collection of ancient Hindu tales, in the recension called Panchakhyanaka, and dated 1199 A.D., of the Jaina monk, Pūrṇabhadra, critically edited in the original Sanskrit (in Nâgarî letters, and, for the sake of beginners, with word-division), Harvard University Press, Harvard Oriental Series Volume 11
- Hertel, Johannes (1912a), The Panchatantra-text of Pūrṇabhadra : critical introduction and list of variants, Harvard Oriental Series Volume 12
- Hertel, Johannes (1912b), The Panchatantra-text of Pūrṇabhadra and its relation to texts of allied recensions as shown in parallel specimens, Harvard Oriental Series Volume 13
- Hertel, Johannes (1915), The Panchatantra: a collection of ancient Hindu tales in its oldest recension, the Kashmirian, entitled Tantrakhyayika, Harvard Oriental Series Volume 14
- Edgerton, Franklin (1924), The Panchatantra Reconstructed (Vol. 1: Text and Critical Apparatus, Vol.2: Introduction and Translation), American oriental series ;v. 2-3, New Haven, Connecticut: American Oriental Series Volumes 2–3
- Edgerton, Franklin (1930). The Pancatantra I–V: the text in its oldest form. Poona: Oriental Book Agency (Poona Oriental Series No. 32). (reprinting in Devanagari only the text from his 1924 work)

Others

- Kāśīnātha Pāṇḍuraṅga Paraba, ed. (1896). The Pañchatantraka of Vishṇusarman. Tukârâm Jâvjî., Google Books
- Pandit Guru Prasad Shastri (1935). Panchatantra with the commentary Abhinavarajalaxmi. Benares: Bhargava Pustakalaya. (Text with Sanskrit commentary)
- Shayamacharan Pandey (1975). Pañcatantram. Vārāṇasī: Motilal Banarsidass. ISBN 9788120821583. (Complete Sanskrit text with Hindi translation)

=== Translations in English ===
The Panchatantra

- Ryder, Arthur W. (transl) (1925), The Panchatantra, University of Chicago Press, ISBN 81-7224-080-5 (also republished in 1956, reprint 1964, and by Jaico Publishing House, Bombay, 1949). The Panchatantra, Columbia University archives; (Translation based on Hertel's text of Purnabhadra's Recension of 1199 CE.)
- Rajan, Chandra (transl.) (1993), Viṣṇu Śarma: The Panchatantra, London: Penguin Books, ISBN 978-0-14-045520-5 (reprint: 1995) (Translation based on Hertel manuscript.)
- Olivelle, Patrick (transl.) (1997), The Pancatantra: The Book of India's Folk Wisdom, Oxford University Press, ISBN 978-0-19-283988-6 (Translation based on Edgerton manuscript.)
- Dharma, Krishna (transl.) (2004). Panchatantra – A vivid retelling of India's most famous collection of fables. Badger CA, USA: Torchlight Publishing. ISBN 978-1-887089-45-6. (Accessible popular compilation derived from a Sanskrit text with reference to the aforementioned translations by Chandra Rajan and Patrick Olivelle.)
- Olivelle, Patrick (2006), The Five Discourses on Worldly Wisdom, Clay Sanskrit Library, ISBN 978-0-8147-6208-0

Kalila and Dimna, Fables of Bidpai and other texts

- Knatchbull, Rev Wyndham (1819), Kalila and Dimna or The Fables of Bidpai, Oxford: W. Baxter for J. Parker Google Books Google Books (translated from Silvestre de Sacy's 1816 collation of different Arabic manuscripts)
- Eastwick, Edward B (transl.) (1854), The Anvari Suhaili; or the Lights of Canopus Being the Persian version of the Fables of Pilpay; or the Book Kalílah and Damnah rendered into Persian by Husain Vá'iz U'L-Káshifí, Hertford: Stephen Austin, Bookseller to the East-India College Also online at Persian Literature in Translation
- Wollaston, Arthur N. (transl.) (1877), The Anwar-I-Suhaili Or Lights of Canopus Commonly Known As Kalilah And Damnah Being An Adaptation By Mulla Husain Bin Ali Waiz-Al-Kashifi of The Fables of Bidapai, London: W H Allen
- Falconer, Ion Keith (1885), Kalilah and Dimnah or The Fables of Bidpai, Cambridge University Press, reprinted by Philo Press, Amsterdam 1970
- Jacobs, Joseph (1888), The earliest English version of the Fables of Bidpai, London Google Books (edited and induced from The Morall Philosophie of Doni by Sir Thomas North, 1570)
- Tales Within Tales – adapted from the fables of Pilpai, Sir Arthur N Wollaston, John Murray, London 1909
- Wilkinson (1930), The Lights of Canopus, London: The Studio Limited
- Wood, Ramsay (1980). Kalila and Dimna, Fables of Bidpai: Books 1 & 2), Introduction by Doris Lessing. New York: Alfred A. Knopf. ISBN 978-0-86356-661-5.
- Wood, Ramsay (1982). Kalila and Dimna: Selected Tales of Bidpai, Introduction by Doris Lessing. London: Granada Publishing Ltd. ISBN 978-0-58608-409-0.
- Wood, Ramsay (1986). Kalila and Dimna: Tales for Kings and Commoners, Selected Fables of Bidpai. Inner Traditions International. ISBN 978-0-89281-114-4.
- Wood, Ramsay (2000). Tales of Kalila and Dimna: Classic Fables from India. Inner Traditions. ISBN 978-0-89281-816-7.
- Wood, Ramsay (2008). Kalila and Dimna, Fables of Friendship and Betrayal (Vol. 1: Books 1 & 2), Introduction by Doris Lessing, Postscript by Dr Christine van Ruymbeke. London: Saqi Books. ISBN 978-0-39450-693-7.
- Wood, Ramsay (2010). Kalila and Dimna, The Panchatantra Retold (Vol. 1: Books 1 & 2), Introduction by Doris Lessing. Noida: Random House India. ISBN 978-8-18400-029-0.
- Wood, Ramsay (2011). Kalila and Dimna, Fables of Conflict and Intrigue (Vol. 2: Books 4 & 5), Introduction by Michael Wood. London: Medina Press. ISBN 978-0-9567081-0-6.
- Ibn al-Muqaffaʿ (2023). Kalila and Dimna: Fables of Virtue and Vice, Translated by Michael Fishbein and James E. Montgomery. Library of Arabic Literature. ISBN 978-1-4798257-7-6.

== See also ==
- Arthashastra
- Calila e Dimna
- Hitopadesha
- Jataka tales
- Katha (storytelling format)
- Kathasaritsagara
- Mirrors for princes
- Wisdom literature
- One Thousand and One Nights
