= Lona Chamarin =

Folk tale

Folk tale
- Name: Lona Chamarin
- Also known as: Lona Chamari
- Mythology: Indian folklore
- Country: India
- Region: Uttar Pradesh, Bihar
- Origin Date: Unknown (oral tradition)
- Published in: Oral tradition
- Related: Indian folklore, Dalit

Lona Chamarin was a tantric, who belonged to the folk traditions of northern India, particularly in parts of Uttar Pradesh and Bihar. She is known primarily through oral narratives, regional songs, and local storytelling traditions rather than written historical sources.

The name "Chamarin" denotes an association with the Chamar community, a historically marginalized community within the Indian caste system. In folklore, Lona Chamarin is often portrayed as a woman who suffered injustice or social oppression.

== See also ==
- Indian folklore
- Dalit
- Chamar
