= Pinglak =

Character in ancient Indian animal fables

Pinglak is a character in Panchatantra. It is a lion which is metaphorically called as Pinglak. It is hypothesis and the story is used to compare the real moral and relevant at present also. Panchatantra, a collection of stories which depict animals in human situations (see anthropomorphism, Talking animals in fiction). In each of the stories, every animal has a "personality" and each story ends in a moral.

The first chapter is termed "Mitrabheda", which means betrayal of friends. This story is about a lion and a bull who became friends. Somehow, a dispute occurred between them and they both fought. Finally, one of them died.

== Story ==
Pinglak is a lion in the story. Sanjeewak was a bull who, because of his incapabilities and illness was discarded by his master and was left alone in a jungle, where he sat on the bank of Yamuna river and grew stronger. Once, the king of the jungle, the lion named Pinglak came near the bank of river to quench his thirst, but when he listened to the threatening sound of Sanjeewak, he hid himself under a tree. The lion had two cunning jackal ministers named Karkat and Damnak. When they saw lion threatened, Damnak went to Sanjeewak and somehow managed to bring friendship between Pinglak and Sanjeewak. The lion indulged so deeply in the friendship that he left his entire kingship. When all the animals in the jungle felt insecure due to this, then the jackals again managed to create differences between Pinglak and Sanjeewak. And finally, in a fight between the lion and the bull, the bull gets killed. These characters are in story of * Mitra-bheda: The Separation of Friends (The Lion and the Bull) is one of the five books.

Its original Indian version is Mitra-bheda, The Separation of Friends. In the first story, a friendship arises between the lion Piṅgalaka, the king of the forest, and Sañjīvaka, a bull. Karataka ('Horribly Howling') and Damanaka ('Victor') are two jackals that are retainers to the lion king. Against Karataka's advice, Damanaka breaks up the friendship between the lion and the bull out of jealousy. This book contains around thirty stories, mostly told by the two jackals. It is the longest of the five books, making up roughly 45% of the work's length.

== See also ==
- List of Panchatantra Stories
