= Khol Hi-Raitan Wildlife Sanctuary =

Protected area in Haryana, India

- IUCN category IV (habitat/species management area)
- Location within Haryana Location within India
- Interactive map of Khol Hi-Raitan Wildlife Sanctuary
- Location: Panchkula district, Haryana, India
- Coordinates: 30.76°N 76.90°E
- Area: 0.5
- Established: 2004
- Governing body: Forests Department, Haryana
- Website: www.haryanaforest.gov.in

Khol Hi-Raitan Wildlife Sanctuary is situated in Panchkula district of Haryana State, India. It is 0.5 kilometres (0.31 mi) away from Panchkula on the Morni Road and its aerial distance from the Bir Shikargah Wildlife Sanctuary is only 3 kilometres (1.9 mi).

== History ==
Forests Department, Haryana of Government of Haryana officially notified this as Wildlife Sanctuary on 10 December 2004.

== Area ==
It is spread over an area of 4883 (2226.58 and 2656.38) hectares. In addition, there is 1320 hectares Eco-sensitive zone around the sanctuary.

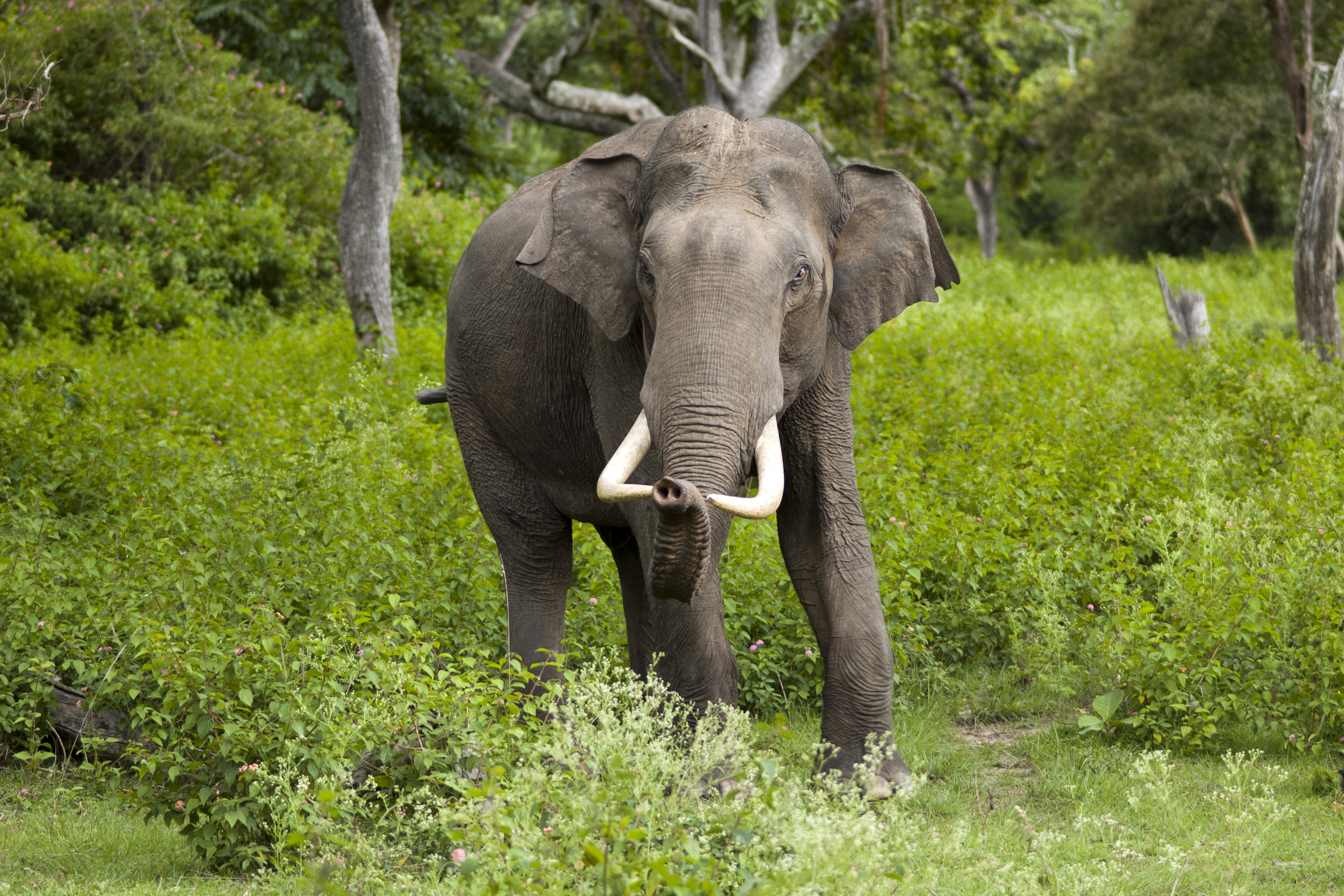
Asiatic elephant is found at Kalesar

== Animals ==
Khol Hi-Raitan Wildlife Sanctuary and Bir Shikargah Wildlife Sanctuary are only 3 kilometres (1.9 mi) aerial distance from each other, both are also only few km away from Kalesar National Park, all of which lie in the Shivalik hills of Haryana. All these three sanctuaries have similar species of wild animal that migrate from century to another. The wild species include Indian leopard, Asiatic elephant, Chital (spotted deer), Sambar deer, Wild boar, Rhesus macaque, Gray langur, Striped hyena, Indian jackal, Jungle cat, Indian gray mongoose, Indian fox and Indian jackal.

== Nearby attractions ==
- Kalesar National Park (Map) - It is 15 kilometres (9.3 mi) from Yamunanagar on Chhachhrauli road, it has elephant, wild boar, sambhar, hare, red junglefowl, porcupine, monkey, chital.
- Bir Shikargah Wildlife Sanctuary (Map) Panchkula district - It covers an area of 767.30 hectares (1,896.0 acres). It is 8 kilometres (5.0 mi) from Pinjore on Mallah road and 30 kilometres (19 mi) from Chandigarh.

== See also ==
- List of National Parks & Wildlife Sanctuaries of Haryana, India
- Haryana Tourism
- List of Monuments of National Importance in Haryana
- List of State Protected Monuments in Haryana
- List of Indus Valley Civilization sites in Haryana, Punjab, Rajasthan, Gujarat, India & Pakistan
