= Folklore of India =

Local tales and legends from India

The folklore of India encompasses the folklore of the Republic of India and the Indian subcontinent. India is an ethnically and religiously diverse country. This generally refers to the religious traditions of the people of the country, but also includes the native folktales and mythos of various other ethnic and religious groups of India. Such as Hindu mythology, Dravidian folk religion, Tamil mythology, Buddhist mythology and Vedic mythology.

Folk religion syncretism and assimilation in Hinduism explains the rationale behind local religious practices and contains local myths that explain the customs and rituals. A lot of Indian folklore has survived as a result of oral transmission.

== Folk art of India ==
The folk and tribal arts of India speak volumes about the country's rich heritage. Art forms in India have been exquisite and explicit. Folk art forms include various schools of art like the Mughal School, Rajasthani School, Nakashi art school etc. Each school has its distinct style of colour combinations or figures and its features. Other popular folk art forms include Madhubani paintings, Bhojpuri paintings from Bihar, Kangra painting from Himachal Pradesh and Warli painting from Maharashtra. Tanjore paintings from South India incorporate real gold into their paintings. Local fairs, festivals, deities and heroes (warriors) play a vital role in this art form. In history, these arts were made by the upper caste but now they are famous worldwide.

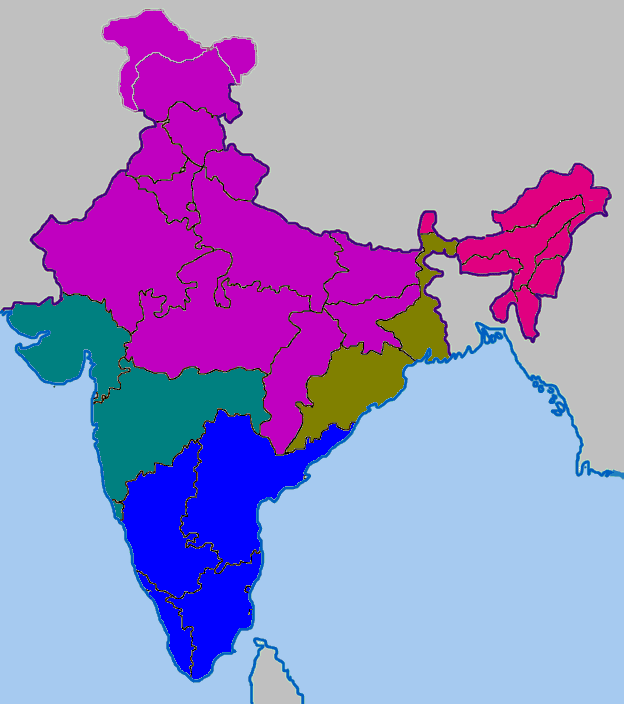
The culture of India, broken down into five main geographical regions

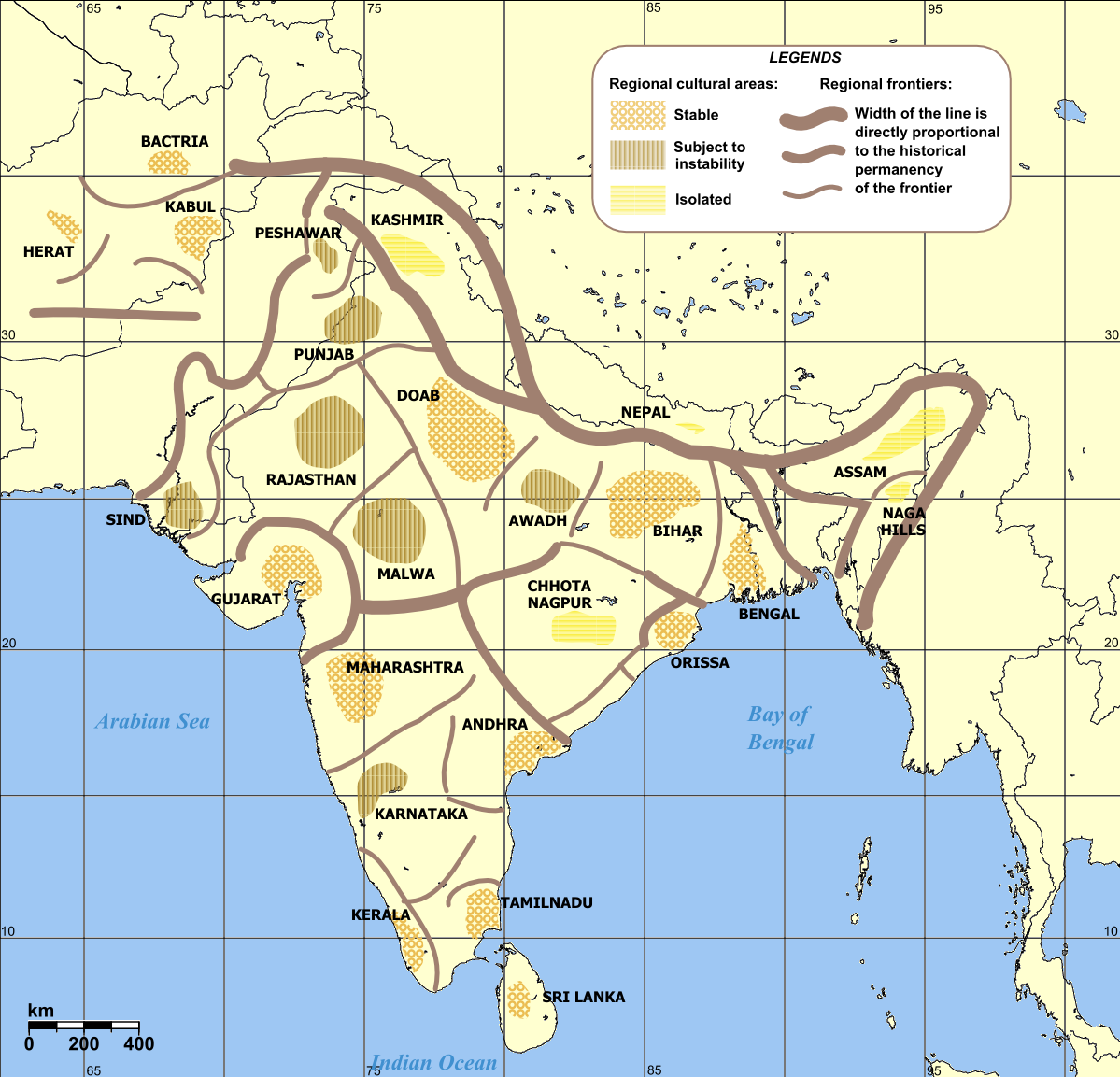
Map illustrating regional cultural frontiers and areas, and their stability and historical permanency

Some famous folk and tribal arts of India include:

- Tanjore painting
- Madhubani painting
- Bhojpuri Paintings
- Nirmal paintings
- Warli folk painting
- Pattachitra painting
- Rajasthani miniature painting
- Kalamezhuthu

== Folktales of India ==
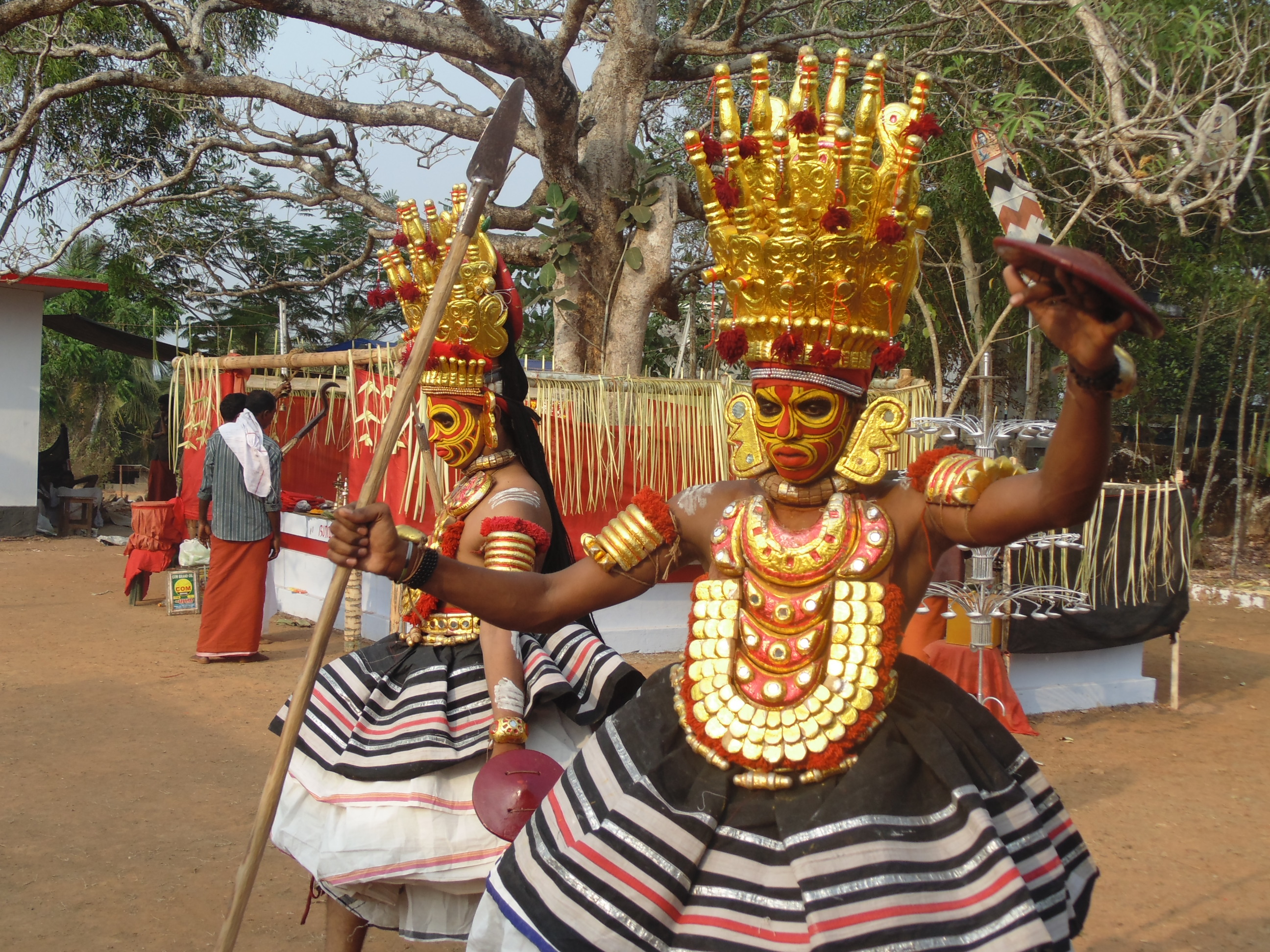
Thirayattam (Karumakan Vallattu)

India possesses a large body of heroic ballads and epic poetry preserved in oral tradition, both in Sanskrit and the various vernacular languages of India. One such oral epic is the story of Pabuji, collected by Dr. John Smith from Rajasthan. It is a long poem in the Rajasthani language, traditionally told by professional storytellers known as Bhopas, who deliver it in front of a tapestry that depicts the characters of the story, and functions as a portable temple, accompanied by a ravanhattho fiddle. The title character was a historical figure, a Rajput prince, who has been deified in Rajasthan.

Various performing arts such as Garba and Dandiya Raas of Gujarat, Sambalpuri dance of Odisha, the Chhau, Alkap and Gambhira of West Bengal, Bihu dance of Assam, Ghoomar dance of Rajasthan and Haryanvi, Bhangra and Gidda of Punjab, Dhangar of Goa, Panthi dance of Chhattisgarh, Tamasha and Lavani of Maharashtra,Kummi, and Karagattam of Tamil Nadu, Kolattam of Andhra Pradesh, Yakshagana of Karnataka, Thirayattam of Kerala and Chang Lo of Nagaland derive their elements from myriads of myths, folktales and seasonal changes.

Noteworthy collections of Indian traditional stories include the Panchatantra, a collection of traditional narratives made by Vishnu Sarma in the second century BC. The Hitopadesha of Narayana is a collection of anthropomorphic fabliaux, animal fables, in Sanskrit, compiled in the ninth century.

Indian folklorists during the last thirty years have substantially contributed to the study of folklore, such as Devendra Satyarthi, Krishna Dev Upadyhayaya, Prafulla Dutta Goswami, Kunja Bihari Dash, Ashutosh Bhatacharya and many more senior folklorists. During the 1970s, some folklorists studied in US universities and trained up themselves with modern theories and methods of folklore research and set a new trend of folklore study in India, especially South Indian universities, which advocated for folklore as a discipline in the universities. Amongst the hundreds of scholars trained on folklore, A.K. Ramanujan is one such person to analyse folklore from the Indian context.

Study of folklore was strengthened by two stremas (sicsic); one is Finnish folklorist Lauri Honko and another is Peter J. Claus of American folklore. These two folklorists conducted their field work on Epic of Siri and led the Indian folklorists to the new folklore study. The Central Institute of Indian Languages has played a major role in promoting folklore studies in India to explore another reality of Indian culture.

Recently, scholars such as Chitrasen Pasayat, M. D. Muthukumaraswamy, Vivek Rai, Jawaharlal Handoo, Birendranath Dutta, P. C. Pattanaik, B. Reddy, Sadhana Naithani, P. Subachary, Molly Kaushal, Shyam Sundar Mahapatra and Bhabagrahi Mishra have contributed in their respective field for shaping folklore study as a strong discipline in representing the people's memory and their voice. Recently, the National Folklore Support Center in Chennai has taken the initiative to promote folklore in public domain and bridging the gap of academic domain and community domain.

== Indian folk heroes, villains, and tricksters ==
Indian folk heroes include heroes like Rama (from the Ramayana) and Krishna (from the Mahabharata). They are well known across the country, and are traditionally deified. Each ethnic community has its own folk heroes.The Santhals have their culture heroes, namely, Beer Kherwal and Bidu Chandan. Gonds have their folk hero named Chital Singh Chhatti. A Banjara folk hero is Lakha Banjara or Raja Isalu. Banjara epics often have female protagonists.

Oral epics often have sub-regional folk variations, wherein the events are different from the mainstream story. Folk heroes are sometimes deified and are worshipped in the village. There is a thin difference of a mythic hero and romantic hero in Indian folklore. In Kalahandi, oral epics are available among the ethnic singers, performed in ritual context and social context. Extensive study of different folk and tribal forms of Jatra, like Dhanu jatra and the Sulia jatra have been made and the 'hero characters', who have become local deities in many cases, have been examined.

Indian oral epics are found abundantly, with many castes having their own oral ballads. Extensive field work and research has been done on the Epic of Siri, a Tulu-language poem. Many Indian ethnic groups have their own epics, and many such as Tulu epics and the Pabuji epic have gained wider readership due to English translations being published.

In the rural areas of Kerala, there was a practice known as Odiyan (or "odian") where a group of individuals claimed the ability to induce fear in people to the point of death using a technique called otiviki. Odiyan is a legendary figure in Kerala folklore, described as half-man, half-beast creatures that would lurk in alleyways during the night. These Odiyans would apply specific herbs to certain parts of their bodies, chant spells, and transform themselves into various animals like bulls, buffaloes, or foxes, depending on their desire.

== Cultural archetypes and icons ==
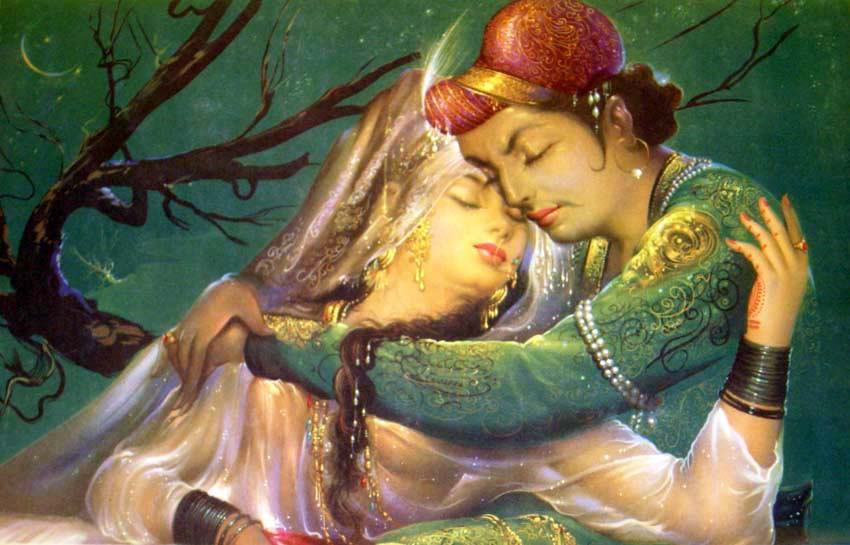
Jahangir and Anarkali

- Ahimsa
- Bhajan
- Bhakti
- Curry
- Dharma
- Gandhian
- Ganges
- Gurukula
- Guru
- Hindu undivided family
- Karma
- Mahout
- Masala (film genre)
- Puja (Buddhism)
- Puja (Hinduism)
- Sadhu
- Snake charmer
- Taj Mahal
- Yoga
- Yakshi
- kirtan

== Traditional games of India ==
India has a long history of board games. You hear about these from the times of the Mahabharata and the Mughal empire. Some of the popular board games that originated from Indian Traditional games include Chess (Chaturanga), Ludo (Pachisi) and Snakes and Ladders (Moksha-Patamu).

Recently, Odisha, a state in eastern India, introduced a child-friendly programme called Srujan (creativity) in the primary schools. About 18 million children took part in four activities like story telling activities, traditional games, traditional art and craft, music, dance and riddles over a period of three years (2007–2010). The result is that while there are hundreds of varieties of folktales, the varieties of traditional games are limited. About three hundred traditional games both indoor and outdoor were commonly played and it was found that these traditional games contains mathematical knowledge (like counting, measurement, shapes and size, geometrical ideas and finally socialization through action). The traditional games are the best ways of teaching and learning. When these are applied in the primary schools, many teachers revealed that children know many games that the teachers have forgotten.

Indoor board game like "Kasadi" (a wooden board with 14 pits played with tamarind seed by two or more than two girls in the domestic domain) was most popular and it is still not vanished from the society. Dr Mahendra Kumar Mishra, a folklorist and an educator, has collected these games and has documented in video form. Another games in the domestic domain is the goat and the tiger and ganjifa. These were the forerunners of the card games of today. Ganjifa used to be circular painted stack of card like things which were played using certain rules.

== Indian folklorists ==
The scientific study of Indian folklore was slow to begin: early collectors felt far freer to creatively reinterpret source material and collected their material with a view to the picturesque rather than the representative.

A. K. Ramanujan's theoretical and aesthetic contributions span several disciplinary areas. Context-sensitivity is a theme that appears not only in Ramanujan's cultural essays, but also appears in his writing about Indian folklore and classic poetry. In "Where Mirrors are Windows," (1989) and "Three Hundred Ramayanas" (1991), he discusses the intertextual nature of Indian literature, both written and oral. He says, "What is merely suggested in one poem may become central in a 'repetition' or an 'imitation' of it". His essay "Where Mirrors Are Windows: Toward an Anthology of Reflections" (1989), his commentaries in The Interior Landscape: Love Poems from a Classical Tamil Anthology (1967) and Folktales from India, Oral Tales from Twenty Indian Languages (1991) are good examples of his work in Indian folklore studies.

Rudyard Kipling was interested in folklore, dealing with English folklore in works such as Puck of Pook's Hill and Rewards and Fairies. His experiences in India led him to also create similar works with Indian themes. Kipling spent a great deal of his life in India and was familiar with the Hindi language. His works such as the two Jungle Books contain a lot of stories that are written after the manner of traditional folktales. Indian themes also appear in his Just So Stories, and many of the characters bear recognisable names from Indian languages. During the same period, Helen Bannerman penned the now notorious Indian-themed tale of Little Black Sambo, which represented itself to be an Indian folktale.

After independence, disciplines and methods from anthropology began to be used in the creation of more in-depth surveys of Indian folklore.

Folklorists of India can be broadly divided into three phases. Phase I was the British Administrators who collected the local knowledge and folklore to understand the subjects they want to rule. Phase II were the missionaries who wanted to acquire the language of the people to recreate their religious literature for evangelical purpose. Phase III was the post-independent period in the country where many universities, institutes and individuals started studying the folklore. The purpose was to search the national identity through legends, myths and epics. In the course of time, Academic institutions and universities in the country started opening departments on folklore in their respective regions, more in south India to maintain their cultural identity and also maintain language and culture.

After independence, scholars like Dr Satyendra, Devendra Satyarthi, Krishnadev Upadhayaya, Jhaberchand Meghani, Prafulla Dutta Goswami, Ashutosh Bhattacharya, Kunja Bihari Dash, Chitrasen Pasayat, Somnath Dhar, Ramgarib Choubey, Jagadish Chandra Trigunayan were the pioneer in working on folklore. Of course, the trend was more literary than analytical. It was during the 1980s that the central Institute of Indian Languages and the American Institute of Indian Studies started their systemic study on folklore. After that, many Western—as well as Eastern—scholars pursued their studies on folklore as a discipline.

The pioneer of the folklorists in contemporary India includes Jawaharlal Handoo, Sadhana Naithani, Kishore Bhattacharjee, Kailash Patnaik, VA Vivek Rai, late Komal Kothari, Raghavan Payanad, M Ramakrishnan, Nandini Sahu.M.N. and Venkatesha. An emerging trend of folklorists has emerged wherein they are committed to understanding folklore from an Indian point of view than to see the whole subjects from the Western model. Some of them are better to understand folklore from the folklore provider and consultants who are the creator and consumers of folklore. The user of folklore knows what folklore is since their use folklore with purpose and meaning. But theoreticians see folklore from their theoretical angle. From an ethics point of view, folklorist should learn from the folk as practicable as possible and folk should give the hidden meaning of folklore to the folklorist so that both of their interpretation can help to give a new meaning to the item of folklore and explore the possibility of use of folklore in the new socio-cultural domain.

Dr Mahendra Kumar Mishra from Kalahandi, Odisha has substantially contributed to the tribal folklore of Middle India and Odisha. His seminal book Oral Epics of Kalahandi has been translated into Chinese and Finnish. He has written Saora folk literature, Paharia Folkliterature, Visioning Folklore and Oral Poetry of Kalahandi. His recent seminal work is three oral Ramakatha in tribal oral tradition. Dr Mishra has written five books on folklore theory and research methodology adopting the folklore of western Odisha and Chhattisgarh. The analytical work of Dr Mishra has been widely studied in the western and eastern world as a part of South Asian folklore.

The National Folklore Support Center, Chennai in the last ten years, has created a space for new scholars who are pursuing the study of folklore with their commitment. Folklore is no longer confined to academic study;, rather, it has once again found its space within and among the folk to get their true meaning.

Dr.Raghavanvpayyanad plays a major role in Indian folklore study. He has written many books on the subject while also being an international representative of Indian folkloristics—both in English and Malayalam.

== Folk songs and folk music ==
India has a rich and varied tradition of folk music and numerous types of folk songs. Some traditional folk song genres have been recognized as Intangible Cultural Heritage listed by UNESCO. Among these traditions, a well-known musical and religious repertoire is known as Baul, which has become famous in the World Music scene. Among the most respected historical figures of the Baul tradition, Lalon Fakir and Bhaba Pagla are often mentioned.

Santali Sohrai folk song

== See also ==
- Tamasha
- Hindu deities
- Meitei deities
- Meitei mythology
- Hindu mythology
- Vedic mythology
- Proto-Indo-Iranian religion
- Hindu texts
- Indian epic poetry
- List of Hindu deities
- Ramayana
- Mahabharata
- Puranas
- Khamba Thoibi Sheireng, Khamba and Thoibi
- Numit Kappa
- Helloi

== Bibliography ==
- Bansal, Sunita Pant (2005). Hindu Gods and Goddesses. New Delhi, India: Smriti Books. p. 79. ISBN 81-87967-72-2.
- Datta, Bīrendranātha (2002). Folklore and historiography. Vijayanagar, Velachery, Chennai, India: National Folklore Support Center. p. 132. ISBN 81-901481-1-7.
