= Subhumid temperate climate =

Climate subtype in the Köppen climate classification system

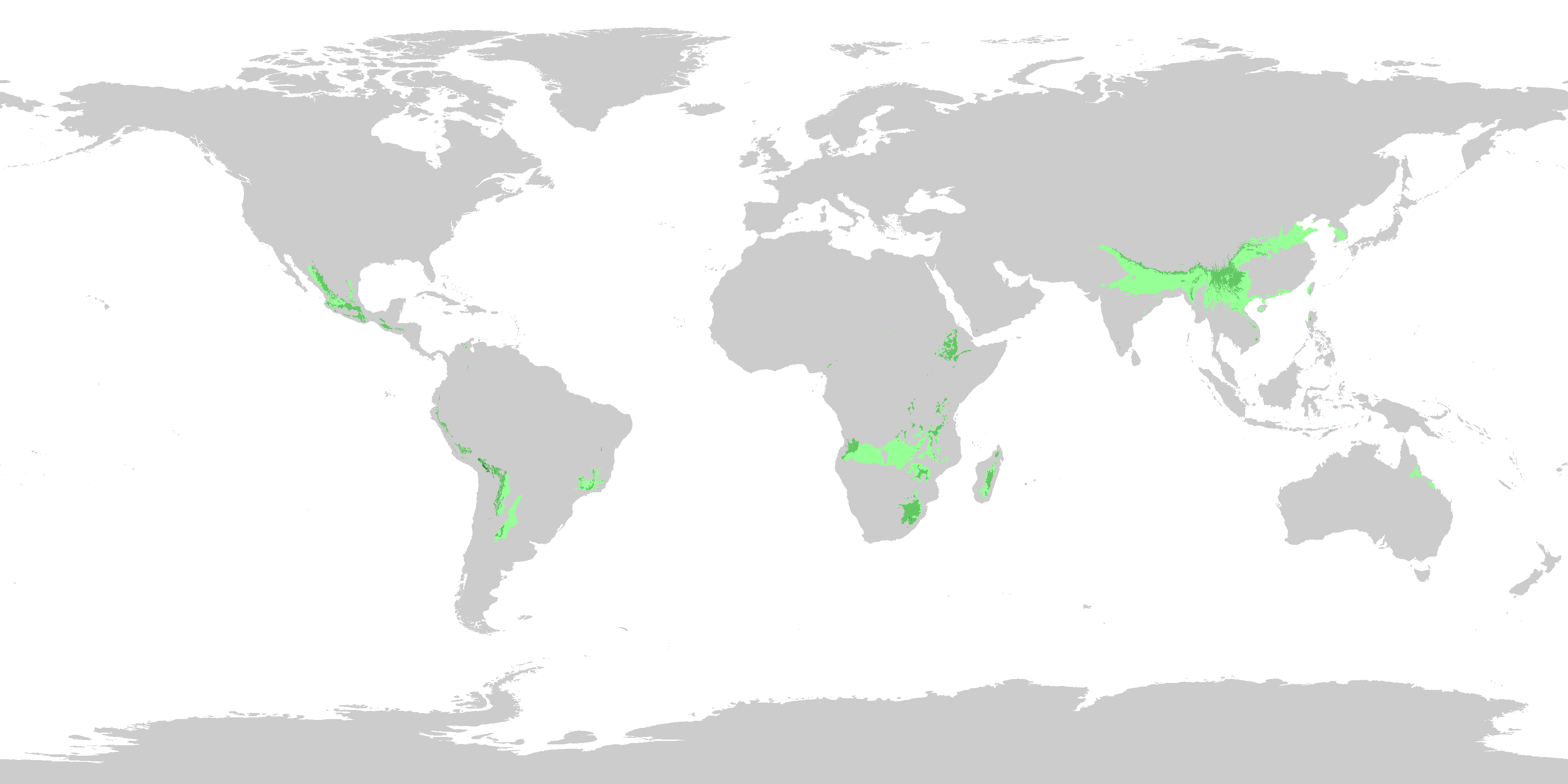
Distribution in the world as of 1991-2020, using a threshold of −3 °C (27 °F) for the coldest month. Cwa Cwb Cwc

The subhumid temperate climate also called monsoon temperate climate, is a temperate climate sub-type with monsoon influence, that is a climate with dry winter and wet summer. Although the terms subhumid temperate climate and monsoon temperate climate are not officially used in the Köppen climate classification, climates of this type may fall under the Cw classification for dry winters.

== Sub-types ==
New Delhi, India

Climate chart (precipitation, max. and min. temperature)
J	F	M	A	M	J	J	A	S	O	N	D
19 20 8	21 24 11	17 30 16	16 37 21	31 40 26	74 39 28	210 36 28	233 34 27	124 34 25	15 33 20	6 28 13	8.1 23 8
- █ Average max. and min. temperatures in °C
- █ Precipitation totals in mm
Imperial conversion
J	F	M	A	M	J	J	A	S	O	N	D
0.8 68 46	0.8 76 51	0.7 86 60	0.6 98 70	1.2 104 78	2.9 102 82	8.3 96 82	9.2 94 80	4.9 93 77	0.6 91 67	0.2 83 55	0.3 73 47
- █ Average max. and min. temperatures in °F
- █ Precipitation totals in inches

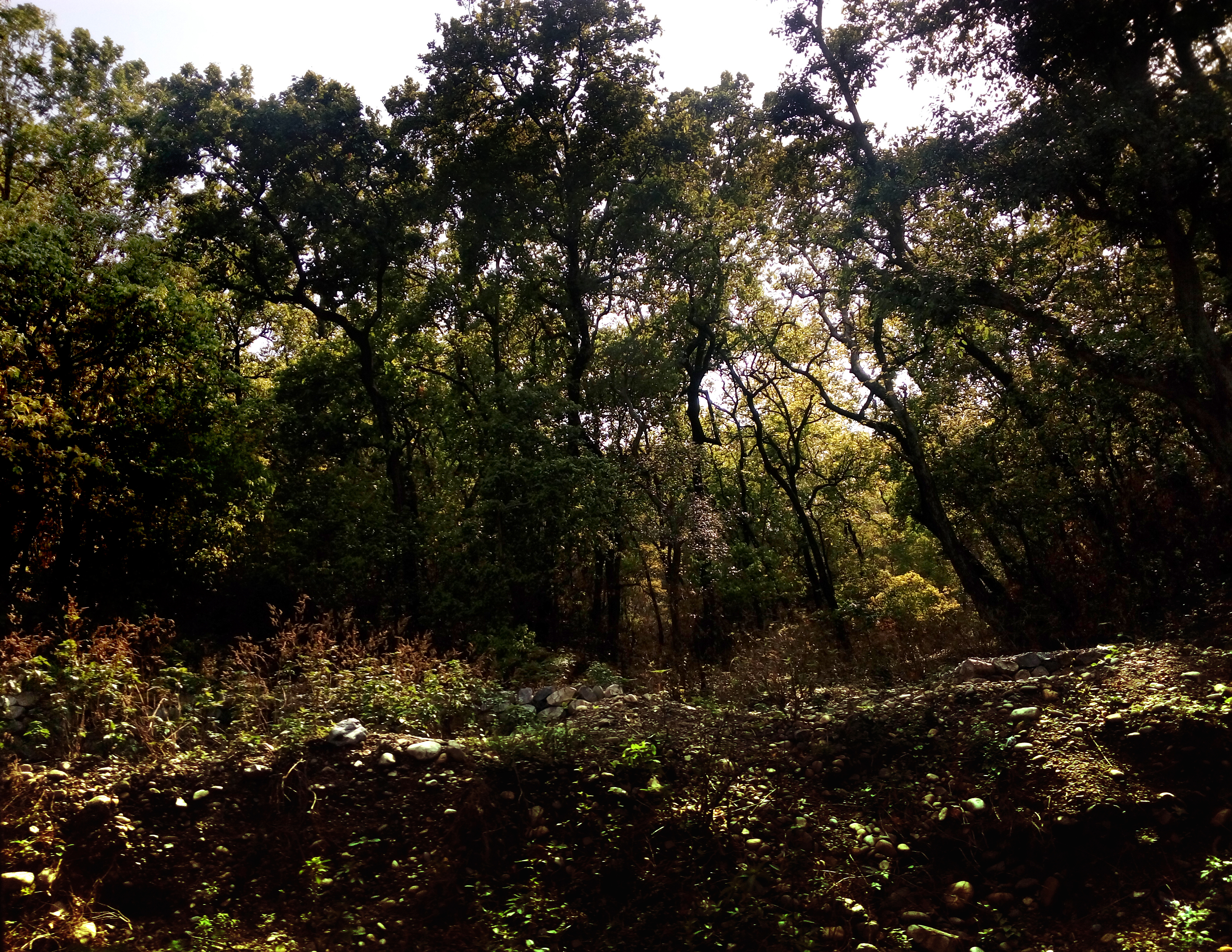
Kalesar National Park in India with Cwa climate

=== Subtropical monsoon climate ===
A Subtropical monsoon climate, officially classified as a Subhumid subtropical climate or Monsoon-influenced humid subtropical climate under the Köppen classification (Cwa), has a hot summer. This climate is extensively present in South and Southeast Asia, mainly North India, Southern China, Myanmar and Nepal and Southern Africa, Zambia and Angola; it can also be found in South America, isolated zones of Bolivia, Brazil and Argentina. It also occurs in parts of tropical highlands of São Paulo state, Mato Grosso do Sul and near the Andean highland in northwestern Argentina. These highland areas feature summer temperatures that are warm enough to fall outside the subtropical highland climate category Cwb.

=== Subtropical highland climate ===
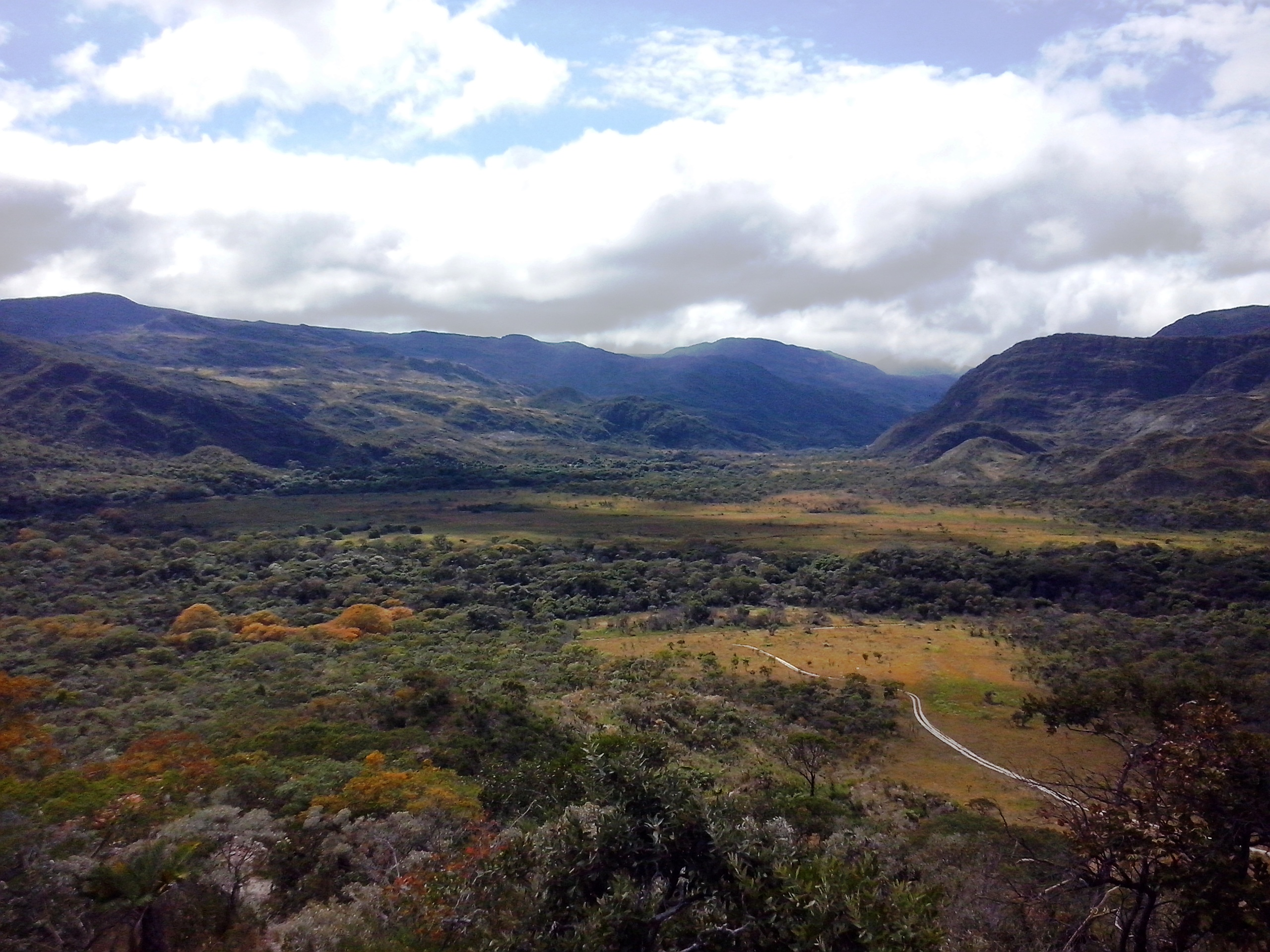
National Park Serra do Cipó, Brazil

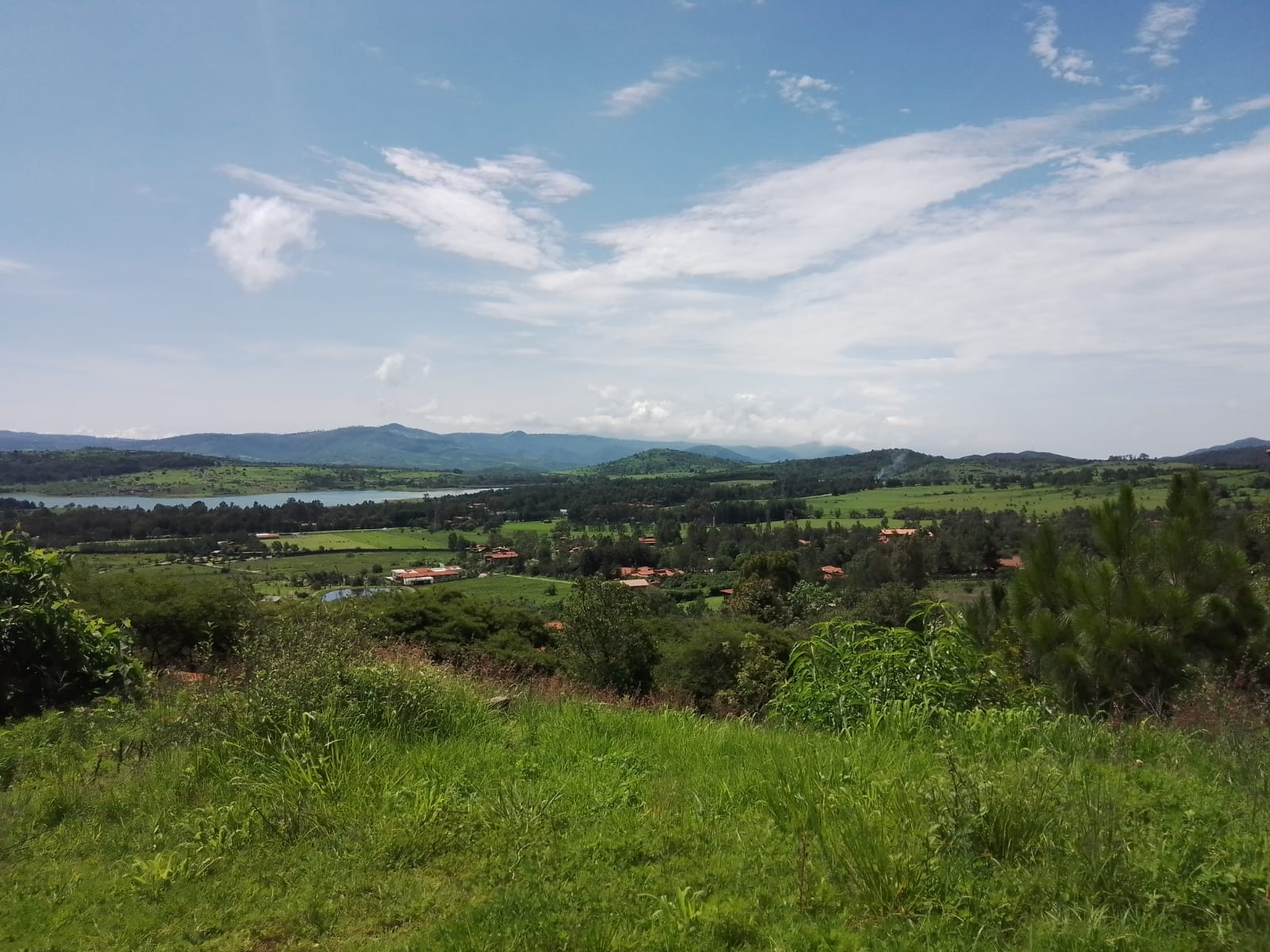
Tapalpa, Jalisco in the green, example of Cwb climate with coniferous groves

A Highland subhumid temperate climate, officially classified as a Subtropical highland climate or Monsoon-influenced temperate oceanic climate under the Köppen classification (Cwb), exists in elevated portions of the world that are within either the tropics or subtropics, though it is typically found in mountainous locations in some tropical countries. Despite the latitude, the higher altitudes of these regions mean that the climate tends to share characteristics with oceanic climates.

La Paz, Bolivia

Climate chart (precipitation, max. and min. temperature)
J	F	M	A	M	J	J	A	S	O	N	D
126 19 7	81 19 7	68 19 7	27 19 6	8.9 19 5	7.9 18 3	5.3 17 3	12 18 4	25 19 5	38 20 6	44 20 7	82 20 8
- █ Average max. and min. temperatures in °C
- █ Precipitation totals in mm
Imperial conversion
J	F	M	A	M	J	J	A	S	O	N	D
4.9 65 45	3.2 66 45	2.7 66 45	1.1 67 43	0.4 66 40	0.3 64 38	0.2 63 37	0.5 65 39	1 66 41	1.5 68 43	1.7 69 45	3.2 68 46
- █ Average max. and min. temperatures in °F
- █ Precipitation totals in inches

=== Subpolar subhumid temperate climate ===
A Subpolar subhumid temperate climate, officially classified as a Cold subtropical highland climate or Monsoon-influenced subpolar oceanic climate under the Köppen classification (Cwc), is a sub-alpine climate. It is located only in Andean high plains in Bolivia and Perú, from 3200 m until 4000 m. It is a transition climate between Cwb and alpine climate ET.

== See also ==
- Humid temperate climate
- Mediterranean climate
- Temperate climate
- Köppen climate classification
