= Kalesar National Park =

Protected area in Haryana, India

- IUCN category IV (habitat/species management area)
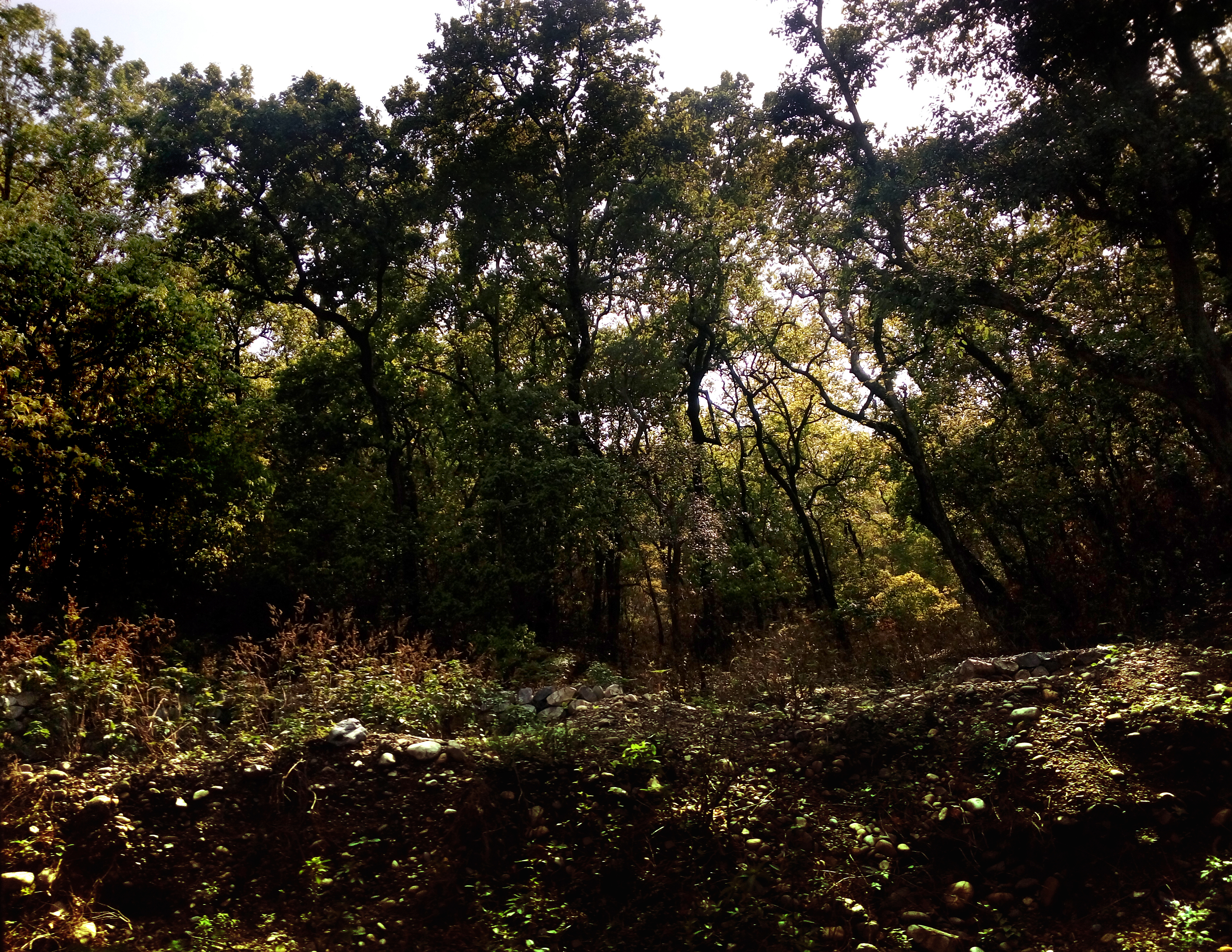

- Location within Haryana Location within India
- Interactive map of Kalesar National Park
- Location: Kalesar, Yamunanagar district, Haryana
- Coordinates: 30°22′N 77°32′E
- Area: 53 km^{2} (20 sq mi)
- Website: www.haryanaforest.gov.in

Kalesar National Park (13,000 acres (53 km^{2})) and adjacent Kalesar Wildlife Sanctuary (13,209 acres (53.45 km^{2}) are protected areas in Kalesar of Yamunanagar district of Haryana state in India, 46 kilometres from Yamunanagar city, 122 kilometres (76 mi) from Chandigarh.

Kalesar National Park was established in 2003. Kalesar National Park and Kalesar Wildlife Sanctuary are contiguous to Simbalbara National Park in Himachal Pradesh and Rajaji National Park in Uttarakhand. Kalesar is a popular destination for leopards, panthers, elephants, red jungle fowl and bird-watching. This forested area in the Shivalik foothills is covered primarily with sal with smattering of Semul, Amaltas and Bahera trees as well. Wildlife jeep safaris are available on 3 tracks. Park is closed July to September and during the remaining months visiting hours are 6 am to 10 am and 4 pm to 7 pm during summers, and 7 am to 11 am and 3.30 pm to 6 pm during winters.

== History ==
Kalesar National Park spread across 13,000 acres (53 km^{2}) was notified on 8 December 2003 and adjacent 13,209 acres (53.45 km^{2}) Kalesar Wildlife Sanctuary was notified on 13 December 1996. However, it is alleged, absence of sufficient funds from the centre is proving to be a hindrance in wildlife conservation in the national park.

=== Etymology ===
Kalesar National Park is named after the Kalesar Mahadev temple located in this national park.

=== 18th and 19th century ===
Afghan invader Ahmad Shah Abdali camped at Pinjore Gardens in 1765 and British Raj soldier Rollo Gillespie camped in these hills in 1807 for tiger hunting in these hills. By 1892–93, the count of tigers and panthers had dwindled due to excessive hunting. Consequently, by 1913 Sirmur State had banned the hunting.

=== Kalesar Mahadev temple ===
The ancient Kalesar Mahadev temple takes its name from the a corrupted form of Kaleshwar, a moniker of Hindu deity lord Shiva. It is located near NH 907 on the east side and 400 meters north of Kalesar Dak bungalow (rest house) and 8.5km north of Hathni Kund Barrage. There is also another later era Shiva temple north of Kalesar Mahadev temple.

As part of INR1200 crore Morni to Kalesar tourism development plan announced in January 2019, Government of Haryana is developing this temple, along with Kapal Mochan Tirth, Panchmukhi Hanuman temple of Basatiyawala, Sharda Mata Temple of Chotta Trilokpur and Lohgarh fort capital of Banda Singh Bahadur.

=== Colonial Dak Bungalow ===
This area attracts bird watchers and wildlife enthusiasts and contains a 100-year-old colonial dak bungalow. Located near NH 907 on the east side and 400 meters south of Kalesar Mahadev temple and 8.1km north of Hathni Kund Barrage. This dak bungalow is surrounded by multi-layered gardens and a sweeping view of the Yamuna river. Typical of Raj bungalow architecture, there are high-ceiling rooms, parquet flooring and teak panelling along walls. A fireplace with a mantelpiece above and antique furniture completes the period setting.

== Geography ==
The Kalesar national park and wildlife sanctuary are located on both sides of Yamuna Nagar-Paonta Sahib Road in Yamuna Nagar district in Haryana, about 8 km from Hathni Kund Barrage, 15 km from Paonta sahib, 55 km from Dehradun, 43 km from Yamunanagar, 119 km via bitumen-paved Bilaspur road through forest or 122 km via NH 7 from Chandigarh. It is bounded by Yamuna river to the east, Rajaji National Park in Uttrakhand to the northeast, Simbalbara National Park in main Shivalik Hill range to the north on Haryana's border with Himachal Pradesh, Morni Hills and agrarian farms to the west, and agrarian farms in planes of Yamunanagar district to the south.

=== Wildlife Safaris ===
Jeep safaris are available on the following 3 motorable tracks only during the designated park opening months and hours: 20 feet wide route-1 of 7 km, 60 feet wide route-2 of 6.5 km and 60 feet wide route-3 of 6 km. Private vehicles are not allowed on these routes, except only those pre-registered with the wildlife department for the purpose of operating safaris. Park is closed July to September and during the remaining months visiting hours are 6 am to 10 am and 4 pm to 7 pm during summers, and 7 am to 11 am and 3.30 pm to 6 pm during winters.

=== Shivalik foothills ===
The foothills of Shivalik Hills range, where this park lies, runs parallel with the Himalayan range from Haridwar on the Ganges to the banks of the Beas, with a length of 200 miles (320 km) and an average width of 10 miles (16 km). The intermediate valley lying between the outer hills and Nahan. The elevation varies from 2000 to 3,500 ft (1,100 m). Geologically speaking the Shivaliks belong to the tertiary deposits of the outer Himalayas and are chiefly composed of low sandstone and conglomerate hills, the solidified and upheaved detritus of the great range in their rear. There are a number of pebbled dry rivulets, which come alive during the monsoon season. A dirt road diverts from the highway where a faded billboard announces entry into the reserve forest mainly consisting of Sal trees.

== Flora ==
=== Dense old forest ===
Kalesar has 53% dense forest, 38% open forest, 9% scrub. Total forest cover is about 71%. Spread over an area of 11,570 acres (46.8 km^{2}), Kalesar reserve forest is the only one of its kind in Haryana. Besides the tall, leafy sal trees that constitute the dense age-old forest belt of the Doon valley, there are other trees like Semul, Amaltas and Bahera. khair, shisham, sain, jhingan, chhal (Anogeissus latifolia) also found in the forest. It is the only forest in Haryana with a natural Sal tree belt. Among the flora is the small sindoor tree — it has dainty flowers, which turn into pods to produce the vermilion sindoor that adorns the tresses of married women. Climbers snake up the tree stems, and the forest floor is littered with fallen leaves and foliage plants. Sculptural anthills dot the landscape. There is a long stretch of man-made forest clearing and a 'fire line' which helps in containing forest fires.

=== Medicinal plants ===
In the jungle, there is a machaan (high observation tower) with a dangerous-looking service ladder and views of 11000 acres (45 km^{2}) of the great sal forest; criss-crossed by fire lines and meandering rivulets. About 20 km away on the Chuharpur road, is the Ch. Devi Lal Herbal Nature Park, a project of the Forests Department, Haryana. The park covers an area of 50 acres (200,000 m^{2}) with 61,000 shrubs of herbs and 6100 medicinal tree plants.

== Fauna ==
=== Wild animals ===
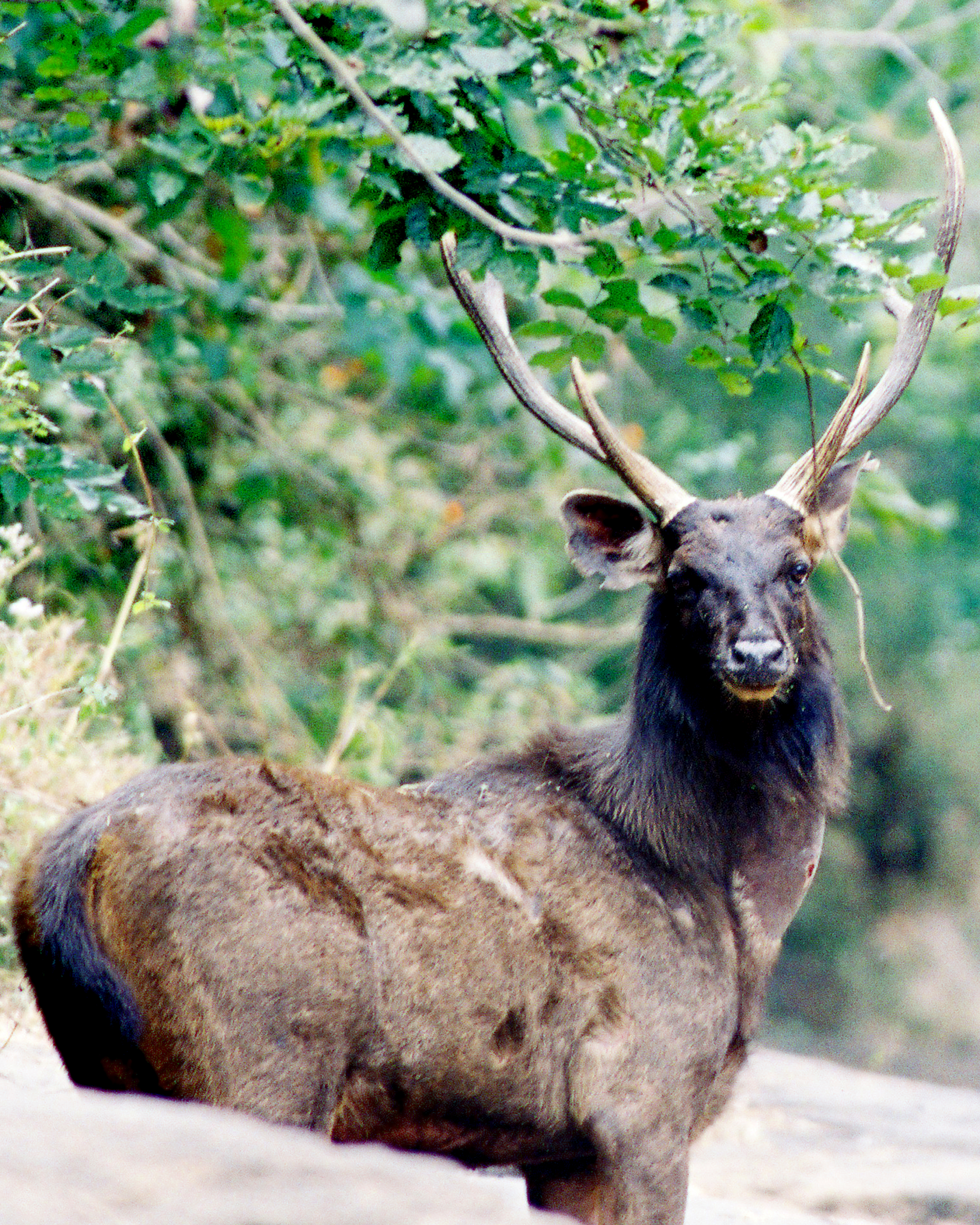
Sambar deer

Khol Hi-Raitan Wildlife Sanctuary and Bir Shikargah Wildlife Sanctuary are only 3 km aerial distance from each other, both are also only few km away from Kalesar National Park, all of which lie in the Shivalik hills of Haryana. All these three sanctuaries have similar species of wild animal that migrate from one sanctuary to another.

In 2016, survey recorded Indian leopard, leopard cat, rusty-spotted cat, jungle cat, Indian jackal, Asiatic elephant, chital, sambar, barking deer, goral, nilgai, Indian crested porcupine, small Indian civet, common palm civet, grey langur, rhesus macaque, Indian grey mongoose, boar and Indian hare.

Earlier May 2004 survey in collaboration with Wildlife Institute of India found wild boars, sambhars, hares, red junglefowl, porcupine, monkeys, chitals etc.

==== Leopard ====
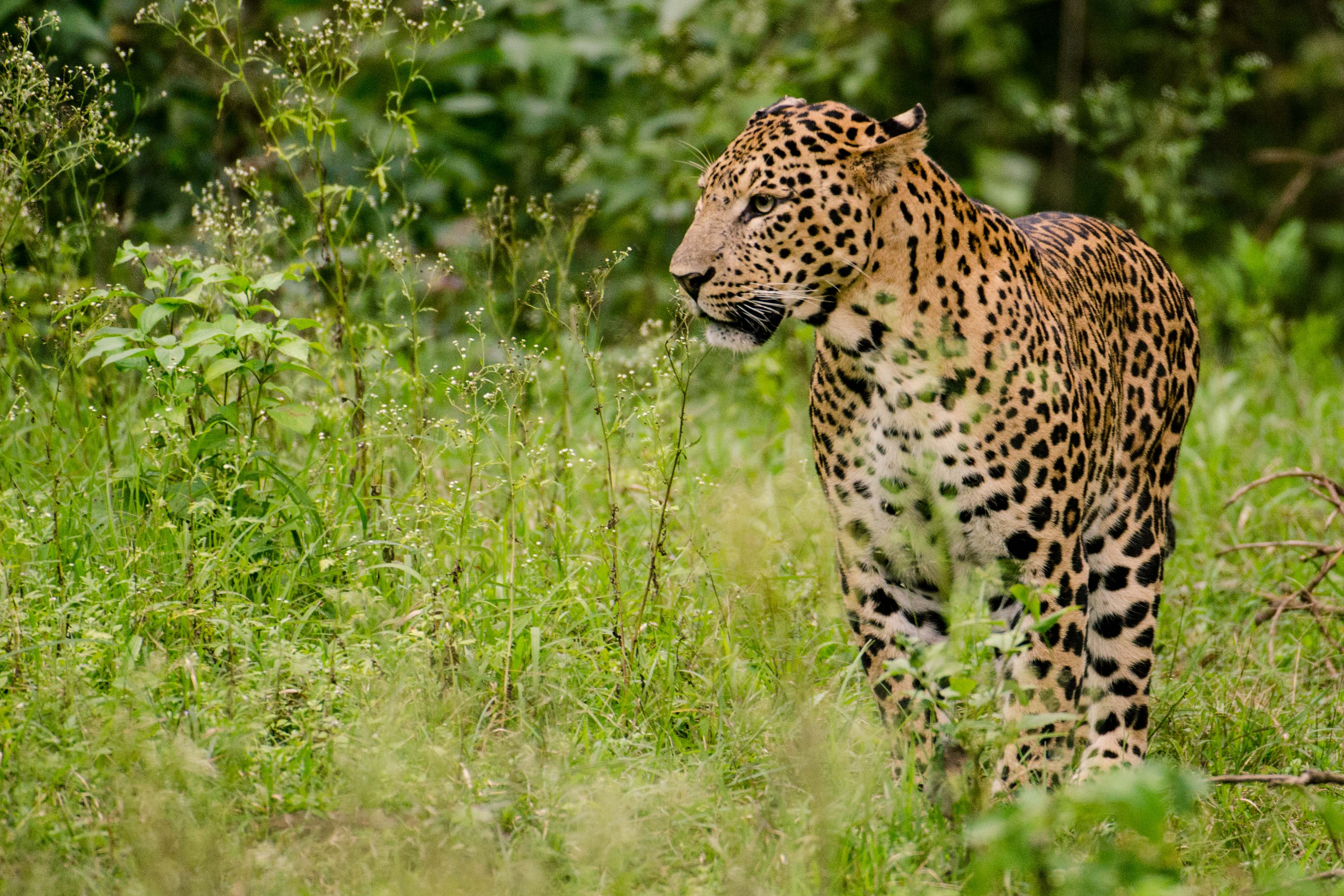
Indian leopard

In 2016, the annual two-month animal counting survey done by the Wildlife Institute of India using installed camera, found 19 species of mammalians including 42 Indian leopards., up from 19 in 1989 report (reported then as panthers).

==== Elephants ====
Kalesar Wildlife Sanctuary has natural population of the wild elephants. It is also home to the Ch. Surinder Singh Elephant Rehabilitation Centre (ERC) at Ban Santoor, which is a sanctuary to rehabilitate the rescued abused, exploited and sick elephants. It was set up by the Haryana Forests department in association with an NGO called Wildlife SOS, with the help of Government of India grant under the Project Elephant. ERC has elephant shelters, veterinary services, elephant husbandry and fodder service, elephant walking and exercise trails, etc. In 2015, it had 3 rescued female elephants, namely Erica, Ella and Lilly. Wild elephants also roam Kalesar and adjoining Rajaji National Park and Tiger Reserve spread across Uttrakhand and Himachal Pradesh. In January 2018, Delhi Forests department planned to rescue all the 7 domesticated elephants of Delhi kept in captivity, 2 of which will be sent to Kalesar Wildlife Sanctuary in Haryana and 4 will be sent to Rajaji National Park and Tiger Reserve in Uttrakhand.

=== Wildlife preservation ===
Eight watering holes have been dug up across the forest area to ensure that the wildlife does not stray into human habitats on its fringes in search of drinking water. Earthen dams have also been constructed to conserve rainwater for use of wildlife. Apart from this, there is proposal of Construction of 8 dams within this sanctuary area which is at the stage of Forest and wildlife clearances which is being taken care by Er. Navneet Kumar from Gaya Bihar working in Haryana Irrigation Department.

There is a plan to build a fence around the area.

==== Wildlife protection force and courts ====
As for the steps taken to ensure protection of wildlife and environment, the forest staff have been given weapons by the state government to tackle the menace posed by poachers. The state had also set up two special environmental courts in Kurukshetra and Faridabad to deal with crimes related to poaching and illicit felling of trees from the area.

==== Monitoring and census cameras ====
The Forests Department, Haryana, with funding provided by the Wildlife Institute of India, installed 80 cameras at 40 locations across the park in December 2014, primarily to monitor the movements of tigers, leopards and other animals in the park, as well as to conduct annual two-month long animal species and animal count survey.

== Issues ==
In 2026, 4400 Khair trees were illegally felled in the sanctuary.

== Gallery ==
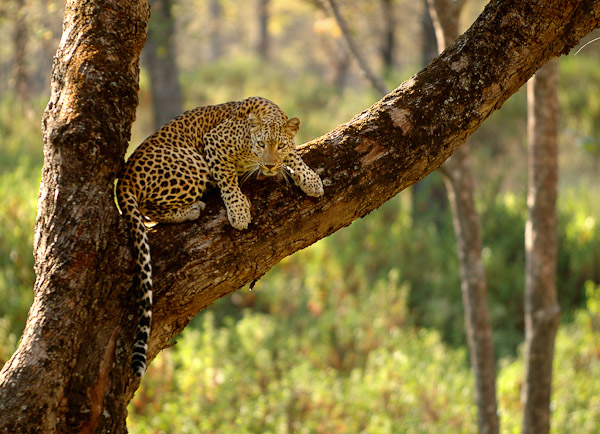
Indian leopard is found here

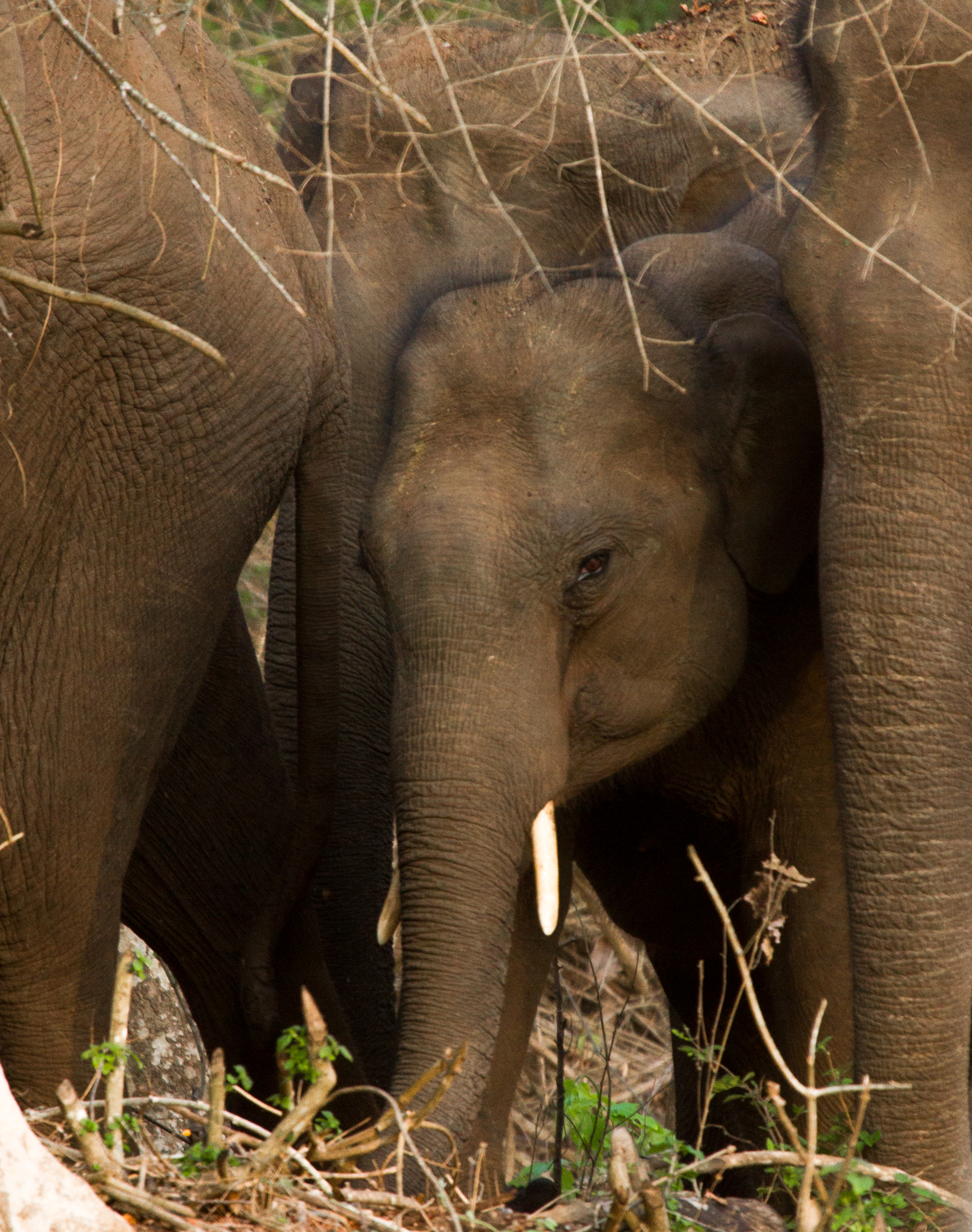
Elephant

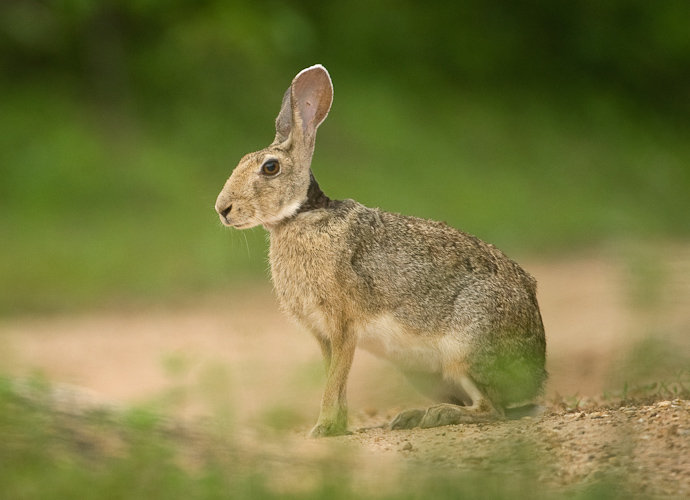
Indian hare is found at Kalesar

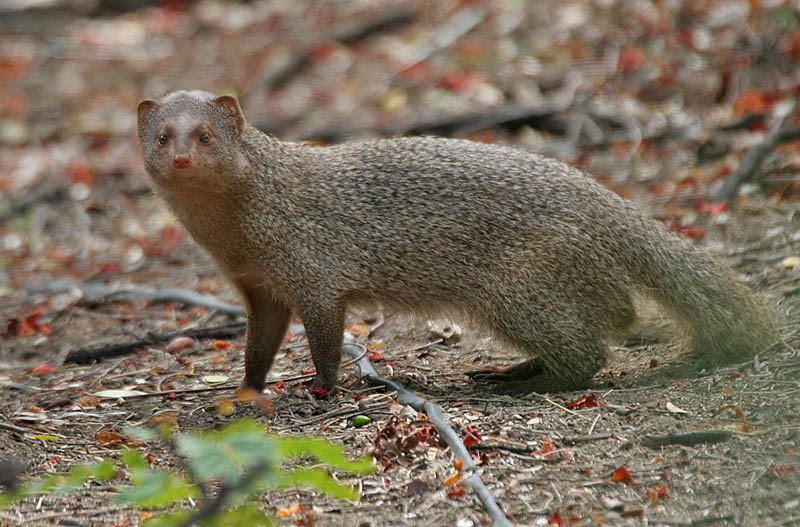
Indian grey mongoose is found at Kalesar

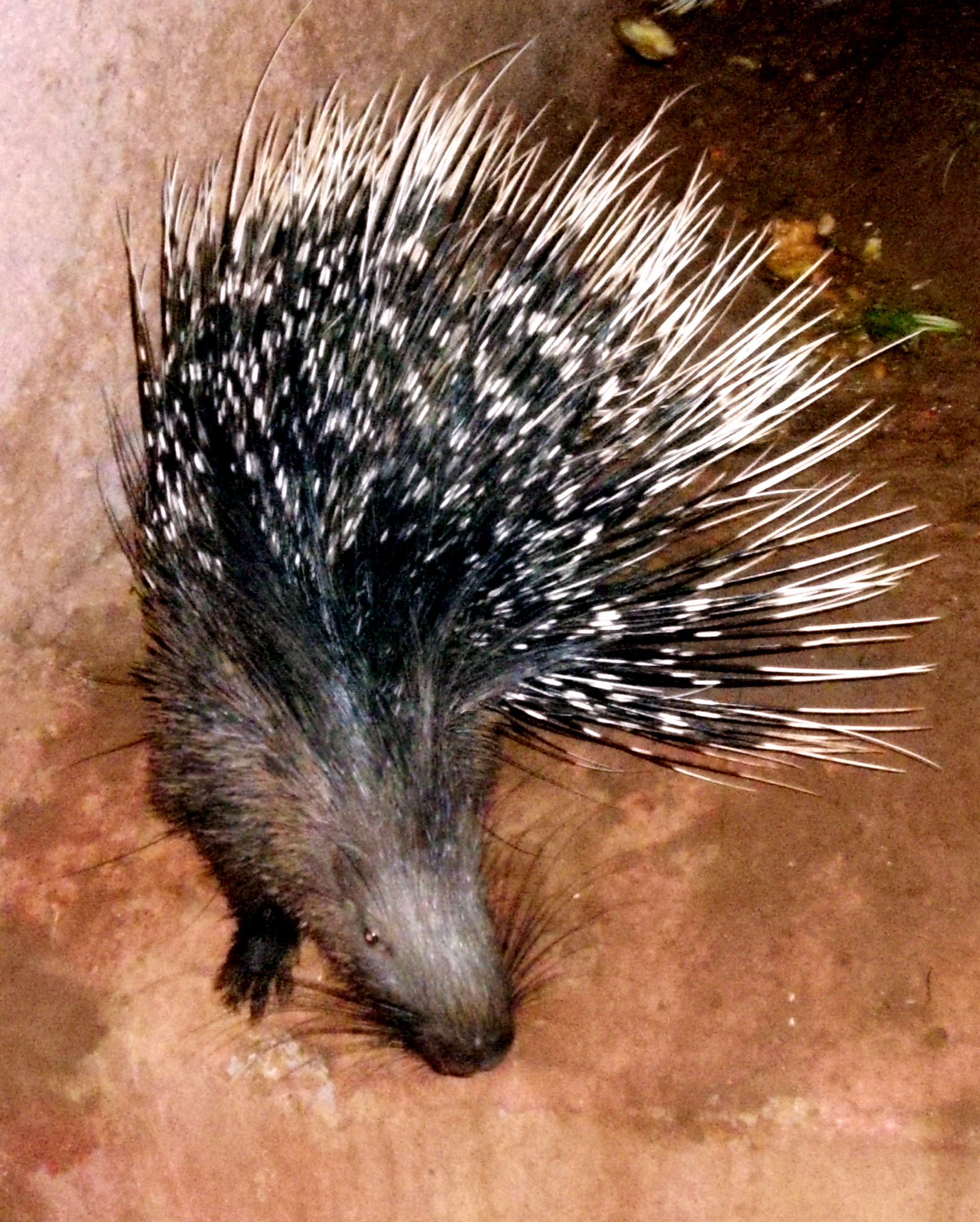
Indian crested porcupine is found at Kalesar

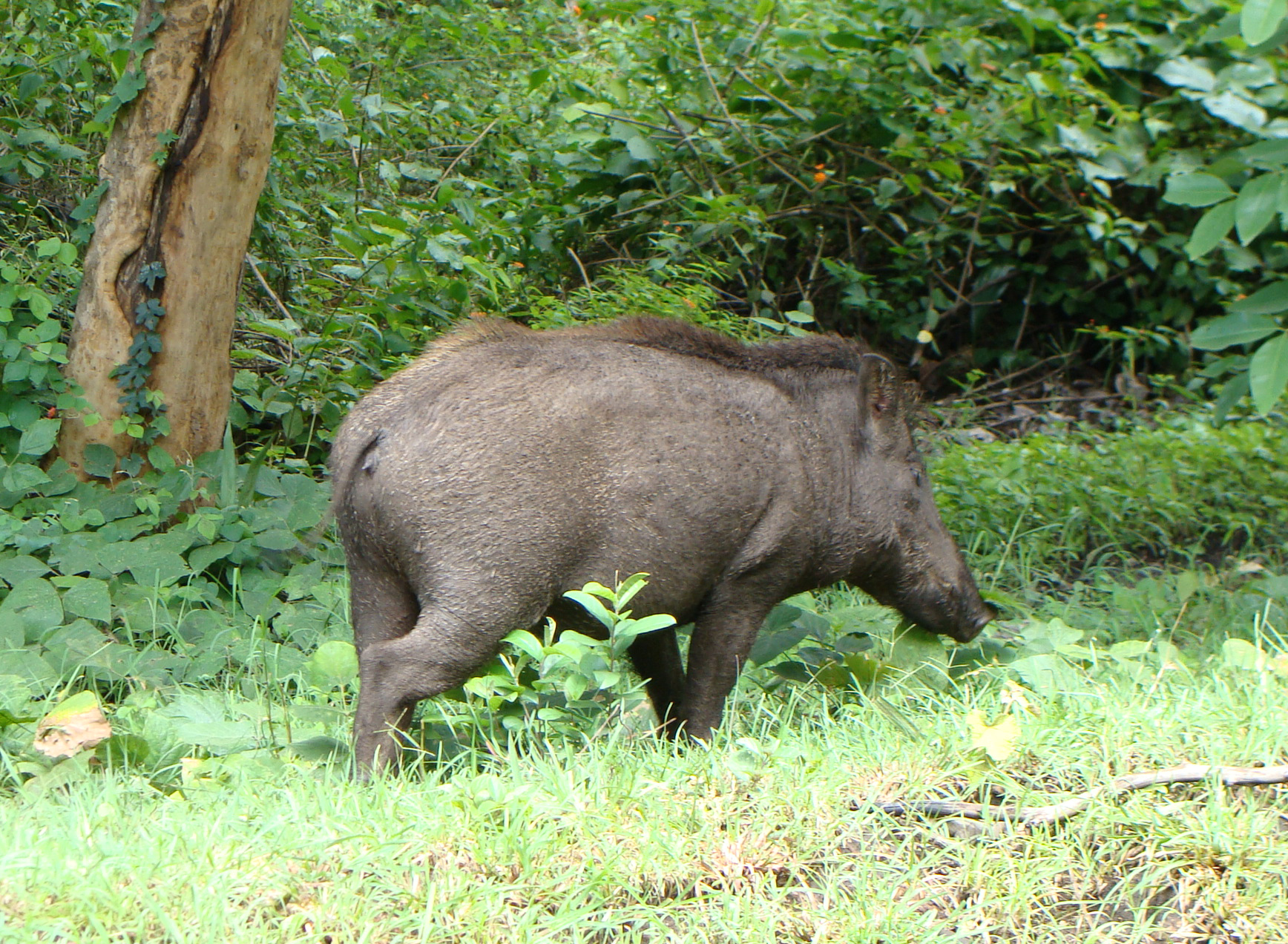
Wild boar

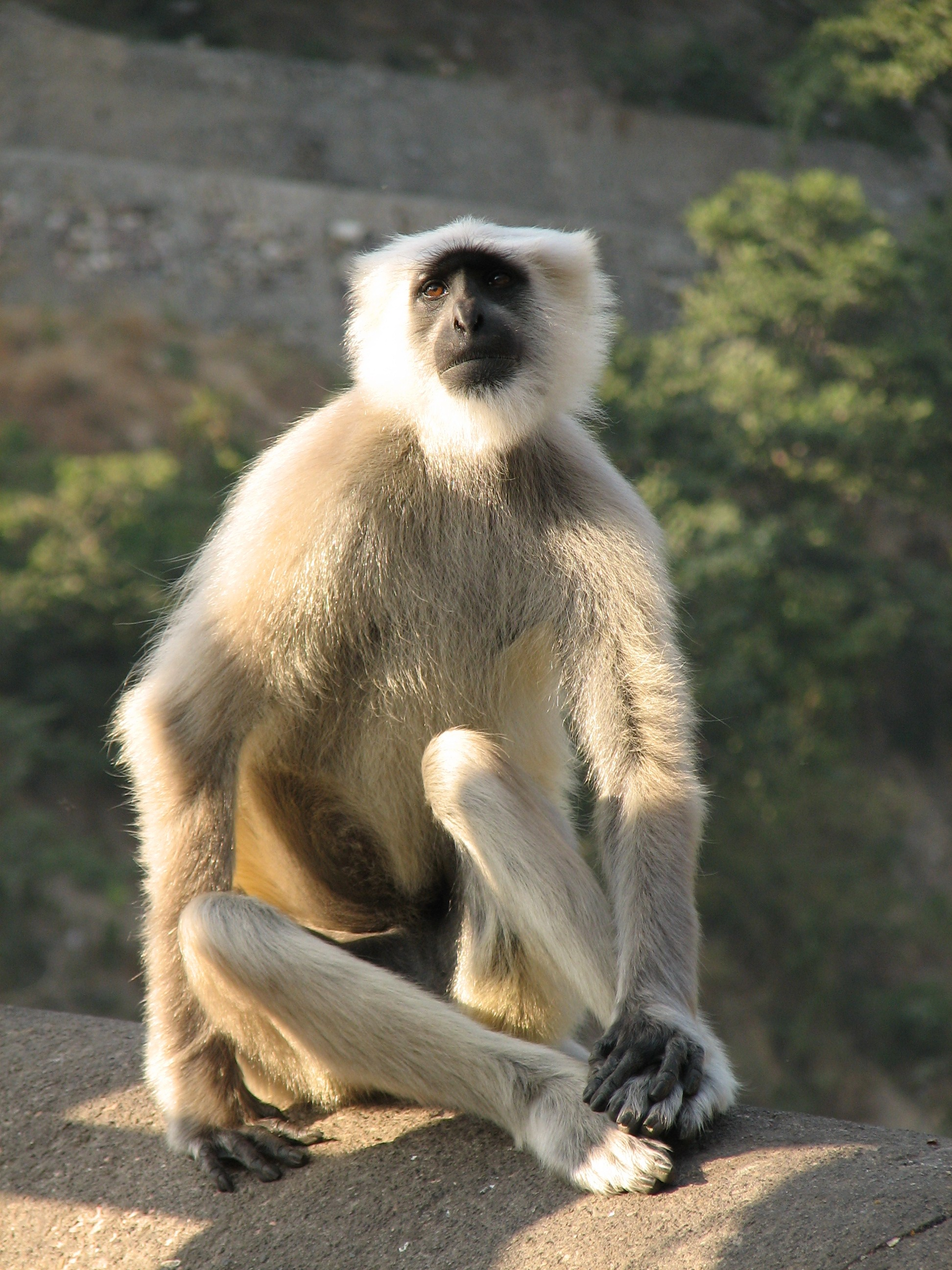
Langur monkey

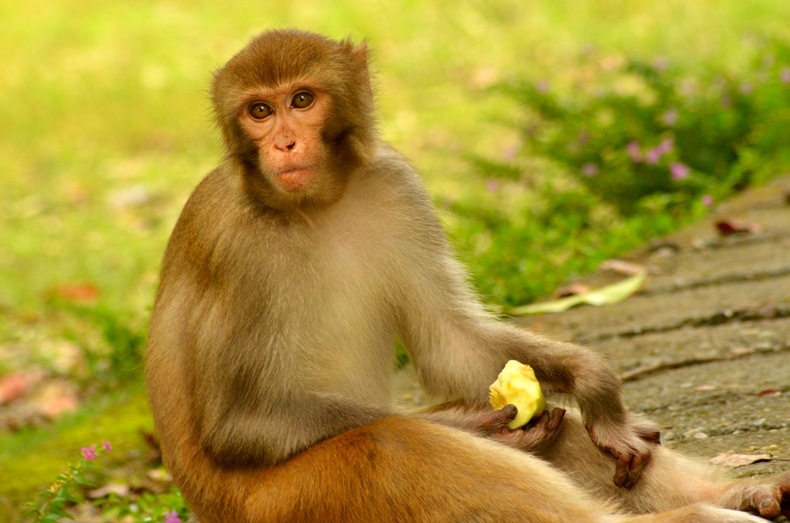
Rhesus macaque

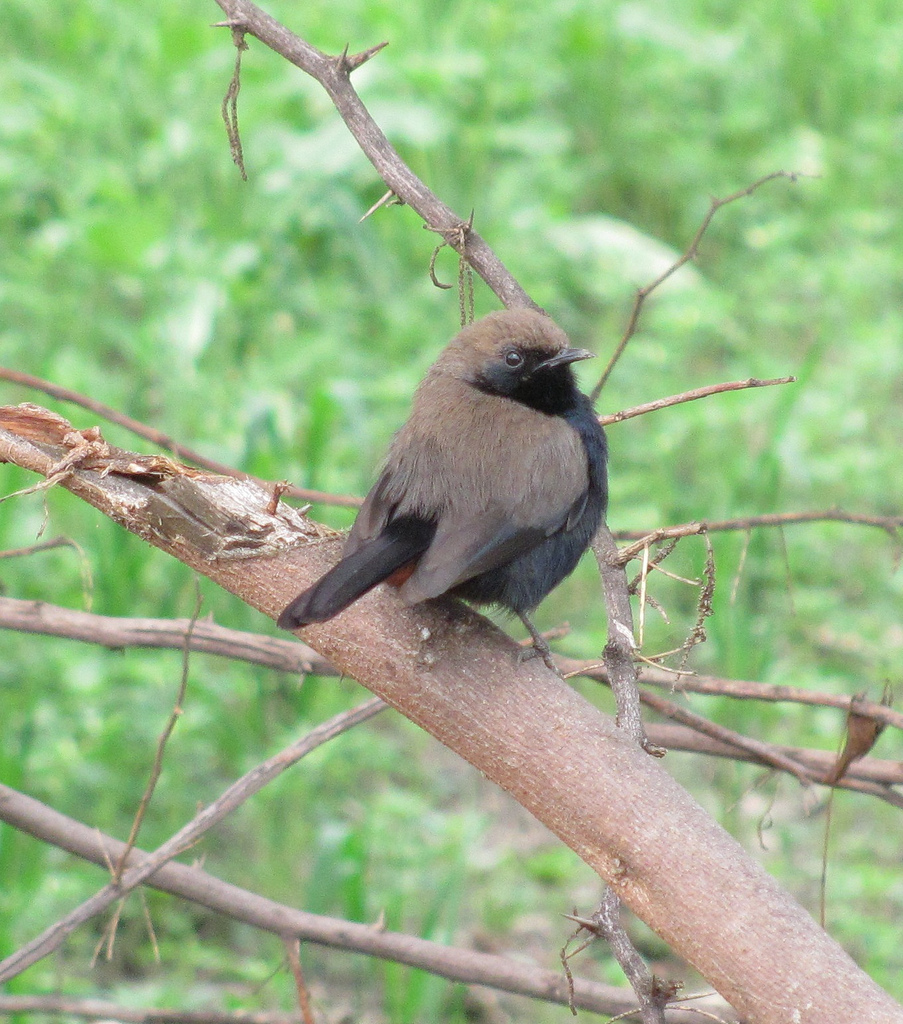
Indian robin
