= List of Panchatantra stories =

The Panchatantra is an ancient Sanskrit collection of stories, probably first composed around 300 CE (give or take a century or two), though some of its component stories may be much older. The original text is not extant, but the work has been widely revised and translated such that there exist "over 200 versions in more than 50 languages." The actual content of these versions sometimes differs greatly.

The lists of stories in a few notable pared below.

== Key ==
- A-T — Aarne–Thompson tale type index number.
- Edge — Franklin Edgerton's 1924 reconstruction of the Sanskrit text of the original Panchatantra. Though scholars debate details of his text, its list of stories can be considered definitive. It is the basis of English translations by Edgerton himself (1924) and Patrick Olivelle (1997 & 2006). The content of 2 other important versions, the "Southern" Panchatantra and the Tantrākhyāyika are very similar to that of Edgerton's reconstruction.
- Durg — Durgasimha's Kannada translation of c. 1031 CE is one of the earliest extant translations into an Indian vernacular.
- Soma — Somadeva's Kathasaritsagara ("Ocean of Streams of Story") of 1070 is a massive collection of stories and legends, to which a version of the Panchatantra contributes roughly half of Book 10. The numbers given are those of N. M. Penzer, which situate the Panchatantra passages within the Kathasaritsagara as a whole. At the end of each of the Panchatantra's books, Somadeva (or his source) adds a number of unrelated stories, "usually of the 'noodle' variety."
- Purn — Purnabhadra's recension of 1199 CE is one of the longest Sanskrit versions, and is the basis of both Arthur W. Ryder's English translation of 1925, and Chandra Rajan's of 1993.
- Nara — Hitopadesha by Narayana is probably the most popular version in India, and was the second work ever translated from Sanskrit into English (by Charles Wilkins in 1787). The Hitopadesha itself exists in several versions, without an extant original. However, in this case the differences are comparatively trivial. Narayana split, combined, and reordered his source stories more extensively than most other revisers of the Panchatantra, so while cells in other columns generally have a one-to-one relationship, this does not hold true for the Hitopadesha.

== Table ==
In addition to the stories listed below, many versions begin with a prelude in which a king bewails the stupidity of his sons, and the wise Vishnu Sharma (the Panchatantra's reputed author) bets that he can teach them statecraft in a mere 6 months; the tales constitute his lesson. (Of the versions tabulated below, only Somadeva's Kathasaritsagara lacks this "master frame" — an unsurprising omission, since the Panchatantra section is placed within the "master frame" of the Kathasaritsagara itself.)

Story	A-T	Edge	Durg	Soma	Purn	Nara
The wily jackals- trouble between friends		I.Frame	I.Frame	84	I.Frame	II.1; II.3; II.7; II.9; II.10
The story of the evil King Kachadruma			I.1			
The naughty monkey and the wedge		I.1	I.2	84A	I.1	II.2
The jackal and the war drum		I.2	I.4	84B	I.2	
The wise minister					I.3	
The adventures of an ascetic		I.3a			I.4a	
The saint, his own pouch and the rogue		I.3a	I.5		I.4a	
The wolf and the rams		I.3b	I.5.1		I.4b	
The unfaithful wife Tantuvayika			I.5.2			
A weaver cuts the nose of a bawd		I.3c			I.4c	II.6
The crows and the evil snake		I.4	I.6		I.5	II.8; II.9
The crab cuts off the heron's head		I.5	I.7	84C	I.6	IV.7
The hare that outwitted the lion		I.6	I.8	84D	I.7	II.9
Weaver as Vișṇu					I.8	
The monkey who died by giving shelter to a hunter			I.9			
The Brahmin and the ungrateful goldsmith			I.9.1		I.9	
The guest		I.7	I.11	84E	I.10	
The watersnakes and a cobra			I.11.1			
The owl and the poor swan			I.11.2			
The Blue Jackal					I.11	III.8
Goose and owl					I.12	
The camel and the foolish offer		I.8	I.12	84F	I.13	IV.11
The lion and the carpenter					I.14	
The sandpipers and the ocean		I.9	I.14	84G	I.15	II.10
The turtle and the geese		I.10	I.14.1	84GG	I.16	IV.2; IV.4
The Brahmin Devadatta, the story teller, and the ogre			I.14.1.1			
The lady who didn't listen to her daughter-in-law			I.14.1.2			
The tale of three fish		I.11	I.14.2	84GGG	I.17	IV.3; IV.4
The sparrows and the mighty elephant					I.18	
Goose and fowler					I.19	
The evil monster					I.20	
Jackal outwits lion					I.21	
King and ascetic					I.22	
Girl who married a snake	433				I.23	
Indra's parrot and the god of death					I.24	
The stupid advice		I.12	III.3	84H	I.25	III.2
Two friends and betrayed trust	613	I.13	I.15	84I	I.26	
The cranes, the black snake and the 'helpful' enemy		I.14	I.15.1	84J	I.27	IV.5
Tit for tat	1592	I.15		84K	I.28	
The twins			I.10		I.29	
The robber's sacrifice					I.30a	
Faithful but foolish monkey kills the king	1586				I.31b	
The monkeys that died due to a ram			I.16			
(12 additional stories)				85-96		
The four friends and the hunter- gaining of friends		II.Frame	V.Frame	97	II.Frame	I.1; I.2; I.4; I.7; I.9
The pigeons and the fowler		(II.Frame)	V.1		(II.Frame)	
The Bharunda birds					II.1	
A wise old bird			V.1.1			
The elephants and the mice			V.2			
The Brahmin and the crab			V.3			
The ascetic and the jumping mouse		II.1	V.4	97A	II.2	I.5; I.6
The woman who traded sesame for sesame		II.2		97AA	II.3	
The greed of the jackal and the bowstring		II.3	V.4.1	97AAA	II.4	I.7
The man who got what was coming to him					II.5	
The weaver's options: to be generous or stingy					II.6	
The jackal waits for the bull's testicles to fall	115				II.7	
The mice who rescued the elephant					II.8	
How the deer Chitranga got caught in a trap		II.4	V.5		II.9	
(23 additional stories)				98-120		
On war and peace: elect for the owl		III.Frame	III.Frame	121	III.Frame	IV.1
How owls started to hate crows			III.1			
The owl is elected king of the birds		III.2	III.3	121B	III.1	
The lake of the moon		III.3		121BB	III.2	III.4
The cunning mediator		III.4	III.1.1	121BBB	III.3	I.4
The ascetic and the bad world			III.1.1.1			
How Shishupala died in the hands of Krishna			III.2			
The Brahmin, the goat and the three crooks		III.5	I.13	121C	III.4	IV.10; IV.11
The king cobra and the ants					III.5	
The cobra and the greed for the gold coins	285D				III.6	
The golden bird					III.7	
The hunter and the dove's sacrifice			III.4		III.8	
The old merchant and his young wife		III.6		121D	III.9	I.6
The thief, the demon, and a Brahmin		III.7	III.5	121E	III.10	
The tale of two snakes					III.11	
How the unfaithful wife tricked her foolish husband		III.8		121F	III.12	III.7
The marriage of a mouse that turned into a girl	2031C	III.9	III.7	121G	III.13	
The sage who changed his pet dog into different animals			III.7.1			
The bird and it's precious gold excreta					III.14	
The jackal and the talking cave			I.3		III.15	
The foolish frogs		III.10	III.8	121H	III.16	IV.12
The Brahmin catches his wife's lover			III.8.1		III.17	
(13 additional stories)				122-132		
On losing what you have gained: The monkey and the unfaithful crocodile	91	IV.Frame	IV.Frame	133	IV.Frame	
The poisonous friendship					IV.1	
The brainless donkey	52	IV.1	IV.1	133A	IV.2	
The honest muscular potter and his scar					IV.3	
The jackal that killed no elephants					IV.4	
The Brahmin and his ungrateful wife					IV.5	
Henpecked husbands					IV.6	
The donkey in the tiger's skin		III.1		121A	IV.7	III.3
The adulterous wife is tricked by her lover					IV.8	
The monkey and the annoying sparrow					IV.9	III.2
The jackal's quick thinking					IV.10	
The dog and the famine	112				IV.11	
(6 additional stories)				134-139		
The greedy barber's folly		V.2	II.2		V.Frame	III.10; IV.13
The three proverbs which stopped king from killing his own wives			II.2.1			
On hasty actions: Killing a mongoose in haste	178A	V.Frame	II.Frame	140	V.1	
The wheel on the head of the excessively greedy					V.2	
The dead lion			III.6		V.3	
The tale of two fishes and a frog	105				V.4	
The singing donkey and the jackal					V.5	
The weaver's wish	750A				V.6	
The beggar's dream; or building castles in the air	1430	V.1	II.1		V.7	IV.8
The old monkey's revenge					V.8	
The credulous demon					V.9	
The three-breasted princess					V.10	
The Brahmin and the soft-foot fiend					V.11	
The old pious lady Gautami			II.3			
(6 additional stories)				141-146		
The false friend						I.3
The merchant's bride						I.8
The cat who became superfluous						II.4
The canny procuress						II.5
War (frame)						III.1
The goose and the crow						III.5
The crow and the quail						III.6
The faithful servant						III.9
The hermit and the mouse						IV.6
The two ogres						IV.9
