= Bir Shikargarh Wildlife Sanctuary =

Wildlife sanctuary in Haryana, India

Bir Shikargah Wildlife Sanctuary
- IUCN category IV (habitat/species management area)
- Location within Haryana Location within India
- Interactive map of Bir Shikargah Wildlife Sanctuary
- Location: Panchkula district, Haryana, India
- Coordinates: 30.771779°N 76.964270°E
- Area: 7.67
- Established: 1987
- Governing body: Forests Department, Haryana
- Website: www.haryanaforest.gov.in

Bir Shikargah Wildlife Sanctuary is situated in Panchkula district of Haryana state, India. It is spread over an area of 767.30 hectares (1,896.0 acres). It also houses Vulture Conservation and Breeding Centre, Pinjore.

== Location ==
It is 8 kilometres (5.0 mi) away from Pinjore on Pinjor-Mallah Road. It is 10 kilometres (6.2 mi) from Kalka, 20 kilometres (12 mi) from Panchkula, 30 kilometres (19 mi) from Chandigarh, 20 kilometres (12 mi) from Morni Hill station. Forests Department, Haryana of Government of Haryana officially notified this as Wildlife Sanctuary 29 May 1987.

== Eco-sensitive zone of sanctuary ==
In 2009, the Government of India declared it an Eco-sensitive Zone (ESZ), as a result development will not be permitted within a 5 kilometres (3.1 mi) radius.

== Animals ==
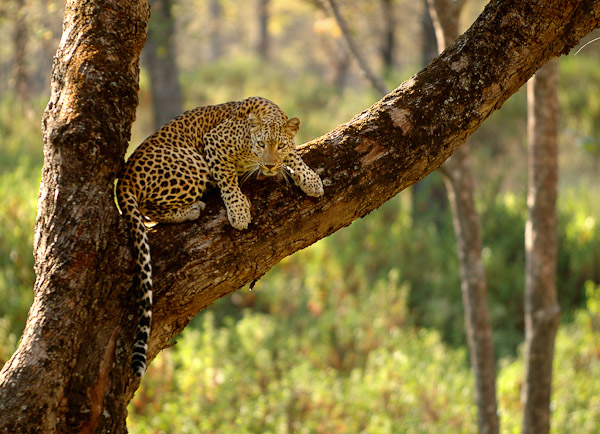
Indian leopard

Bir Shikargah Wildlife Sanctuary and Khol Hi-Raitan Wildlife Sanctuary are only 3 kilometres (1.9 mi) aerial distance from each other, both are also only few km away from Kalesar National Park, all of which lie in the Shivalik hills of Haryana. All these three sanctuaries have similar species of wild animal that migrate from one sanctuary to another. The wild species include Indian leopard, Asiatic elephant, Chital (spotted deer), Sambar deer, Wild boar, Rhesus macaque, Gray langur, Striped hyena, Indian jackal, Jungle cat, Indian gray mongoose, Indian fox and Indian jackal.

== Nearby attractions ==
- Kalesar National Park (Map) - 15 kilometres (9.3 mi) from Yamunanagar on Chhachhrauli road. It has elephant, wild boar, sambar deer, hare, red junglefowl, porcupine, monkey and chital.
- Khol Hi-Raitan Wildlife Sanctuary (Map) - It covers area of 4,883 hectares (12,070 acres). It is 3 kilometres (1.9 mi) aerial from Bir Shikargah Wildlife Sanctuary near Panchkula on Morni road and 20 kilometres (12 mi) from Chandigarh.

== See also ==
- List of National Parks & Wildlife Sanctuaries of Haryana, India
- Haryana Tourism
- List of Monuments of National Importance in Haryana
- List of State Protected Monuments in Haryana
- List of Indus Valley Civilization sites in Haryana, Punjab, Rajasthan, Gujarat, India & Pakistan
- Kalesar National Park, 15 kilometres (9.3 mi) from Yamunanagar (Map)
- Sultanpur National Park, 25 kilometres (16 mi) from Gurgaon on Chhachhrauli road (Map)
- Saraswati Wildlife Sanctuary, 10 kilometres (6.2 mi) from Pehowa (Map)
