= Narayana Pandita =

Narayana Pandita may refer to:

- Narayana Panditacharya or Narayana Pandita (c. 1290 – c. 1370), author of Sri MadhwaVijaya
- Narayana Pandita (mathematician) (1325–1400), author of Ganita Kaumudi
- Narayan Pandit, author of the Hitopadesha in Sanskrit
