= Simbalbara National Park =

National Park in India

Coordinates: 30.439°N 77.473°E

- IUCN category II (national park)
- Interactive map of Simbalbara National Park
- Location: Sirmour, Himachal Pradesh, India
- Area: 27.88 km^{2} (10.76 sq mi)
- Established: 2010

Simbalbara National Park is a national park in India, located in the Kiyarda Dun valley of Sirmour District, Himachal Pradesh, along its border with Haryana. It is also known as Col. Sher Jung National Park. The vegetation consists of dense Sal forests with grassy glades. The protected area was created in 1958 as the Simbalbara Wildlife Sanctuary with 19.03 km^{2}. In 2010, 8.88 km^{2} were added to it and it was made into a National Park, covering an area of about 27.88 square kilometres (10.76 sq mi). There is a perennial stream in the valley. The Travel and Tourism department of Himachal Pradesh has preserved the park in its natural form.

Simbalbara Forest Rest House is connected from Puruwala and provides views of the valley. Tiger, Goral, Sambhar and Chittal are the common animals found here. There are walking trails also in the adjoining forests. October and November are the best times to visit the park.

== Flora and fauna ==
The principal species forming the top canopy are Sal (Shorea robusta) and Terminalia elliptica. On the riverine side, Eucalyptus, Jamun (Syzygium cumini), and Senna siamea are present. Mammalian herbivores include Nilgai, Sambar deer, spotted deer, wild boar, porcupines, goral, barking deer, and Rhesus macaques. Avifauna in this national park include Indian rollers, dollarbirds, kingfishers, and three hornbill species. Raptors include crested serpent eagles, Brahminy kites, and long-billed vultures.

== Access ==
- Nearest airport: Chandigarh (87-km from Nahan)
- Railway: The nearest railhead is at Ambala cantt. (63-km from Nahan)
- By road: Nahan is accessible connected by road, linked to many cities and tourist spots.
- Nearest village: Palhori opposite Simbalbara

== See also ==
- Kalesar National Park, Haryana
- Rajaji National Park, Uttarakhand
