= Chang Lo =

Indian ceremonial dance

Chang Lo dance is performed by Chang tribe of Nagaland. They perform it to celebrate their victory against enemies. It is a three-day festival where drama is also performed.
