= Hitopadesha =

Medieval era Sanskrit text with human and animal fables

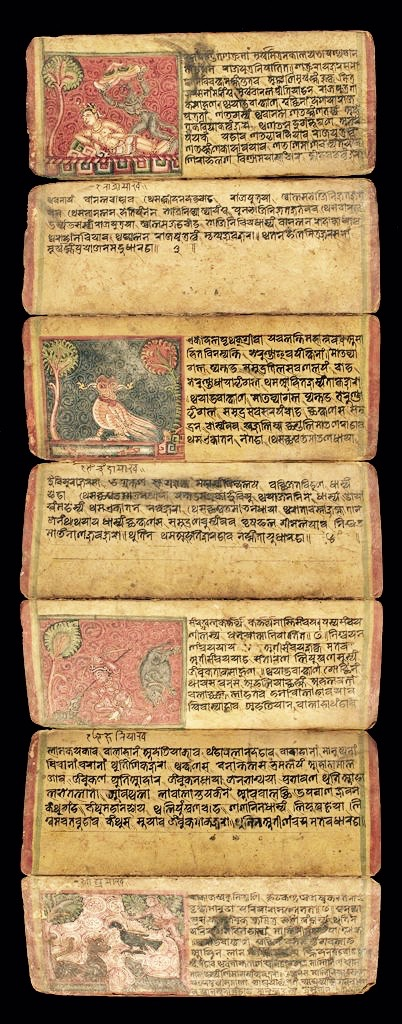
Nepalese manuscript of the Hitopadesha, c.1800

Maxim on learning

Learning to a man is a name superior to beauty;
learning is better than hidden treasure.
Learning is a companion on a journey to a strange country,
learning is strength inexhaustible.
Learning is the source of renown
and the fountain of victory in the senate.
Learning is a superior sight,
learning is a livelihood;
a man without learning is as a beast of the field.

— Hitopadesa
Translator: Charles Wilkins

Hitopadesha (Sanskrit: हितोपदेशः, IAST: Hitopadeśa, "Beneficial Advice") is an Indian text in the Sanskrit language consisting of fables with both human and animal characters. It incorporates maxims, worldly wisdom and advice on political affairs in simple, elegant language, and the work has been widely translated.

Little is known about its origin. The surviving text is believed to be from the 12th century, but it was probably composed by Narayana between 800 and 950 CE. The oldest manuscript found in Nepal has been dated to the 14th century, and its content and style has been traced to the ancient Sanskrit treatises called the Panchatantra from a much earlier time period.

== The author and his sources ==
The authorship of the Hitopadesa has been contested. 19th-century Indologists attributed the text to Vishnu Sharma, a narrator and character that often appears in its fables. Upon the discovery of the oldest known manuscript of the text in Nepal, dated to 1373, and the preparation of a critical edition, scholars generally accept the authority of its two concluding verses. These verses mention Narayana as the author and a king called Dhavala Chandra as the patron of the text. But as no other work by this author is known, and since the ruler mentioned has not been traced in other sources, we know almost nothing of either of them. Dating the work is therefore problematic. There are quotations within it from 8th century works and other internal evidence may point to an East Indian origin during the later Pala Empire (8th-12th century).

Narayana says that the purpose of creating the work is to encourage proficiency in Sanskrit expression (samskrita-uktishu) and knowledge of wise behaviour (niti-vidyam). This is done through the telling of moral stories in which birds, beasts and humans interact. Interest is maintained through the device of enclosed narratives in which a story is interrupted by an illustrative tale before resuming. The style is elaborate and there are frequent pithy verse interludes to illustrate the points made by the various speakers. On account of these, which provide by far the greater part of the text, the work has been described as an anthology of (sometimes contradictory) verses from widespread sources relating to statecraft.

The Hitopadesha is quite similar to the ancient Sanskrit classic, the Panchatantra, another collection of fables with morals. Both have an identical frame story, although the Hitopadesha differs by having only four divisions to the ancient text's five. According to Ludwik Sternbach's critical edition of the text, the Panchatantra is the primary source of some 75% of the Hitopadesha's content, while a third of its verses can be traced to the Panchatantra. In his own introductory verses, Narayana acknowledges that he is indebted to the Panchatantra and 'another work'. The latter is unknown but may possibly be the Dharmasastras or some other.

== Contents ==
Compassion

As your life to you is dear,
So is his to every creature.
The good have compassion for all,
By comparison and analogy with their own nature.

— Hitopadesa Book 1

The Hitopadesha is organized into four books, with a preface section called Prastavika. The opening verse expresses reverence to the Hindu god Ganesha and goddess Saraswati. There are several versions of the text available, though the versions are quite similar unlike other ancient and medieval era Hindu texts wherein the versions vary significantly. The shortest version has 655 verses, while the longest has 749 verses. In the version translated by Wilkins, the first book of Hitopadesha has nine fables, the second and third each have ten, while the fourth has thirteen fables.

=== Book 1 Mitralabha: How to gain a friend ===
The Book 1 is introduced with the statement that wise and sincere friends may be poor or destitute, but it is they who may help one achieve successes in life. The book recommends that the good find good friends, they are like a vessel in which one deposits both joys and sorrows of life, and it is not words that define a friend but their behavior and actions.

Book 1 of Hitopadesha
Fable	Title	Topics
1.1	The pigeons, the crow, the mouse, the tortoise and the deer	
1.2	The traveller and the tiger	
1.3	The deer, the jackal and the crow	
1.4	The blind vulture, the cat and the birds	
1.5	The history of Hiranyaka the mouse	
1.6	The old man and his young wife	
1.7	The huntsman, the deer, the boar, the serpent and the jackal	
1.8	The rajah's son and the merchant's wife	
1.9	The jackal and the elephant	

=== Book 2 Suhrdbheda: How to lose a friend ===
The Book 2 is introduced with the statement that great friendships can be destroyed by the cruel and envious beings who envy such friendship. The book states that misinformation creates wedge between friends, as does a focus on disagreements, rash action without due investigation and a lack of communication.

Book 2 of Hitopadesha
Fable	Title	Topics
2.1	The bull, the two jackals and the lion	
2.2	The ape and the wedge	
2.3	The thief, the ass and the dog	
2.4	The lion, the mouse and the cat	
2.5	The poor woman and the bell	
2.6	The adventures of Kanadarpaketu	
2.7	The farmer's wife and her two gallants	
2.8	The crow, the golden chain and the black serpent	
2.9	The lion and the rabbit	
2.10	The partridges and the sea	

=== Book 3 Vigaraha: War ===
The third book presents a series of fables wherein war is described as a consequence of greed, criticism of others, wicked people and their ideologies, cruel and ungrateful leader, lack of restraint, lack of preparation, poor fortifications, weak military, weak diplomacy, and poor counsel.

Book 3 of Hitopadesha
Fable	Title	Topics
3.1	The geese and the peacocks	
3.2	The birds and the monkeys	
3.3	The ass dressed in a tiger's skin	
3.4	The elephants and the rabbits	
3.5	The goose and the crow	
3.6	The Varttaka and the crow	
3.7	The wheelwright and his wife	
3.8	The blue jackal	
3.9	The man who sacrificed his own son	
3.10	The barber who killed a beggar	

=== Book 4 Sandhi: Peace ===
The fables in Book 4 state that it is always better to seek peace with seven types of people: the truthful, the virtuous, the just, the strong, the victorious, those with many brothers, and the self-destructing worthless. Peace can be achieved, states Hitopadesha, if one examines one's own behavior and one's own seeking as much as that of the opponent, pays attention to the counsel of one's good friends, treats the opponent with respect and understanding that is in tune with the opponent's character, forms one or more of sixteen types of treaties, reciprocal assistance and cooperative ventures between the two sides thereby enabling the pursuit of truth.

Book 4 of Hitopadesha
Fable	Title	Topics
4.1	The geese and the peacocks: part 2	
4.2	The tortoise and the two geese	
4.3	The three fishes	
4.4	The merchant and his artful wife	
4.5	The cranes and the 'helpful' enemy	
4.6	The mouse and the hermit	
4.7	The wicked heron and the crab	
4.8	The Brahmin who broke the pots and pans	
4.9	The two giants	
4.10	The Brahmin and his goat	
4.11	The camel, the crow, the tiger and the jackal	
4.12	The old serpent and the frogs	
4.13	The Brahmin and the loyal mongoose	

=== Closing ===
The text ends with the following,

May peace forever yield happiness to all the victorious possessors of the earth,
May just men forever be free from adversity, and the fame of those who do good long flourish,
May prudence, like a glorious sun shine continually on your breasts,
May the earth, with all her vast possessions, long remain for your enjoyment.

— Hitopadesa, Translator: Charles Wilkins

== Translations ==
=== Premodern ===
By the early 20th-century, translations of the Hitopadesha into the following Indian languages were known:

- Eastern states of India: Bangla, Odiya
- Western states: Gujarati
- Central states: Marathi
- Northern states: Hindi, Newari, Urdu
- Southern states: Kannada, Malayalam, Tamil, Telugu

Akbar (1542–1605) commended the work of translating the Hitopadesha to his own minister, Abul Fazl, with the suggestion that the poems which often interrupt the narrative should be abridged. Fazl accordingly put the book into a familiar style and published it with explanations under the title of the Criterion of Wisdom.

The Hitopadesha was also a favourite among the scholars of the British Raj. It was the first Sanskrit book to be printed in the Nagari script, when it was published by William Carey in Serampore in 1803–4, with an introduction by Henry Colebrooke. This was followed by several later editions during the 19th century, including Max Müller's of 1884, which contains an interlinear literal translation.

Much earlier, Sir William Jones encountered the work in 1786 and it was translated into English the following year by Charles Wilkins, who had also made the earliest English translation of the Bhagavad Gita. A later translation by Edwin Arnold, then Principal of Puna College, was published in London in 1861 under the title The Book of Good Counsels.

=== Modern ===
English Translations

- S. Narayana (2006). Hitopadesa. Translated by Haksar, A.N.D. Penguin Books. ISBN 978-0-140-45522-9.

The text has also been widely translated under different titles into Asian languages such as Burmese, Khmer, Thai, Malay, Persian, Sinhala, as well as into Dutch, English, French, German, Greek, Spanish and Russian.

== See also ==
- Panchatantra
- List of Panchatantra Stories
