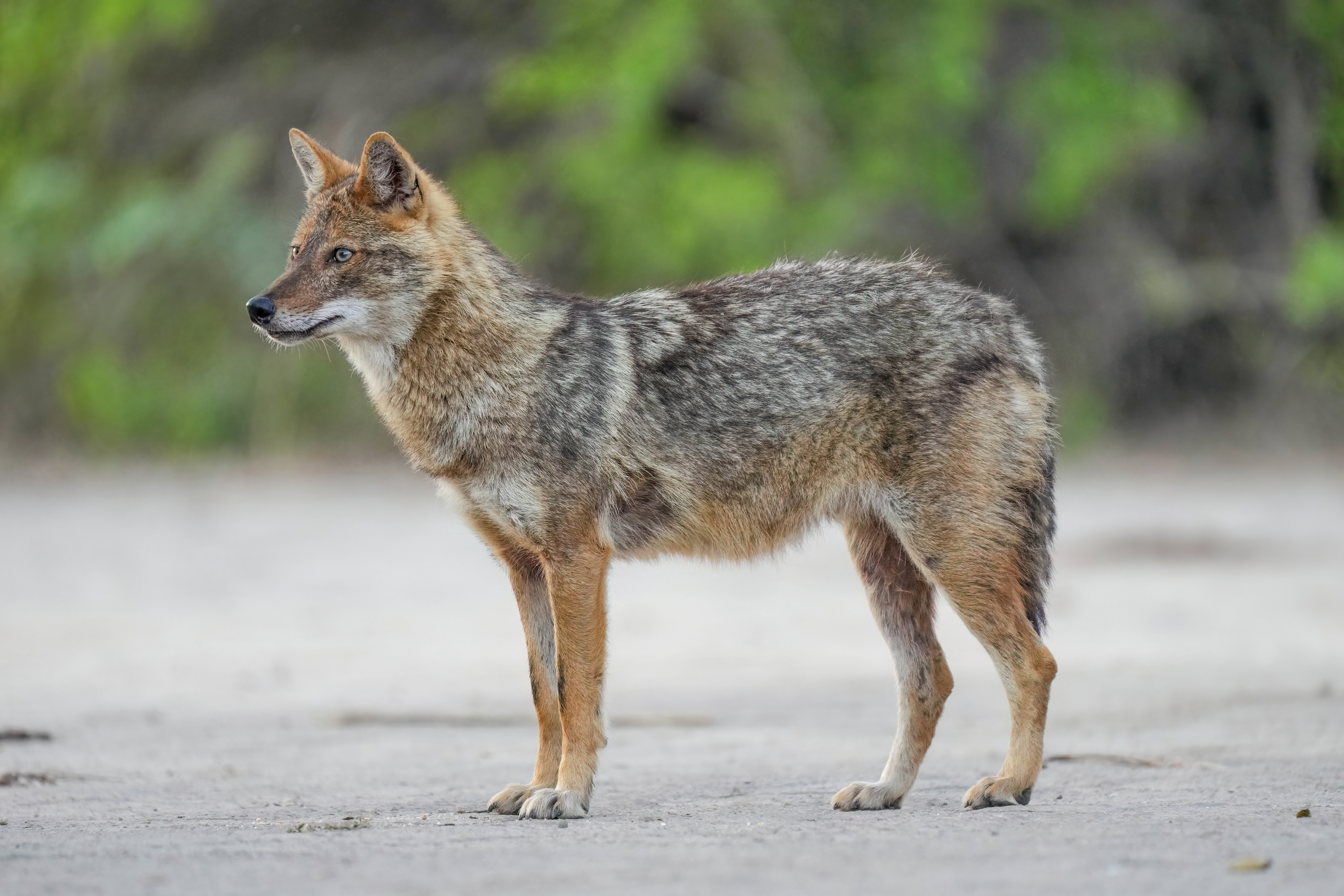
- Calls

Scientific classification
- Kingdom: Animalia
- Phylum: Chordata
- Class: Mammalia
- Order: Carnivora
- Family: Canidae
- Genus: Canis
- Species: C. aureus
- Subspecies: C. a. indicus

Trinomial name
- Canis aureus indicus Hodgson, 1833
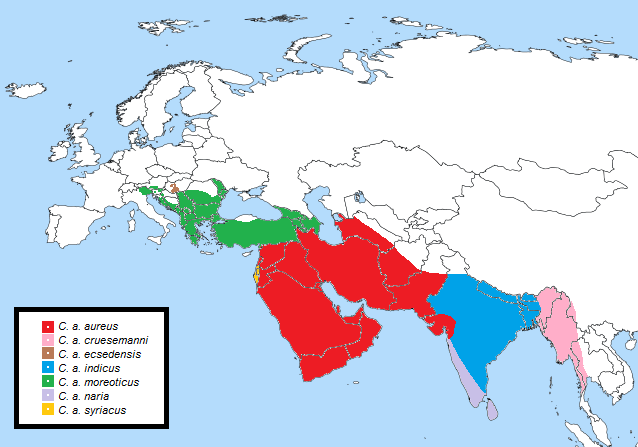
- Canis aureus indicus range (blue)

= Indian jackal =

Subspecies of Golden Jackal

The Indian jackal (Canis aureus indicus), also known as the Himalayan jackal, is a subspecies of golden jackal native to Bhutan, Burma, India, Bangladesh, Nepal, and Pakistan. Its karyotype is quite different (2N=78; NF=84) from that of its Eurasian and African counterparts (2N=80).

== Description ==
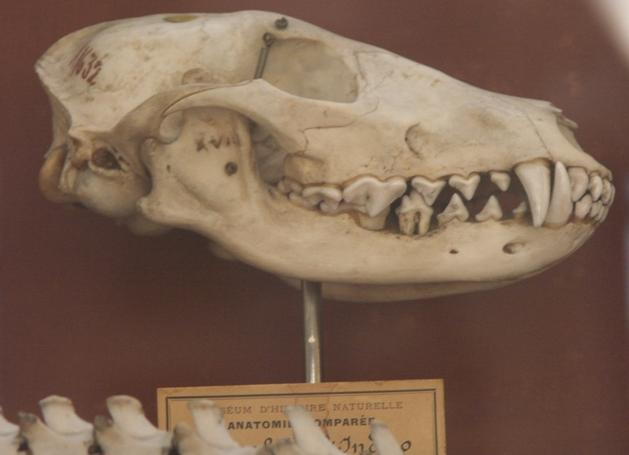
Skull of an Indian jackal from the Muséum national d'histoire naturelle

Its fur is a mixture of black and white, with buff on the shoulders, ears and legs. The buff colour is more pronounced in specimens from high altitudes. Black hairs predominate on the middle of the back and tail. The belly, chest and the sides of the legs are creamy white, while the face and lower flanks are grizzled with grey fur. It is generally of a richer colour than the common jackal, the pale areas of the back being of a pale buff colour rather than whitish or silver. Black specimens have been reported in Bengal. Adults are slightly larger than common jackals, and grow to a length of 100 cm (39 in), 35–45 cm (14–18 in) in height and 8–11 kg (18–24 lb) in weight.

It typically inhabits lowlands on the outskirts of towns, villages and farms, where they shelter in holes among ruins or dense brush. Except during hot periods, the Indian jackal usually only leaves its den at dusk and retires at dawn. Though primarily a scavenger which subsists on garbage and offal, it will supplement its diet with rodents, reptiles, fruit and insects. It will form small packs when hunting small deer and antelopes. Although it will occasionally kill poultry and young kids and lambs, it is largely harmless. When wild prey is scarce, it will usually take to eating vegetable matter, including maize and Jujube fruit. It is extremely harmful to the vineyards of western India, and eats large quantities of coffee beans in the Wayanad district.

A pair of golden Jackal in Jim Corbett National Park, India

Lone jackals expelled from their pack have been known to form commensal relationships with tigers. These solitary jackals are known as kol-bahl, bhálú in southern India, phéall, phao, pheeow or phnew in Bengal and ghog in other regions. They will attach themselves to a particular tiger, trailing it at a safe distance in order to feed on the big cat's kills. A kol-bahl will even alert a tiger to a kill with a loud pheal. Tigers have been known to tolerate these jackals: one report describes how a jackal confidently walked in and out between three tigers walking together a few feet away from each other.

== Presence in folklore and literature ==
Golden jackals appear prominently in Indian , Bangladeshi and Nepali folklore, where they often take over the role of the trickster taken by the red fox in Europe and North America. The story of The Blue Jackal for example has the jackal disguising itself with blue paint as Neelaakanth, the guardian of all animals, and tricking the other animals into providing food for him, so that he may continue protecting them. He is driven away once the monsoon washes the paint from him. In some tales, jackals are portrayed as malevolent and treacherous. The Mahabharata describes the story of a jackal who sets his friends, the tiger, wolf, mongoose and mouse against each other, just so he can eat a gazelle without sharing it. Jackals are the vahanas of various Hindu and Buddhist deities, particularly in Tibet. Durga was often linked to the jackal.

In Rudyard Kipling's Mowgli stories collected in The Jungle Book, the character Tabaqui is a jackal despised by the Sioni wolf pack, due to his mock cordiality, scavenging habits and his subservience to Shere Khan. He appears in the beginning of the book, visiting Mowgli's adoptive parents, Mother and Father Wolf, and they are clearly annoyed by his presence, since he announces that Shere Khan the tiger is hunting in their territory. Tabaqui is later killed by one of Mowgli's 'siblings', Grey Brother, who crushes his back.
