= The Blue Jackal =

Story known throughout the Indian sub-continent

The Blue Jackal is a folktale known across the Indian sub-continent.

== Earliest reference ==
The earliest reference to the Blue Jackal can be found in Panchatantra, a collection of stories which depict animals in human situations (see anthropomorphism, Talking animals in fiction). In each of the stories, every animal has a "personality", with every narrative culminating in a central moral lesson.

== The story ==
The story of the Blue Jackal known through oral transmission doesn't vary much from one part of India to another. Although the creature is known variously as Chandru, Neelaakanth or Neela Gidhar (literally, Blue Jackal).

The most common version is told like this:

The Story of the Blue Jackal is one story in the Panchatantra
One evening when it was dark, a hungry jackal went in search of food in a large village close to his home in the jungle. The local dogs didn't like Jackals and chased him away so that they could make their owners proud by killing a beastly jackal. The jackal ran as fast as he could, and not looking where he was going fell into a bucket of indigo dye outside the home of the cloth dyer. The dogs ran further and the jackal climbed out of the bucket, wet but unharmed.

The jackal continued into the jungle and saw the lion, King of the Jungle. The Lion asked him who he was and the jackal seeing that he had now turned blue declared himself as Chandru - protector of all the animals in the jungle. Chandru told the lion that he would only continue to protect the jungle if all the animals would give him food and shelter.

Soon Chandru was sought for advice from animals from other jungles and animals sat at his feet and brought him the best of food. But one full moon night, some jackals were howling. Chandru had not heard or seen them, so he howled back too. The animals realised that he was an ordinary jackal and chased him far into the jungle, where he was never seen again.

== See also ==
- Fables
- Indian literature
- Panchatantra
