= Narayan Pandit =

Indian writer

Narayan Pandit (Hindi: नारायण पण्डित), or Narayana (died 10th century), was the Brāhmaṇa author of the Sanskrit treatise called Hitopadesha — a work based primarily on the Panchatantra, one of the oldest collection of stories, mainly animal fables, in the world. Narayana's dates are not known, but scholarly consensus places the composition of the Hitopadesha at around 800 to 950 CE. The last lines of the book indicate the name of the author as Narayan Pandit:

नारायणेन प्रचरतु रचितः संग्रहोऽयं कथानाम्

Narayan Pandit was the royal poet of Dhawalchandra, the king of Bengal. The beginning and ending shlokas of the book indicate the deep faith of Narayan Pandit in lord Shiva.

== See also ==
- Vishnu Sharma
- Indian writers
